= Car-free =

Car-free can refer to several things:

- Car-free city - a population center that relies primarily on public transport, walking, or cycling for transport within the urban area.
- Car-free days
- Car Free Day Vancouver
- Car-free movement
- Car free walking
- List of car-free islands
- Pedestrian zones
- World Carfree Network
- Car ban

== See also ==
- Carree (name)
