= Mohammad Darvish =

Iranian environmentalist (born 1966)

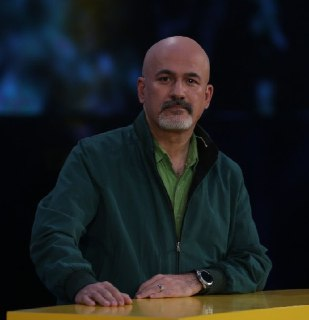
- Mohammad Darvish, Environmentalist
- Born: January 24, 1966 (age 60); Tehran, Iran
- Occupation: Environmental activist
- Years active: 1980s-Present
- Known for: Desert Research
- Website: https://mohammaddarvish.com/desert/

Mohammad Darvish (Persian: محمد درویش; born January 24, 1966, in Tehran) is an Iranian environmentalist and desert researcher. He is currently the head on Environment committee in Iran branch of UNESCO. He has worked for three decades as a Desert Researcher and explorer of desertification components at the Research Institute of Iran's Forest and Range lands.

He has been created effective campaigns for rescuing foresters from execution, buying fire extinguishing equipment, forming a people's unit for the conservation of Sardasht forests in Zagros, raising funds to cover treatment costs for the families of environmental activists, etc. even under the most difficult economic conditions of the country.

He also made an extensive effort to bestow an organizational structure on environmental NGOs to form them into state and national networks. As a result, in the sixth five-year development plan, during the time that the chapter on the environment was being drafted, for the first time NGOs had the chance to participate actively and had the right to vote.

He has also helped promote bike-riding and the campaign called car-free Tuesdays in 180 towns and cities in Iran, founded the Child and Nature Foundation to help children below the age of 12 understand their country's nature better, educated others in waste management and source separation, and conducted a monumental internet petition entitled rescuing Mesopotamia from Excessive Damming in the Region of Turkey and Mesopotamia.

Mohammad Darvish, on the 28th of December 2023, in the TEDxSUT lecture of Sharif University, while explaining the latest situation of the country's environmental challenges and crises, tried to explain the ways out by referring to several successful experiences.

== Responsibilities ==
Director General of organization for public participation in Iran's protection of the environment till October 2017. Director General of the Education division of Iran's protection of the environment till February 2015. Head of the strategic division of the presidential section of the environment till August 2017

Member of the committee to review and create the laws and the rules regarding the living Environment under the direction of environmental protection Agency.

Head on Environment committee in Iran branch of UNESCO. Responsible for creation of major research project in the 20-year perspective at the Desert Research Center.

Membership in the group of individuals creating Nature Schools at the Environmental Protection Agency. Member of the Supreme National Security Council and supervisor of the Environmental Book of the Year Celebration. Member of the Council for Clean Transport at the Ministry of Interior till now. (Note: Last Update August 2020)

== Scholarships and recognition ==
Outstanding Research Scholar of the Nation in 1999 in planning the implementation of the Deserts projects. Outstanding author of guide for the 20 year development of the ministry of Agriculture in the deserts division 2005. Author of the Combating Desertification Weblog, the world third best environmental weblog in 2009. Outstanding Personality of the Living environment by the Iranian Evaluation committee 2012. Recognition by the Environmental Protection Agency for the creation of the Foundation for protecting the environment 2012. World's best environmental weblog selected by World Media Summit at Bonn/Germany 2013. Ambassador for promotion of Biking by the ministry of sports for the young 2018.
