= Endesa X =

Spanish energy company

- Company type: Privately-held company
- Industry: Energy
- Founded: 1 September 2020
- Founder: Enel Group
- Headquarters: Madrid, Spain
- Key people: Josep Trabado Farré, General Manager
- Website: www.endesax.com

Endesa X is a renewable energy company that operates in Spain and Portugal to achieve the goal of total decarbonization, a European Union target to be met by 2050. Its main office is in Madrid.

== History ==
On 18 November 2018, the Endesa Group launched Endesa X as an own brand with a focus on digitization, innovation and sustainability in both Spain and Portugal. Endesa X aims to promote access to renewable energy sources for companies, public administrations and private individuals. In 2018, Endesa X announced the development of a public access charging infrastructure plan to promote electric mobility in Spain. This plan includes the installation of 8,500 public access charging points over a five-year period (2019-2023). Endesa X confirmed the objective of 2020 with the installation of the first 2,000 public charging stations, thus completing the first phase of the project. The company has a portfolio of 2 million customers, 298 employees in Spain and 6 in Portugal. In 2019, Endesa's gross investments totalled 271.2 million euros. On 14 September 2020 it has announced a cooperation agreement with Athlon (Daimler Group) to launch an electric leasing service for companies. In the same year, in coordination with HERE, a company providing geographic and cartographic data services, Endesa X has launched City Analytics, a mobility map that helps public administrations in managing emergencies during the COVID-19 pandemic.

== Activities ==
In 2020, the company launched a smart thermostat which integrates Amazon's virtual assistant Alexa.

In Barcelona, it worked together with the City Council on the development of electric buses. This led, in October 2020, to the first fully electric line (H16) which joins the Forum with the Zona Franca area.

== Awards ==
On 11 December 2018 Endesa X received “Best Mobility Project” from Spanish radio station Capital Radio for its 5-years infrastructure plan.

On 15 September 2020, Endesa X received the First Prize for the “European Mobility Week” from the Generalitat Valenciana, for its commitment to electric mobility.

== See also ==
- Endesa
