= Car-free days in the Philippines =

Days promoting car-free travel and activities

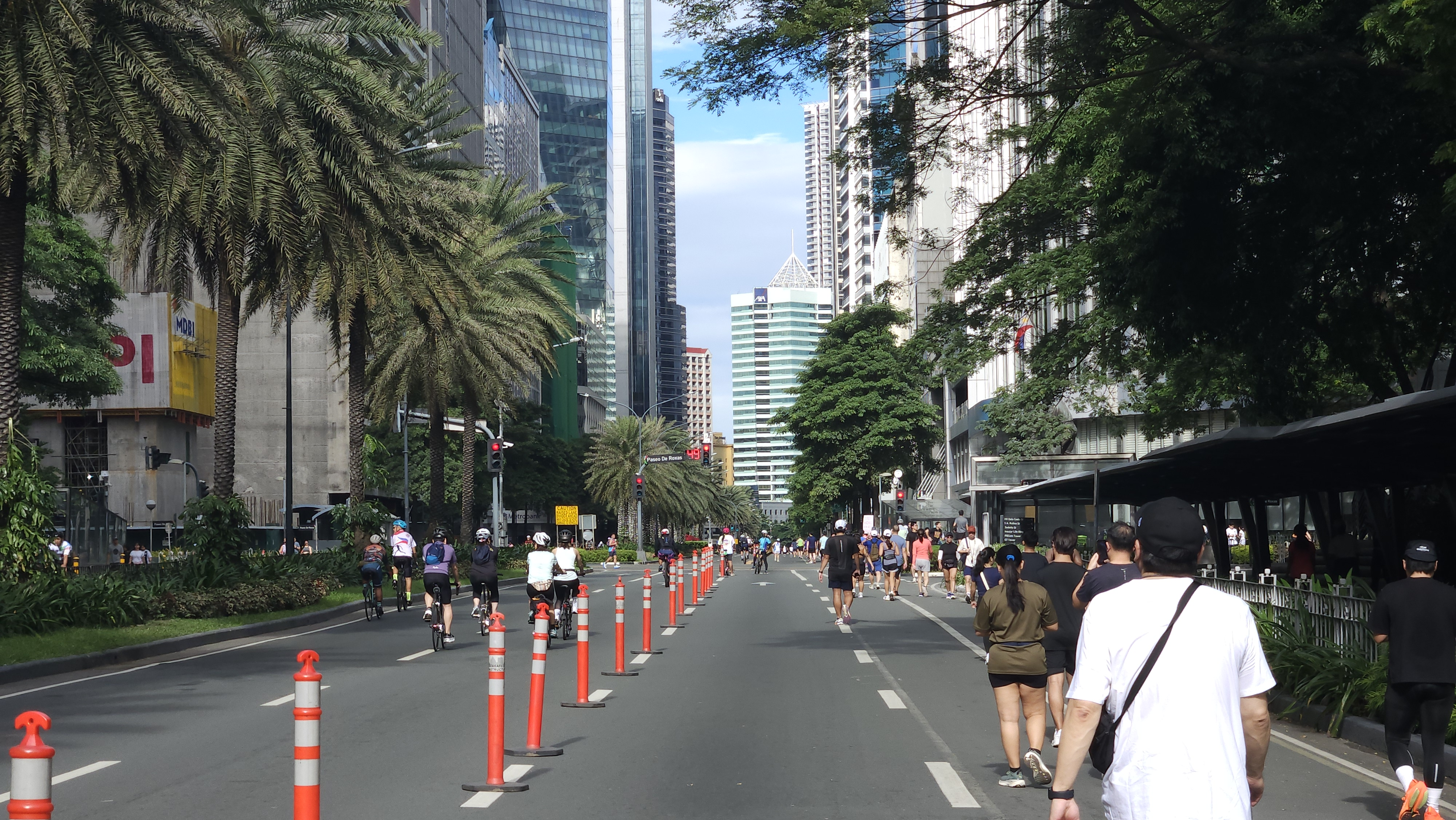
Car-Free Sundays at Ayala Avenue, Makati

Car-free days in the Philippines refers to several government and private sector initiatives designating certain areas at specific days or times as car-free to promote gatherings, exercise, and other recreational activities.

== History ==
The earliest known example of a car-free area in the country was the pedestrianization of Rizal Avenue from Recto Avenue to Carriedo Street in Santa Mesa in 2003 and the 217-meter (712 ft) Teresa Street in Santa Mesa in Manila. Both initiatives however, were reversed due to change in administration and traffic complaints, with the Rizal Avenue segment reopening to vehicular traffic in 2007.

On June 3, 2012, the Pasig city government launched a car-free day along F. Ortigas Jr. Road in Ortigas Center, closing the road to motor vehicle traffic on Sunday mornings. The car-free day was suspended during the COVID-19 lockdowns from 2020 to 2021, where it was revived in November 2021 as Open Street Sundays. Since 2021, Pasig has since designated more roads with car-free days, dubbing the program as People's Streets.

In 2013, Filinvest City in Muntinlupa launched its Carless Sundays by closing one lane along Commerce Avenue, Corporate Avenue, Parkway Street, and Filinvest Avenue to traffic on Sunday mornings. This was later on expanded to include Asean Drive, Spectrum Midway, and Promenade Street with a total route of 4.5 km (2.8 mi).

In February 2021, the entire 5th Avenue in Bonifacio Global City in Taguig was made car-free every weekend.

In September 2023, Ayala Land, the Makati Commercial Estates Association (MaCEA), and the Makati government launched Car Free Sundays at Ayala Avenue, closing most of Ayala Avenue as well as parts of Makati Avenue and Paseo de Roxas around the Ayala Triangle Gardens on Sunday mornings.

In December 2023, car-free days were also initiated by the Greenfield Development Corporation in Greenfield District, with parts of Mayflower Street being closed to traffic on Sunday mornings.

In June 2024, Ayala Land launched Car Free Sundays in both the Cebu Business Park and Cebu IT Park in Cebu City. Initially planned to run only for the month of June, the initiative was extended in July and remains in effect until further notice. The Bacolod city government also launched its own Car-Free Sundays that month, closing a 1.2 km (0.75 mi) section of Lacson Street for leisure activities.

In November 2024, Villar City launched its own Car-Free Sundays, which closes a 3 km (1.9 mi) segment of Villar Avenue from Daang Hari to Amore Avenue (Vista Avenue) for walking, running, and cycling on Sunday mornings. A 2.2 to 2.4 km (1.4 to 1.5 mi) mountain biking trail adjacent to the closed segment was also launched in February 2025. Later that month, the Davao City Council passed an ordinance making the entire Davao City Coastal Road in Davao City as car-free on Sunday mornings. Cycling activities are allowed along the road's northbound lanes, while running, walking, and jogging are allowed along the road's the southbound lanes. Other leisure and fitness activities were then designated at the two parks along the Coastal Road.

In December 2024, following public consultations conducted by Rappler and the Quezon City government in September 2024, the Quezon City Council passed City Ordinance No. SP-3345 S-2024. The ordinance creates a Car-Free, Carefree Sundays initiative along Tomas Morato Avenue and closes the segment from Scout Rallos Street to Don A. Roces Avenue on the first Sunday of each month for activities such as Zumba, jogging, cycling, exercise, and social gatherings. In January 2025, the initiative was expanded to take place on every other Sunday.

In March 2025, Marikina launched its Car-Free Sundays by closing a portion of Gil Fernando Avenue from Bayan-Bayanan Access Road to Guerilla Street and inaugurating a public mural that showcases notable landmarks and personalities, as well as the history and culture of Marikina.

In August 2025, the Butuan City Council passed SP Ordinance No. 17-019-2025, which closes off sections of major roads in Butuan as car-free on Sunday from morning to evening. Dubbed "Ato Ra Kung Domingo" lit. 'The Sunday is ours', the initiative aims to promote the reclamation of streets as safe and inclusive dynamic public spaces for recreation and community bonding.

In November 2025, Naga launched its nighttime Carless Sundays along Magsaysay Avenue with fitness activities, street art, and chalk zones. Following the success of its first Carless Sunday, the city government announced that succeeding Sundays will have different events, performances, and activities beyond the car-free section of Magsaysay Avenue.

== List ==
=== Metro Manila ===
List of car-free days in Metro Manila
Name	Year started	Organizer	Schedule	Coverage	Length	Location
Car Free Sundays at Ayala Avenue	2023	Makati Commercial Estates Association and Ayala Land	Every Sunday, 6:00 am to 10:00 am	Ayala Avenue (Salcedo and H.V. Dela Costa to West Street and Fonda); Makati Avenue (Ayala Avenue to Paseo de Roxas); Paseo de Roxas (Ayala Avenue to Makati Avenue)	2.3 km (1.4 mi)	Makati Central Business District, Makati
Car-Free Sundays at Mayflower Street	2023	Greenfield Development Corporation	Every Sunday, 6:00 am to 10:00 am	Mayflower Street (Shaw Boulevard to United Street)	0.16 km (0.099 mi)	Greenfield District, Mandaluyong
Car-Free, Care-Free Days	2024	Quezon City Government	Every other Sunday of the month, 5:00 am to 10:00 am	Tomas Morato Avenue (Timog Avenue to Don Alejandro Roces Avenue)	0.8 km (0.50 mi)	Diliman, Quezon City
Filinvest City Carless Sundays	2013	Filinvest Development Corporation	Every Sunday, 5:00 am to 9:00 am	Filinvest Avenue (Parkway Street to Commerce Avenue); Parkway Street (Filinvest Avenue to Corporate Avenue); Corporate Avenue (Parkway Street to Commerce Avenue); Commerce Avenue (Corporate Avenue to Filinvest Avenue); Spectrum Midway (Parkway Street to Commerce Avenue); Asean Drive (Begawan Lane to Bangkok Lane and Saigon Lane); Promenade (Corporate Avenue to Filinvest Avenue)	4.5 km (2.8 mi)	Filinvest City, Muntinlupa
Marikina Together: Car-Free Sundays	2025	Marikina City Government	Every Sunday, 6:00 am to 10:00 am	Gil Fernando Avenue (Gill Fernando Avenue Extension to Guerilla Street)	0.7 km (0.43 mi)	Santo Niño, Marikina
My Street High Street	2021	Fort Bonifacio Development Corporation	Every Saturday and Sunday, 11:00 am to 9:00 pm	5th Avenue (28th Street to 30th Street)	0.2 km (0.12 mi)	Bonifacio Global City, Taguig

List of People's Streets in Pasig
Name	Year started	Organizer	Schedule	Coverage	Length	Location
Brgy. San Antonio People's Street	2012	Pasig City Government	Every Saturday, 6:00 am to Sunday 9:00 pm	F. Ortigas Jr. Road (Emerald Avenue) (Garnet Road to Julia Vargas Avenue)	0.5 km (0.31 mi)	Ortigas Center, Pasig
People's Street sa Brgy. Bagong Ilog	2022	Pasig City Government	Every Sunday, 6:00 am to 12:00 pm	Felipe Pike Street (Kamagong Street) (Eugenio Mejia to Yakal Street)	0.35 km (0.22 mi)	Bagong Ilog, Pasig
People's Street sa Brgy. Kapasigan	2023	Pasig City Government	Every Sunday, 6:00 am to 6:00 pm	Industria Extension (Kapasigan Boulevard)		Kapasigan, Pasig
People's Street sa Brgy. Manggahan	2022	Pasig City Government	Every Sunday, 6:00 am to 6:00 pm	East Bank Road (Manggahan Barangay Hall to Alfonso Street))	0.75 km (0.47 mi)	Manggahan, Pasig
People's Street sa Brgy. Oranbo	2022	Pasig City Government	Every Sunday 6:00 am to 6:00 pm	Oranbo Drive (Capt. Javier Drive to St. Peter Street)		Oranbo, Pasig
People's Street sa Brgy. San Nicolas	2022	Pasig City Government	Every Saturday, 6:00 am to Sunday 9:00 pm	Caruncho Avenue (SPED Linear Park to M.H. del Pilar Street)		San Nicolas (Pob.), Pasig
People's Street sa Brgy. Sto. Tomas	2022	Pasig City Government	Every Sunday, 6:00 am to 12:00 pm	M.H. del Pilar Street (San Nicolas Barangay Hall to Elpidio Angeles Street)		Sto. Tomas, Pasig
People's Street sa Brgy. Sumilang	2022	Pasig City Government	Every Sunday, 6:00 am to 6:00 pm	Lopez Jaena Street (E. Santos Avenue to Dr. Garcia Street)		Sumilang, Pasig

List of former car-free days in Metro Manila
Name	Year started	Year ended	Organizer	Schedule	Coverage	Length	Location
Move Manila Car-Free Sundays By the Bay	2024	2025	Manila City Government	Every Sunday, 6:00 am to 10:00 am	Roxas Boulevard (Padre Burgos Avenue to Quirino Avenue)	2.3 km (1.4 mi)	Ermita and Malate, Manila
Weekend Shared Street in Salcedo	2026	2026	Makati Commercial Estates Association and Ayala Land	Every Saturday and Sunday in August 2026, all day	Paseo de Roxas (Sedeño Street to Villar Street); Sedeño Street (partial closure); Villar Street (partial closure); Leviste Street (partial closure)		Makati Central Business District, Makati

=== Luzon ===
List of car-free days in Luzon
Name	Year started	Organizer	Schedule	Coverage	Location
Session Road Pedestrianization	2019	Baguio City Government	Every Sunday	Session Road	Baguio, Benguet
Villar City Car-Free Sundays	2024	Villar Land	Every Sunday, 5:00 am to 10:00 am	Villar Avenue (Daang Hari to Vista Avenue)	Villar City, Bacoor, Cavite
Car Free Sundays at Vermosa (formerly Vermosa Open Streets)	2025	Ayala Land	Every Sunday, schedule varies	Vermosa Boulevard; Champions Loop; Olympic Drive	Ayala Vermosa Sports Hub, Imus, Cavite

=== Visayas ===
List of car-free days in Visayas
Name	Year started	Organizer	Schedule	Coverage	Location
Car-Free Sundays Bacolod	2024	Bacolod City Government	Every Sunday, 5:00 am to 9:00 am	Lacson Street (Ramos North Drive to South Capitol Road)	Bacolod, Negros Occidental
Car Free Sundays at Cebu Business Park	2024	Ayala Land	Every Sunday, 5:00 am to 10:00 am	Mindanao Avenue WB (Archbishop Reyes Avenue to Siquijor Road); Mindanao Avenue EB (Siquijor Road to Biliran Road)	Cebu Business Park, Cebu City
Car Free Sundays at Cebu I.T. Park	2024	Ayala Land	Every Sunday, 5:00 am to 10:00 am	Geonzon Street (Abad Street to I. Villa Street); I. Villa Street (Geonzon Street to Jose Maria Del Mar Street); Jose Maria Del Mar Street (I. Villa Street to Abad Street); Abad Street (Jose Maria Del Mar Street to Geonzon Street)	Cebu IT Park, Cebu City
Magsaysay Carless Sundays	2025	Naga City Government	Every Sunday, 5:00 pm to 11:00 pm	Magsaysay Avenue (Balatas Road to Leon SA Aureus Street)	Naga, Camarines Sur
Car-Free Sundays at North Point	2026	Ayala Land	Every Sunday, 5:00 am to 10:00 am	Estate Spine Road	North Point, Talisay, Negros Occidental

=== Mindanao ===
List of car-free days in Mindanao
Name	Year started	Organizer	Schedule	Coverage	Location
Car-Free Sundays at Davao City Coastal Road	2024	Davao City Government	Every Sunday, 4:00 am to 8:00 am	Davao City Coastal Road (Bago Entrance to Tulip Drive)	Davao City
Ato Ra Kung Domingo	2025	Butuan City Government	Every Sunday: 5:00 am to 7:00 am – J.C. Aquino Avenue (Bancasi Rotonda to Robinsons Place Butuan); 5:00 am to 10:00 am – J.C. Aquino Avenue (Robinsons Place Butuan to SM City Butuan); 4:00 am to 9:00 am and 4:00 pm to 9:00 pm – City Hall Rotunda	Jose Rosales Avenue (City Hall Rotunda); J.C. Aquino Avenue (eastbound lanes from Bancasi Rotonda to SM City Butuan)	Butuan, Agusan del Norte

== See also ==
- Car-free movement
- List of pedestrian zones
