= Environmental Transport Association =

Carbon neutral insurer and breakdown cover

The Environmental Transport Association (ETA) is a British carbon-neutral provider of vehicle breakdown, bicycle, and travel insurance for the environmentally concerned consumer. The ETA aims to raise awareness of the impact that transport has on the environment and help individuals and organizations make positive changes in their travel habits. They offer breakdown and road rescue services for cyclists, mobility scooter users, and motorists.

In 2015, the ETA was voted Britain's most ethical insurance company by the Good Shopping Guide.

== Promotional vehicles ==
The ETA has built a number of unusual vehicles over recent years to promote sustainable transport as well as its own insurance products, two of which have gained Guinness World Records. The Guinness World Record for QTvan is a tiny caravan designed to be towed behind a bicycle or mobility scooter and is officially recognized as the world's smallest caravan. The Hornster was designed and built as a way of highlighting the danger posed to cyclists by lorries in urban areas. The bike is fitted with the air horn from a freight train, which is powered by a SCUBA diving cylinder and has been judged by Guinness World Records to be the world's loudest bicycle horn. The BOND bike was built by the ETA in response to the frustrations faced by urban cyclists; it features a handlebar-mounted flamethrower to dissuade motorists from overtaking too close, a caterpillar track to negotiate potholes, and an ejector seat to deal with bike thieves.

== History ==
The ETA was founded in 1990 and became carbon neutral in 2002. It conducts and commissions research into environmental transport issues. It actively lobbies the government and key decision-makers to discuss new thinking in environmental transport. They claim to be the world's first climate-neutral motoring organization. The ETA was a founding member of Transport and the Environment promoting sustainable transport in Europe; which means an approach to transport that is environmentally responsible, economically sound, and socially just.

1992 - Green Transport Week is launched in Weybridge.

1993 - The ETA publishes Britain's first Car Buyers' Guide for people wanting to buy greener vehicles.

1995 - Sets up Walk to School Day in Hertfordshire as part of Green Transport Week. 1995: Sets up a charitable trust.

1997 - The ETA inaugurated the world's first national Car Free Day as part of Green Transport Week, which is now held on 22 September every year. In 2014 Car Free Days were held in Beijing, Moscow, and Washington.

1998 - Founder member of the Slower Speeds Initiative.

1997 - Began the "20's Plenty" campaign for urban streets and rural lanes. Via the 20's Plenty for Us organisation - partially funded by the ETA, an estimated 13 million people will be living on streets at 20 mph within the year.

2002 - The ETA Trust, a charity, became limited by guarantee.

2008 - ETA Services Ltd., the services arm, and ETA Trust, the campaigning arm, separate. ETA Services funds the ETA Trust through a proportion of its revenue.

2012 - Began the pop-up zebra crossing campaign

2014 - Established the "Back on a Bike" campaign

2015 - Voted Britain's most ethical insurance company by the Good Shopping Guide
