= Car free walking =

Campaign for travelling to hiking trails by public transport

Car-free walking is a movement in the United Kingdom that aims to encourage people who take recreational walks to use public transport instead of a car to get to their starting point. This movement did not stop in UK, similar movements have been conducted in places such as New York City with other motivations in addition to the main goal like personal health and fitness.

== Principles ==
Car-free walking was created to encourage walkers to use public transport rather than using cars to reach the start of a walk. This is to reduce the number of cars in the countryside, particularly in National Parks, which can cause congestion and inappropriate parking. It is also to support bus and train services in rural areas. Encouraging people not to use their cars is also one of the key aspects of efforts to combat climate change caused through greenhouse gas emissions.

== Benefits ==
Car-free walking has environmental benefits, because it encourages people not to use a car and provides information on how to do this. It also supports public transport in rural areas. The benefits for the walker include the opportunity to walk linear routes that start and finish in different places and the chance to have a drink at the end of the walk without then having to drive. Many of the walking routes suggest a pub at the end of the walk.

== Supporters ==
Many organisations encourage their members to use public transport when walking. Prominent supporters of this approach include the Youth Hostel Association through its Empty Roads website and the Ramblers Association

== Websites ==
Car Free Walks is an internet-based project to collect car-free walking routes from around the UK. People can find car-free walks throughout the UK or add their own walks. Car Free Walks is part of the growing car-free movement around the world. It has won a number of environmentally themed awards. The website was created in September 2007 by a group of keen walkers based in Brighton, UK, and features walks in England, Scotland and Wales as well as a news and blog section. Walks on the site can be accessed free of charge, including GPX-downloads (which requires registration) and printer-friendly versions of each walk. The website provides up-to-date information about public transport to and from the walk through links to the Transport Direct website. Site visitors can submit their own walks via a walk editor and participate in a quarterly prize draw.

There are many local websites describing walks in a particular region or from a particular railway line, including:

- East Suffolk Line Walks
- Rail Rambles (Wales)
- Car free walks from Richmond (Yorkshire)
- Car free Walks in the Thames Valley and Chilterns

== Books ==
There are several books of car-free walking routes.

- Jon Sparks; John Gillham; Ronald Turnbull. Car Free Cumbria: Walking the County Using Lake Steamers, Local Buses and Trains. A John Gilham green guide.
- Christopher Somerville. Walks in the Country Near London. Globetrotter Walking Guides.
- Robert Swain. 55 555 walks. Yan Press. - routes accessible by the 555 bus route from Lancaster to Kendal

== See also ==
- 15-minute city
- Carfree city
- Greenway (landscape)
- Pedestrian zone
- Walkability
- Walking audit
