= Slower Speeds Initiative =

UK pressure group

The Slower Speeds Initiative is a UK single issue coalition pressure group. It is an unincorporated association, controlled by its management committee, made up of representatives of its founder organisations. Its aims are "to raise awareness of the consequences of inappropriate speeds of road vehicles, to stimulate and contribute to the discussion on vehicle speeds and means of reducing inappropriate speeds and to achieve changes in government policy, driver behaviour and other relevant areas to reduce speeds".

The group advocates:

- lower and better enforced speed limits, including on high quality roads, where "by discouraging longer journeys they would help to restrain traffic growth and improve the competitiveness of public transport for longer journeys".
- more resources for speed reduction
- what they see as more responsible attitudes to speed
- changes in the law to reflect the seriousness of speeding offences
- the introduction of variable speed limiters

== History ==
In 1998 the Slower Speeds Initiative was founded by the following organisations:

- Campaign for Better Transport (formally 'Transport 2000')
- Children's Play Council
- Cyclists' Touring Club (CTC)
- Environmental Transport Association (ETA)
- Living Streets (formally Pedestrian Association)
- RoadPeace
- Sustrans

Of the organisations above, Sustrans, Living Streets, the ETA and the Cyclists' Touring Club are affiliates of the CBT itself as well as supporting the Initiative.
