= World Carfree Network =

International social movement organization

The World Carfree Network (WCN) is an international network that coordinates the actions of car-free advocates from around the world. It is the main hub of the global car-free movement. The World Carfree Network brings together roughly 90-member organisations and many more individuals dedicated to promoting alternatives to car dependence and automobile-based planning at the international level. Working to reduce the human impact on the natural environment while improving the quality of life for all are major goals.

== History ==
The network grew out of the activities of Car Busters, an international organisation within the carfree movement founded in 1997. The name Car Busters continued to be used in its joined spelling for Carbusters Magazine. Carbusters Magazine celebrated ten years of existence in 2008.

The Towards Carfree Cities conference series is one of the principal activities every year in the network. The conference has been held so far eight times and on three different continents:

- Towards Carfree Cities I: October 26-November 1, 1997 - Lyon, France
- Towards Carfree Cities II: April 10–15, 2000 - Timișoara, Romania
- Towards Carfree Cities III: March 17–22, 2003 - Prague, Czech Republic
- Towards Carfree Cities IV: July 19–24, 2004 - Berlin, Germany
- Towards Carfree Cities V: July 18–22, 2005 - Budapest, Hungary
- Towards Carfree Cities VI: September 20–24, 2006 - Bogotá, Colombia
- Towards Carfree Cities VII: August 27–31, 2007 - Istanbul, Turkey
- Towards Carfree Cities VIII: June 16–20, 2008, Portland, Oregon, US
- Towards Carfree Cities IX: 28 June-1 July 2010, York, England
- Towards Carfree Cities X: 5–9 September 2011, Guadalajara, Mexico

World Car-Free Day is organized on 22 September.

== Activities ==
The network runs many projects and activities. Some of these are run by the network's International Coordination Centre (ICC). Others are coordinated in a decentralised manner by network members. Others still, such as the Towards Carfree Cities conference series, function by consensus between a project coordinator at the ICC and one or more local partners.

- World Carfree News monthly e-bulletin
- Carbusters Magazine
- Car-Free Days coordination and resources
- Towards Carfree Cities conference series
- World Carfree Network Resource Centre
- Carfree Green Pages online directory
- International Youth Exchanges (on irregular basis)
- Ecotopia Biketour coordination assistance
- Visegrad Publications Project (Central Europe)
- Autoholics Anonymous (UK)
- Carfree Network discussion list

Its International Coordination Centre is located in Prague, Czech Republic.

== See also ==
- List of car-free places
- Car-free movement
- Carfree city
