= No Car Day =

Chinese environmental campaign

In 2007, China launched the Green Transport and Health week campaign to help residents understand the importance of environmental protection and be mindful about saving energy. The campaign ended with a No Car Day Saturday.

This Chinese national urban transport campaign was implemented by the Ministry of Construction. During the week of September 22, walking, biking, public transportation, and carpooling are encouraged. On No Car Day they will have special 'green zones' in hundreds of cities. These normally vehicle congested areas will be open only to pedestrians, bicycles, and buses from 7am to 7pm.

No Car Day's main objective is to promote public transportation. Public transportation helps to conserve energy and have lower emission because the number of vehicles has been reduced. No Car Day was originally started in preparation for the 2008 Summer Olympic Games that were being held in Beijing.

It is estimated that the 2007 campaign saved 33 million liters of gasoline and cut emissions by 3,000 tons.

== Issues ==
Although over 100 cities were participating in No Car Day, it wasn't making an impact everywhere. Beijing, the capital of China, had cars on the road as if it was a normal day. There were even some roads that weren't going along with no car day. During the span of no car day citizens were encouraged to walk, take public transit or ride a bike.

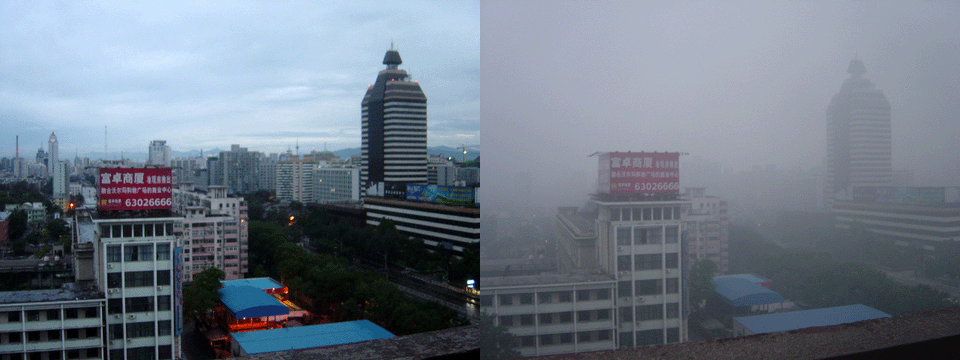
Side by side pictures of Beijing, China. One with smog and the other without.

Driving automobiles in China has become a status symbol for many residents. Bikers were being judged and being victims of prejudice just because they chose to ride a bike instead of a car. The people of China were not interested in undoing all that they've accomplished in it being more acceptable to drive cars. Before the 1980s, having a car for personal use was illegal and bikes packed city streets.

The picture on the right shows what Beijing, China would look like if No Car Day made more of an impact on individuals. But it also shows the daily occurrence of smog filled air that accompanies China. Smog makes it hard to breathe and is unhealthy for the population.

== Events ==
No Car Day's original focus was to advocate drivers about the environmental impact of driving cars. But it has not always grabbed drivers attentions in China. No Car Day has not necessarily been a recurring thing. They have advocated for the environment but they have not made strides in getting people to use public transportation more often. In 2014 they tried to bring it back and even though it was in effect, roads were still congested. They advocated for drivers to stay clear on the car free zones but they were suggestion and not enforced. In the future China could start charging a tax for driving in traffic congestion. This would make it more expensive to drive and could affect how many Chinese people drive.

World Car Free Day is similar to No Car Day but is a more worldwide event. They also had martial law on specific roads that you were prohibited to drive on in 2015, leading up to the Military Parade. Chinese people had to obey those laws of not driving and that helped the environment. By cutting back cars and emission during the Military Parade created a beautiful sky. When it was over and everything went back to normal, the sky began to go back to smog filled. The other events that are similar in aspect to No Car Day are London Freewheel and Unplug America.
