= Car-free days =

Day promoting car-free travel

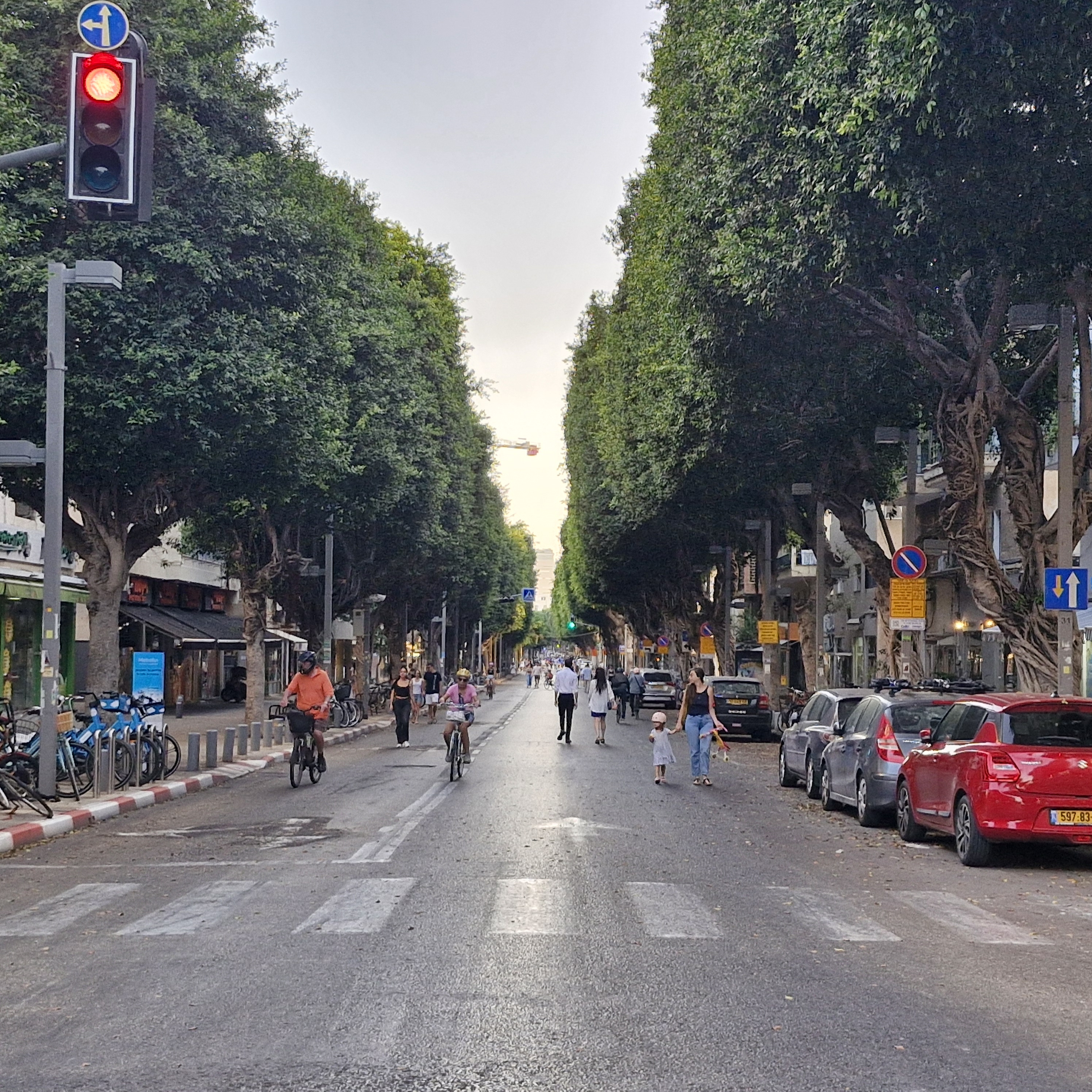
A car free day on Dizengoff Street, in Tel Aviv, Israel

On car-free days (CFD), people are encouraged either through state policy or by societal consensus to travel by means other than cars. Some cities, like Jakarta and Tehran, have weekly car-free days. Other such days are annual. World Car Free Day is celebrated on September 22. Organized events are held in some cities and countries. In Israel, the holiday of Yom Kippur is regarded as a car-free day through societal consensus without official policy enforcement.

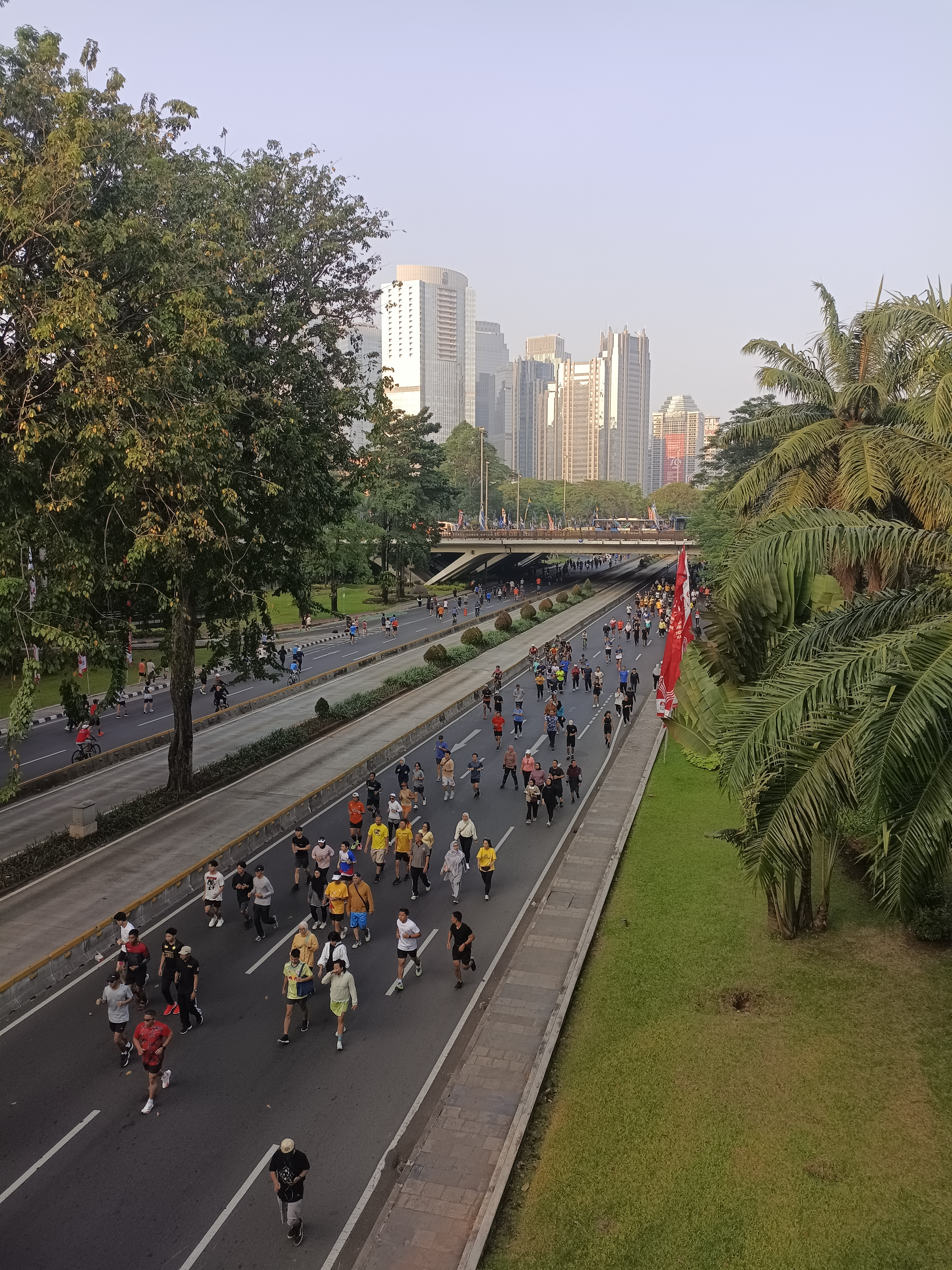
Jakarta weekly Car Free Day, 2024

The events, which vary by location, give motorists and commuters an idea of their locality with fewer cars. The concept dates from the 1970s but was popularised in the 1990s. Tel Aviv has had a car-free day due to Yom Kippur since 1935.

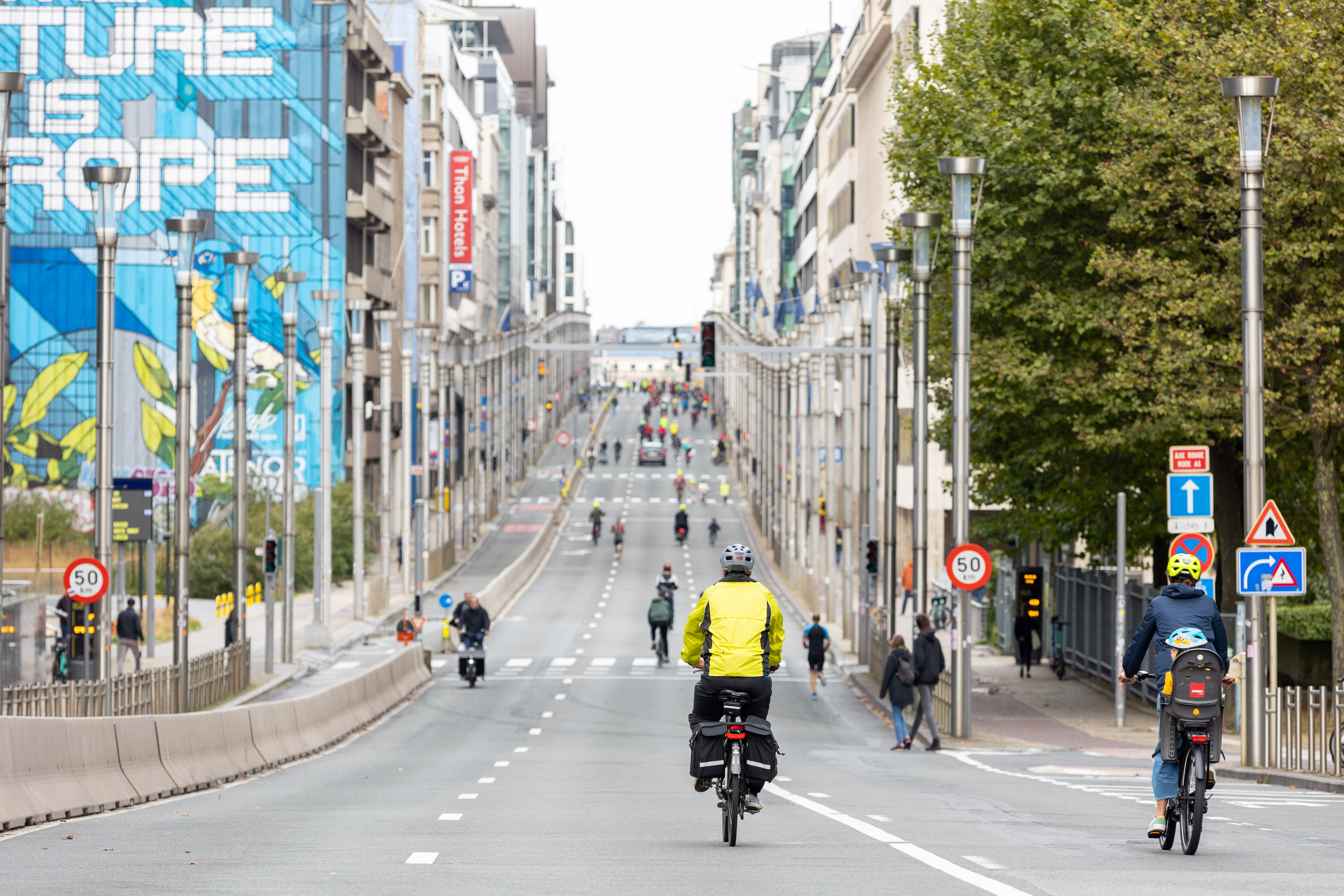
Brussels Car Free Day, 2022

Currently Bogotá holds the world's largest car-free weekday event covering the entire city. The first car-free day was held in February 2000 and became institutionalised through a public referendum.

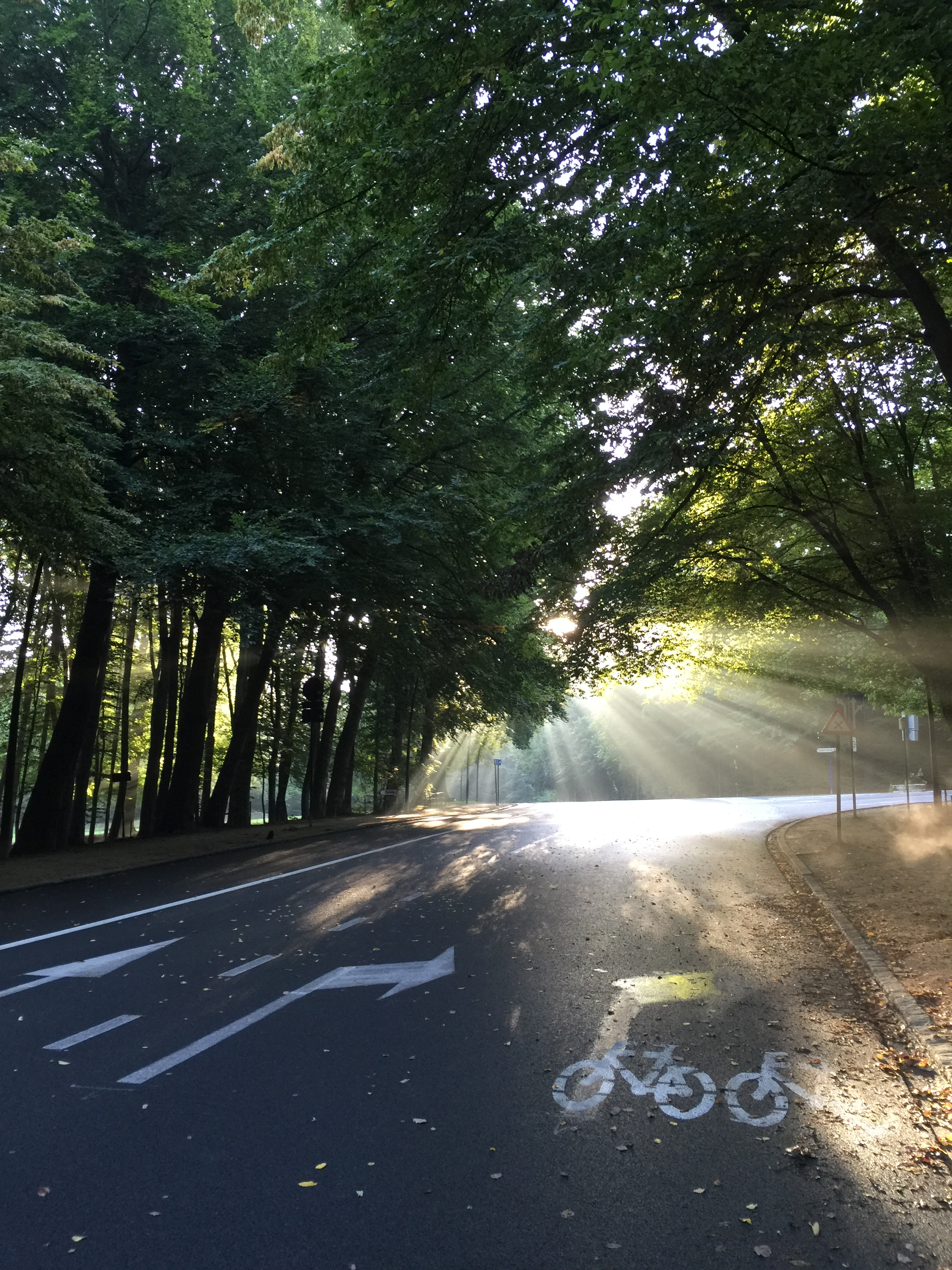
The Bois de la Cambre Car-Free Days, 2015

== History and timeline ==
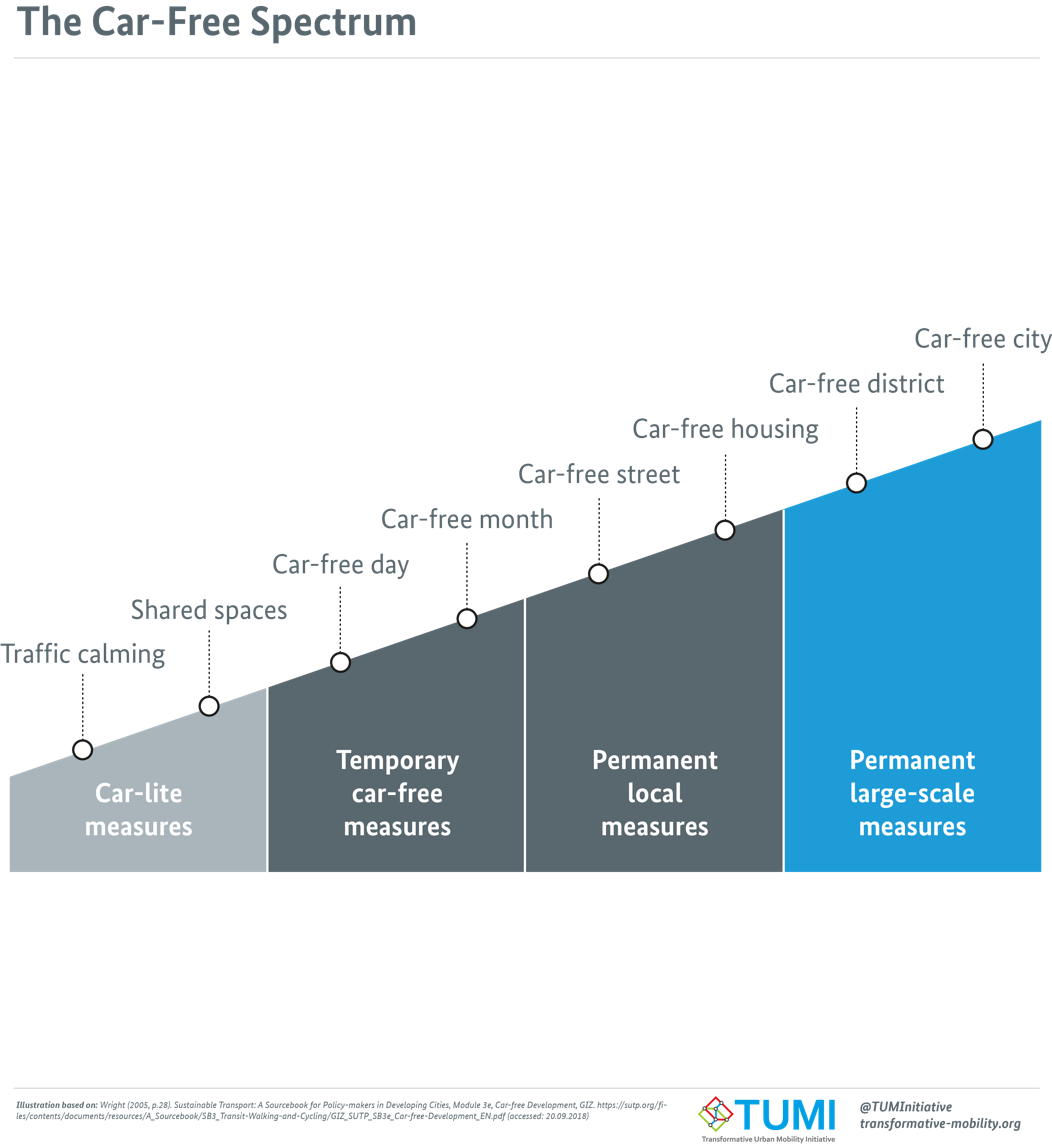
Car-free days are one of many car-free movement practices.

=== Origins ===
While projects along these lines had taken place from time to time on an ad hoc basis starting with the 1973 oil crisis, it was only in October 1994 that a structured call for such projects was issued in a keynote speech by Eric Britton at the International Ciudades Accessibles (Accessible Cities) Conference held in Toledo, Spain.

Within two years the first Days were organized in Reykjavík (Iceland), Bath (United Kingdom) and La Rochelle (France), and the informal World Car Free Days Consortium was organized in 1995 to support Car-Free Days worldwide. The first national campaign was inaugurated in Britain by the Environmental Transport Association in 1997, the French followed suit in 1998 as In town, without my car! and was established as a Europe-wide initiative by the European Commission in 2000. In the same year the Commission enlarged the program to a full European Mobility Week which now is the major focus of the Commission, with the Car-Free Day part of a greater new mobility whole.

In 1996, a Dutch action group, Pippi Autoloze Zondag, started a national campaign for car free days. Pippi organized monthly illegal street actions to take over the streets and stop the cars. After blocking the streets, there would be parties, picknicks, kids playing, rollerskate on the motorway, street painting and music artists playing. The police would break the party down and make arrests. Pippi went on to create a Dutch national group to fight for car free days. Pippi lobbied every single national parliament politician from the Netherlands and inspired Dutch national parties to adopt the concept of car free days in their agenda. Every major city government in the Netherlands received Pippi's proposals to implement car free days, forcing them to debate the issue. After two years of actions, several cities in the Netherlands relented and started to implement car free days.

The Environmental Transport Association set the initial annual Car-Free Day on the first Tuesday in their Green Transport Week (around 17 June). In 2000 it was agreed to make it a self-standing day held on September 22, originally as a pan-European day organised under the auspices of the European Commission and later with international extensions—during which a large number of cities around the world are invited to close their centers to cars. Pedestrians, bicycles, public transit and other forms of sustainable transportation are encouraged on these days. People can reflect on what their city would look like with a lot fewer cars, and what might be needed to make this happen. Advocates claim that over 100 million people in 1,500 cities celebrate International Car-Free Day, though on days and in ways of their choice.

Also in 2000, car free days went global with a World Carfree Day program launched by Carbusters, now World Carfree Network, and in the same year the Earth Car Free Day collaborative program of the Earth Day Network and the World Car Free Days collaborative.

=== Timeline of notable car free related events ===
- 1935: Tel Aviv, Israel - is first reported to hold a car free day in respect to Yom Kippur. Prior to the 1930s, vehicles were used during the holy day.
- 25 November 1956 – 20 January 1957: Low Countries. The first car-free Sundays in the Netherlands and Belgium because of the Suez crisis. Every Sunday was car-free.
- 1958: New York City. Demonstrations of neighbors of the Washington Square Park area of New York City eventually block a proposed extension of Fifth Avenue, which would have eliminated this popular public park and social oasis.
- 1961: New York City. One of the ringleaders of the 1958 demonstration, Jane Jacobs, publishes The Death and Life of Great American Cities, Vintage Books, opening up the discussions of car restraint in cities.
- October 1968: Groningen, Netherlands. First neighborhood Woonerf. The goal of this project led by local residents is to claim back the street from cars and create safe space for people.
- 1972, Delft, Netherlands. First official Woonerf opens.
- 1973, Abbaye de Royaumont, France. The OECD Development Center and EcoPlan (The Commons) organize a 4-day international brainstorm on combining car restraint and non-conventional or "in-between" transit (paratransit) in Third World cities.
- 1973–1974; due to the oil crisis, Denmark had car-free Sundays from 25 November 1973 to 10 February 1974.
- January–February 1974, Switzerland. Four car-free Sundays were organized during the "Oil Crisis".
- 1981, East Germany (DDR). First German Car-free Day took place.
- October 1988, Paris. "Cities without Cars?" program begins. International, unstructured, non-bureaucratic, topic-driven, long term cooperative program is launched by EcoPlan and the Commons. It later morphed into today's New Mobility Agenda.
- September 1991, New York City. First International Conference on Auto-Free Cities. Organized by Transportation Alternatives.
- September 1992, Toronto. Second International Conference on Auto-Free Cities.
- September 1992, San Francisco. Critical Mass. More or less anarchist, at least self-organizing, group cranked up to take back the streets from cars.
- Fall 1992, Paris, France. First @ccess Forum opened in cooperation with ECTF on Internet. Carfree Day concept discussed and expanded on this international list.
- Fall 1992, Ottawa, Canada. Auto-Free Ottawa Newsletter started.
- March 1994, Amsterdam. Car-Free Cities Network launched by DG XI and Eurocities.
- 14 October 1994, Toledo, Spain. Thursday: Carfree Day Proposal, work plan and public call for international collaboration is presented at Spanish "Ciudades Accesibles" Congress. (Representatives of Car-Free Cities and later Reykjavík, Bath and La Rochelle CFD projects all present.)

==== 1996–2000 ====
- 8 May 1996, Copenhagen. Copenhagen Declaration is issued by international meeting of European government groups.
- June 1996, Reykjavík, Iceland. Carfree Day is organized by local government and held in Iceland's capital city.
- 11 June 1996, Bath, the first British Carfree Day organised within the Environmental Transport Association's Green Transport Week.
- 17 June 1997, Weybridge, the world's first national Car-Free Day inaugurated by the Environmental Transport Association in Britain. The ETA co-ordinates the annual CFDs.
- 9 September 1997, La Rochelle, France. Journée sans voiture. Led by Mayor Michel Crépeau and Jacques Tallut, La Rochelle organize France's first real CFD.
- 21 October 1997, Paris. Thursday: Carfree Day proposal made to French Ministry of the Environment. Proposal from this Consortium made as part of the Common's "Smogbuster" package for fighting car-related pollution and other problems in French cities. (The Ministry used this foundation to launch its own "En ville, sans ma voiture?" program one year later.)
- 26 October – 1 November 1997, Lyon, France. Towards Carfree Cities I conference. Organized by European Youth for Action and the Lyon-based Régroupement pour une ville sans voiture. Carbusters Magazine & Resource Centre launched.
- Winter 1997, Amsterdam. Carfree Times published Volume 1, Number 1 (with no public support and made freely available).
- Winter, 1997, Paris. @World Carfree Day Consortium. This open NGO site is established by The Commons as part of their long term New Mobility program on the WWW to support Carfree Day organization and expert follow-up in cities all over the world.
- 21 June 1998. Mobil Ohne Auto, Germany-wide Car Free Mobility Day.
- 22 September 1998, "En ville, sans ma voiture?", France. French Ministry of the Environment and 34 French cities organized "En ville, sans ma voiture?" ("A day in the city without my car?).
- 1 December 1999, Britain. First National ETA Carfree Planning support (UK) sharing information on planning for European Carfree Day in Britain
- 19 September 1999, Netherlands. First National Carfree Sunday in the Netherlands.
- 22 September 1999, First European "Pilot Day". On Wednesday, 22 September 1999, 66 French towns participate in "En ville, sans ma voiture ?" (2nd edition), while in parallel 92 Italian towns organize the first Italian National Carfree Day, "In cittá senza la mia auto". The Canton of Geneva also participates in what later was later called the first European "Pilot Day", wherein all the participating cities designated car-free areas in their centers.
- Sunday, 26 September 1999. First Belgian CFD announced.
- 1 December 1999, Britain. Consortium of interested individuals and groups set up the first independent national support group on Web to promote CFDs in Britain (see menu to left for direct link)
- Sunday, 6 February 2000, Italy. Environment Minister Edo Ronchi opens first of four successive Car-Free Sundays in Italy, to take place on the first Sunday of the month for the next four months.
- 24 February 2000, Bogotá, Colombia. The Bogotá Challenge. The City of Bogotá organizes Sin mi carro en Bogotá in cooperation with the World Carfree Day Consortium, the world's first large scale "Thursday" CFD project, and launches its Bogotá Challenge to the rest of the world.
- 10–18 June 2000, British Green Transport Week organised by the Environmental Transport Association.
- 24–27 June 2000, Bremen, Germany. Car Free Cities conference in Bremen.
- 21 September 2000. World Carfree Day – first global carfree day, launched and promoted by Carbusters (now World Carfree Network) and Adbusters Media Foundation.
- 22 September 2000. First European Carfree Day. The government sponsors report that 760 European towns jointly organized the first pan-European "In town, without my car!" day. Perhaps indicating growing confidence, the question mark has now become an exclamation point.
- 14 October 2000. Chengdu City of Sichuan Province, People's Republic of China, starts the first ever "Car-Free Day" in that nation.
- 29 October 2000. Bogotá holds the world's first Car Free Referendum (which passes with flying colors).
- 1 November 2000. Earth Carfree Day program launched by the Commons and WC/FD Consortium in cooperation with Earth Day Network.
- 23 November 2000 Shed Your Car Day – Fremantle. First Australian CFD.

==== 2001–2005 ====
- 1 February 2001. Bogotá launches the first ECFD 2001 project with its second Dia sin Carro.
- Spring 2001. "Domeniche ecologiche 2001" – The Italian Ministry of the Environment organises the first Ecological Sundays car-free program, running on five weekends.
- 19 April 2001. First Earth Carfree Day. More than 300 groups and cities around the world participate in this first ECFD organised by The Commons WC/FD program and Earth Day Network.
- September 2001. Second European CFD and second World Carfree Day.
- September 22, 2001. Toronto becomes the first North American city to officially host a Carfree Day.
- November 2001. United Nations contacts The Commons and proposed a joint world level project: the United Nations Carfree Days Programme, to be organized as a run-up to the Johannesburg World Summit on Sustainable Development, demonstrating that this approach is one that can make a difference.

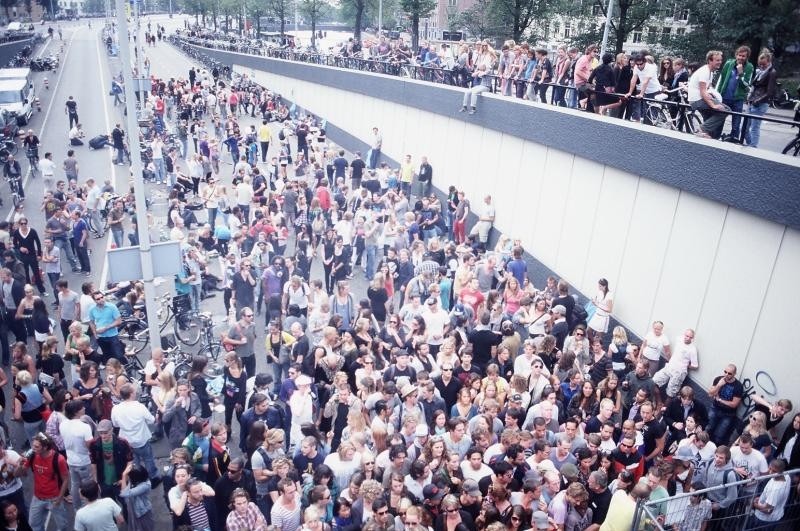
Car-free day in the Netherlands in 2002

- 6–8 February 2002. First United National Regional Carfree Days Practicum organized for Latin America, in cooperation with and support of the third Carfree Day in Bogotá, Colombia. Practicum brings together a delegation of mayors from across the region to observe and exchange information on the CFD approach for their cities.
- 8–10 May 2002. Second UN Carfree Day Demonstration and Practicum for Regional Mayors took place in Fremantle, West Australia.
- 19 April 2002. First European Mobility Week launched by EC in Brussels. Planned as annual event in September as part of their "In town without my car!" program.
- 22 September 2002. Third World Carfree Day, promoted by Carbusters (now World Carfree Network) and Adbusters Media Foundation.
- 2002. Canadian Carfree Day Network established, and is active in a growing number of cities, including Toronto, Montreal, Ottawa and Winnipeg.
- April 2003. Towards Car-Free Cities III, Prague, Czech Republic, organised by Carbusters (now World Carfree Network).
- September 2003. Montreal becomes the first Canadian city to hold a major downtown, weekday street closure for automobiles.
- September 2003, Camden, UK. Camden celebrates the first Travelwise Week building on Carfree Days celebrated every year since 2000.
- 22 September 2003. Fourth World Carfree Day, promoted by World Carfree Network and Adbusters Media Foundation.
- July 2004. Towards Car-Free Cities IV, Humboldt University, Berlin, organised by World Carfree Network in partnership with Autofrei Wohnen, Autofrei Leben!, BUND (Friends of the Earth Germany), ITDP Europe, and other German organisations.
- 19 to 24 September 2004. Toronto's first New Mobility Week launched a public enquiry into new less-car packages of policies and measures.
- 16–23 September 2004. European Mobility Week.
- 22 September 2004 "In town, without my car!", organized by the European Commission and national partners.
- 22 September 2004. Fifth World Carfree Day, promoted by World Carfree Network and Adbusters Media Foundation.
- July 2005. Towards Car-Free Cities V, Budapest, Hungary, organised by World Carfree Network and Clean Air Action Group, in partnership with Hungarian Traffic Club and Hungarian Young Greens.

==== 2006 onwards ====
- 22 September 2006. Car Free Day on Yonge Street and Yonge Dundas Square. The first downtown weekday street closure for automobiles in celebration of Toronto Car Free Day.
- 22 October 2007. Car Free Day in Jakarta, Indonesia, organized by Jakarta municipal government. The Car Free Day closed Jakarta's main avenues such as Jalan Thamrin and Jalan Sudirman from cars, and invited locals to have their sports and activities on the street. Since then, Car Free Day has become a weekly event in Jakarta, held on every Sunday.
- 22 October 2007. Car Free Day in Kaohsiung, Taiwan, organised by the Kaohsiung City Council. Thousands cycled from the Tower of Light to Singuang Ferry Wharf. All city public transportation service was made for free for a week from 22 to 28 September 2007. Kaohsiung has celebrated International Car Free Day since 2004. This year's slogan was 熄火愛地球, 高雄齊步走. A total of 1953 towns and cities participate from 38 countries around the world.

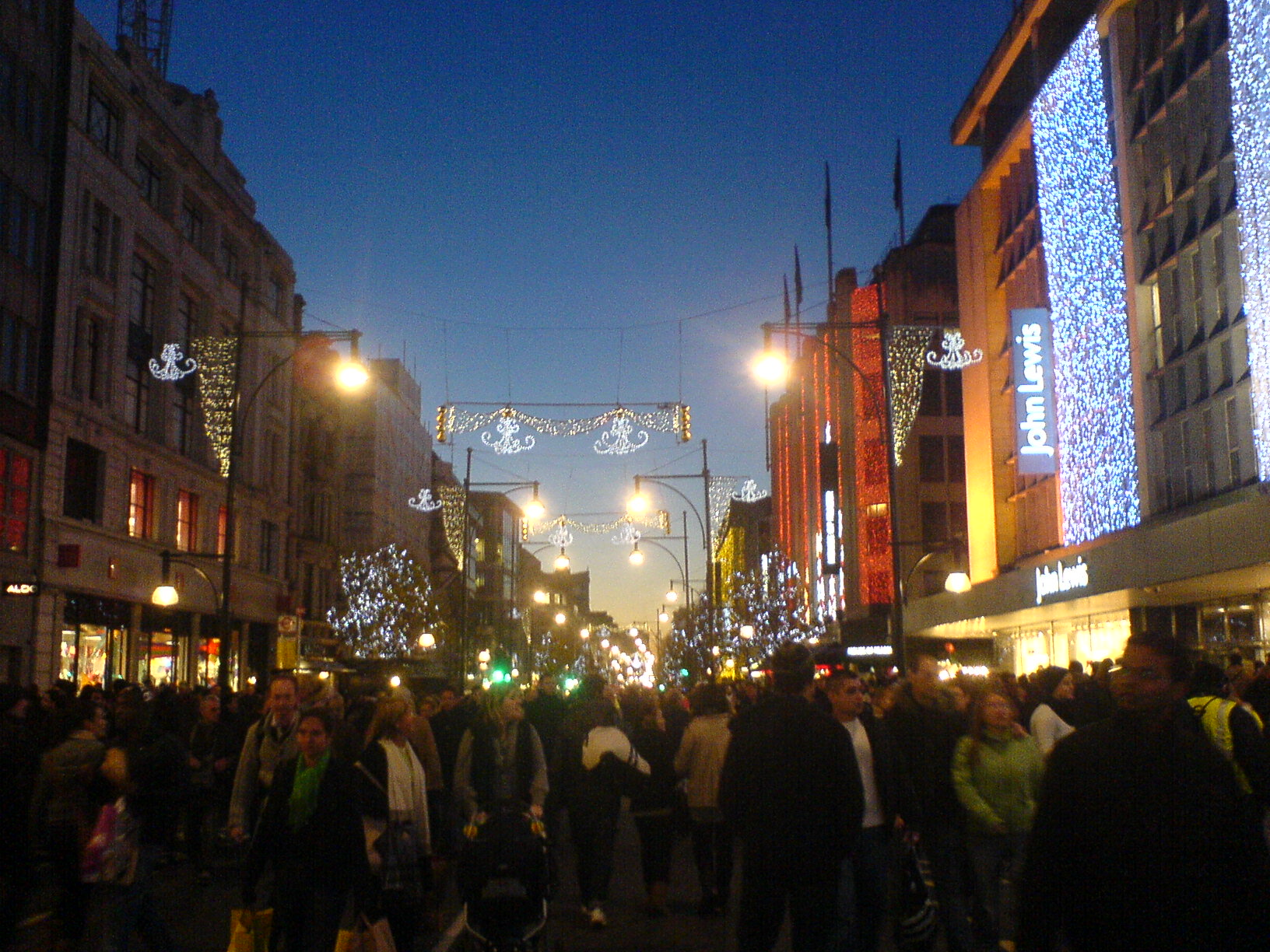
Car-free Oxford Street, London, 2008. Oxford Street is proverbial for its air pollution.

- 16–20 June 2008. Towards Carfree Cities Conference VIII in Portland, Oregon, organized by SHIFT.
- 21 September 2008. Annual Car Free Day in the Netherlands. At least 22 cities such as Nijmegen, Tilburg, Rotterdam, Arnhem, and Gouda are car-free.
- 28 September 2008. Car Free Day at Wood Green High Road, London, UK.
- 29 September 2009. World Car Free Day celebrated in Washington, D.C., with free bike repairs, yoga classes and groups that encourage environmentally friendly lives. One such group was involved in petitioning avid car users to go car-free for the first time.

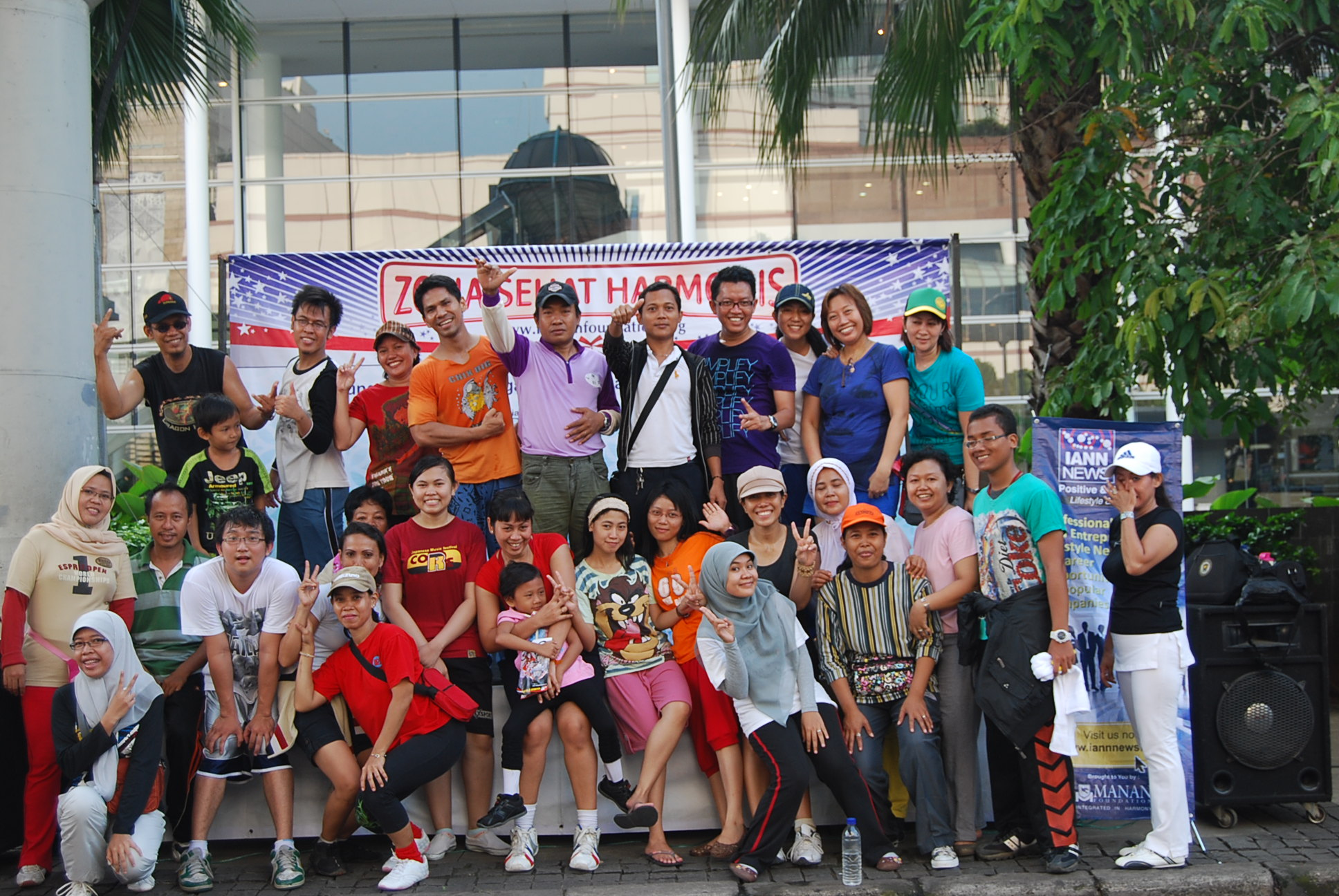
Indonesia, 2011

- 2 June 2012. Carless Sunday at F. Ortigas Jr. Road, Ortigas Center, Barangay San Antonio, Pasig, Philippines.
- 22 September 2013 Kuala Lumpur had its first Car Free Morning Program in the heart of the city's Golden Triangle promoted by Datuk Naim Mohamad and the Mayor of City Hall Kuala Lumpur Dato Seri Ahmad Feisal.
- 17 November 2013 onwards. Raahgiri Day ('Raahgiri' being Hindi for 'Way of the road'), the first sustained car free day in India was launched in Gurgaon. Subsequently, Raahgiri days have been held in 70 cities in 18 states across India.
- 20 September 2014. First bike-tourism Caracas 2014 in Caracas, Venezuela. A previous initiative to celebrate World Car Free Day.
- 27 September 2015, 'Paris sans Voiture' with city centre mostly free of cars and lower speed limit in other districts.
- 28 February 2016. First Car Free Sunday in the central business district to be celebrated with mass events in Singapore.
- 29 September 2016. Minneapolis, Minnesota, US, celebrates World Car Free Day.
- 21 September 2019, London, UK, closes more than 16 miles of central London roads as part of Car Free Day.

== Regional car-free days ==
- In town, without my car! is an EU campaign.
- In Israel, during Yom Kippur, a car free day is practised by consensus by Jewish society. On Saturday, religious Jews refrain from using cars except for emergencies.
- Carfree days are also held in many U.S. cities, such as Portland, Oregon; and in Japan.
- British Columbia hosts several Car Free Days organized by local communities, including those in Car Free Day Vancouver, Car Free Day North Vancouver, and Car Free Day Victoria.
- Since 22 September 2007, Jakarta has made Car Free Day a regular event, holding it three times a year. However, since 2012, the Jakarta Car Free Day has become a weekly event; held every Sundays morning around Sudirman-Thamrin avenues. Since 2026, Car-Free Day is also held at the northern half of the Rasuna Said avenue.
- At Bangkok's celebration of World Car-Free Day 2018, celebrated on 22 September, Bangkok's Deputy Governor, Sakoltee Phattiyakul, who presided over the event, arrived in his official automobile, as did his entourage. He then mounted a bicycle for a ceremonial ride. Prior to the event, which encouraged not using cars, the Bangkok Metropolitan Administration announced there would be extensive free automobile parking spaces available for participants who were to ride bicycles in the parade.
- Bogotá has celebrated car free day since 24 February 2000. This is an initiative to preserve the environment and to reflect about the use of the public transportation system.
- China has an irregular event called No Car Day
- In the Philippines, several cities and private developments have car-free days, where roads are closed at specific hours on Sundays to encourage walking, exercise, and other recreational activities.

== Car Free Day Call ==
The 1994 Car Free Day Call set out a challenge for a city, neighborhood or group:

- To spend one carefully prepared day without cars.
- To study and observe closely what exactly goes on during that day.
- Then, to reflect publicly and collectively on the lessons of this experience and on what might be prudently and creatively done next to build on these.

The exercise considered car users to be "addicts" who need to be "treated" in some way. The organisers considered this to mean that motorists should have no choice but to be without cars, at least for a time. In this particular instance the proposed "treatment" was to find an answer to the following question in three main parts:

- Is it possible to get drivers out of their cars in one or more cities...
- In ways that will be tolerable in a pluralistic democracy...
- For at least long enough to demonstrate what needs to happen to make a car-less (or, more accurately, less-car) urban transport paradigm actually work?

== Impact ==
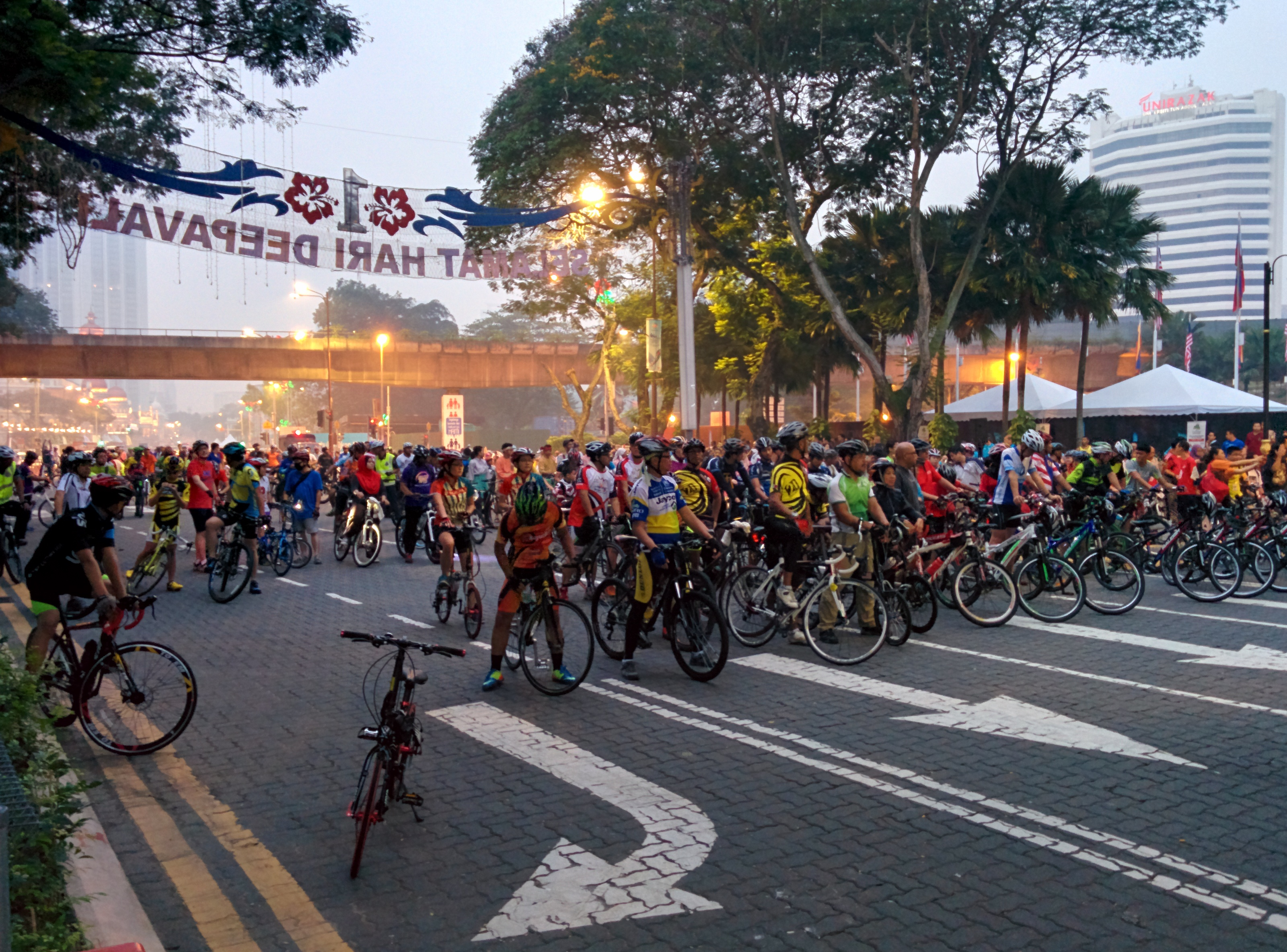
Car-free day in Kuala Lumpur

According to The Washington Post, the event "promotes improvement of mass transit, cycling and walking, and the development of communities where jobs are closer to home and where shopping is within walking distance". Studies showed that for short trips in cities, one can reach more quickly using a bicycle rather than using a car.

== Related concepts ==
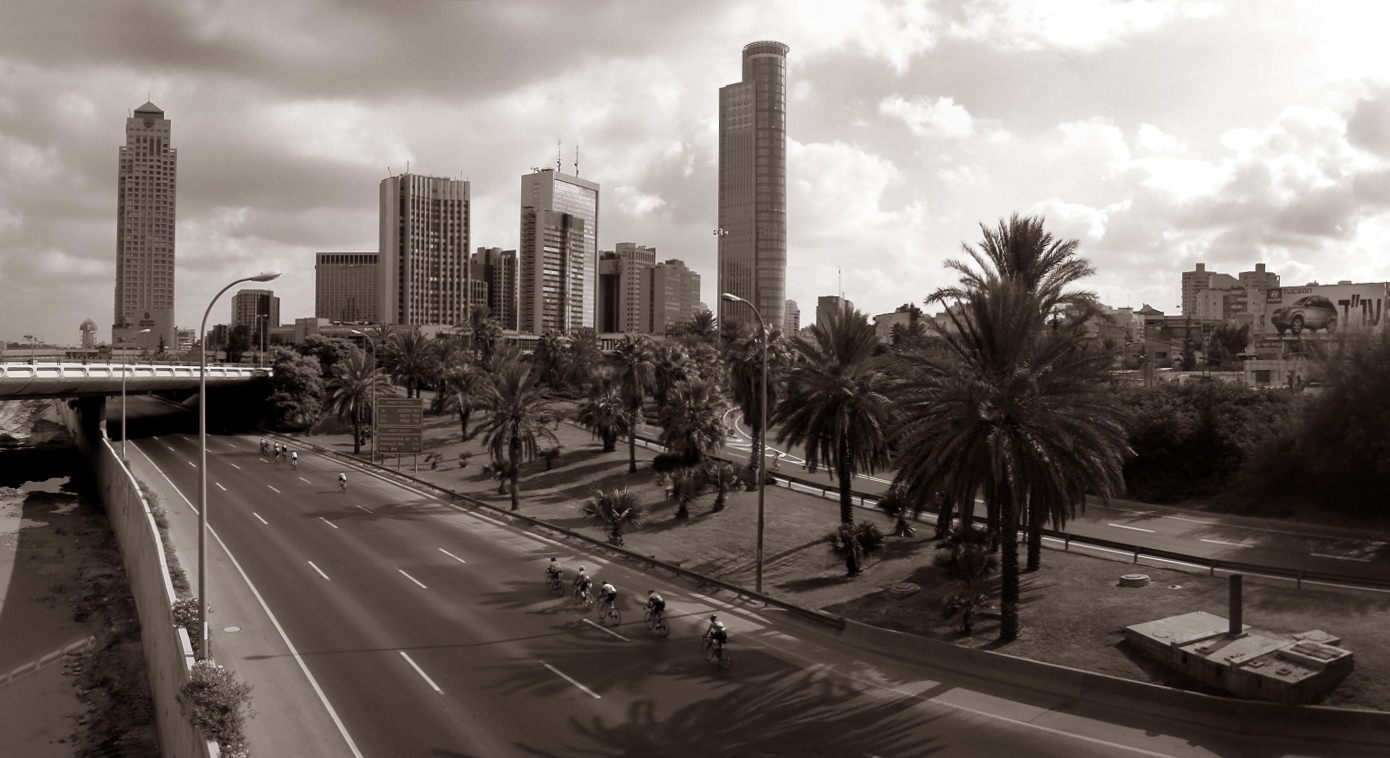
Cyclists ride down the deserted Ayalon Highway in Tel Aviv on Yom Kippur.

While not an officially organized car-free day, every year traffic in Israel stops (except for emergency vehicles) for more than 24 hours in observance of Yom Kippur. This encompasses all motorized vehicles, including cars and public transportation (buses, trains, taxis, airplanes etc.). Cycling enthusiasts of the Hiloni stream and other religions take advantage of this, and roads (except in religious neighborhoods) become de facto promenades and cycleways. Air pollution in Israel that day, measured by nitrogen oxides, dropped by 99 percent. Prior to the 1930s vehicles were still used on Yom Kippur. During the 1950s and 1960s, cars were used by some Jews on Yom Kippur; however following the Yom Kippur war, all sectors of Jewish society stopped using cars on Yom Kippur. In 1979 it was first reported that Israelis were using the day to cycle. The non-usage of vehicles by Jews is a societal consensus and is not enforced by any law.

== See also ==
- Block party
- Car-free days in the Philippines
- Car-free movement
- Car-free zone
- Carfree city
- Carless days (New Zealand political history)
- Congestion pricing
- Critical Mass
- Cyclovia
- Effects of the car on societies
- Environmentalism
- Hoy No Circula (Mexico)
- In town, without my car! (EU)
- List of car-free places
- Mayor of London's Sky Ride
- Motorist day, car-related observance celebrating the institution of driving
- No Car Day (China)
- Reclaim the Streets
- Road pricing
- Road space rationing (traffic restraint by license plate number)
- Spare the air day (San Francisco Bay Area)
- Urban vitality
- World Carfree Network
