= European Mobility Week =

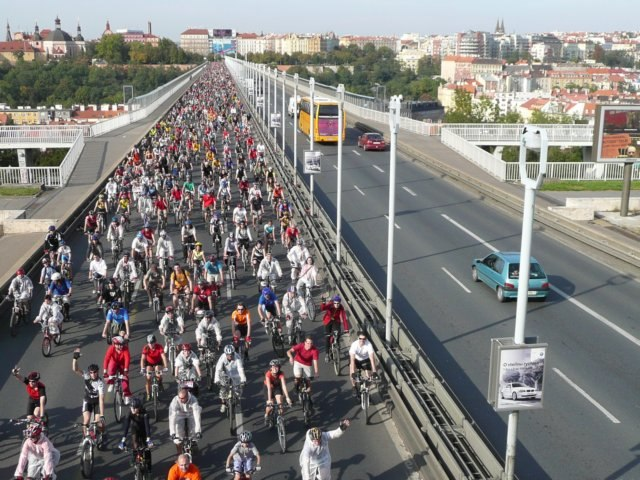
Cycling critical mass during a car-free day in Prague, EMW 2008

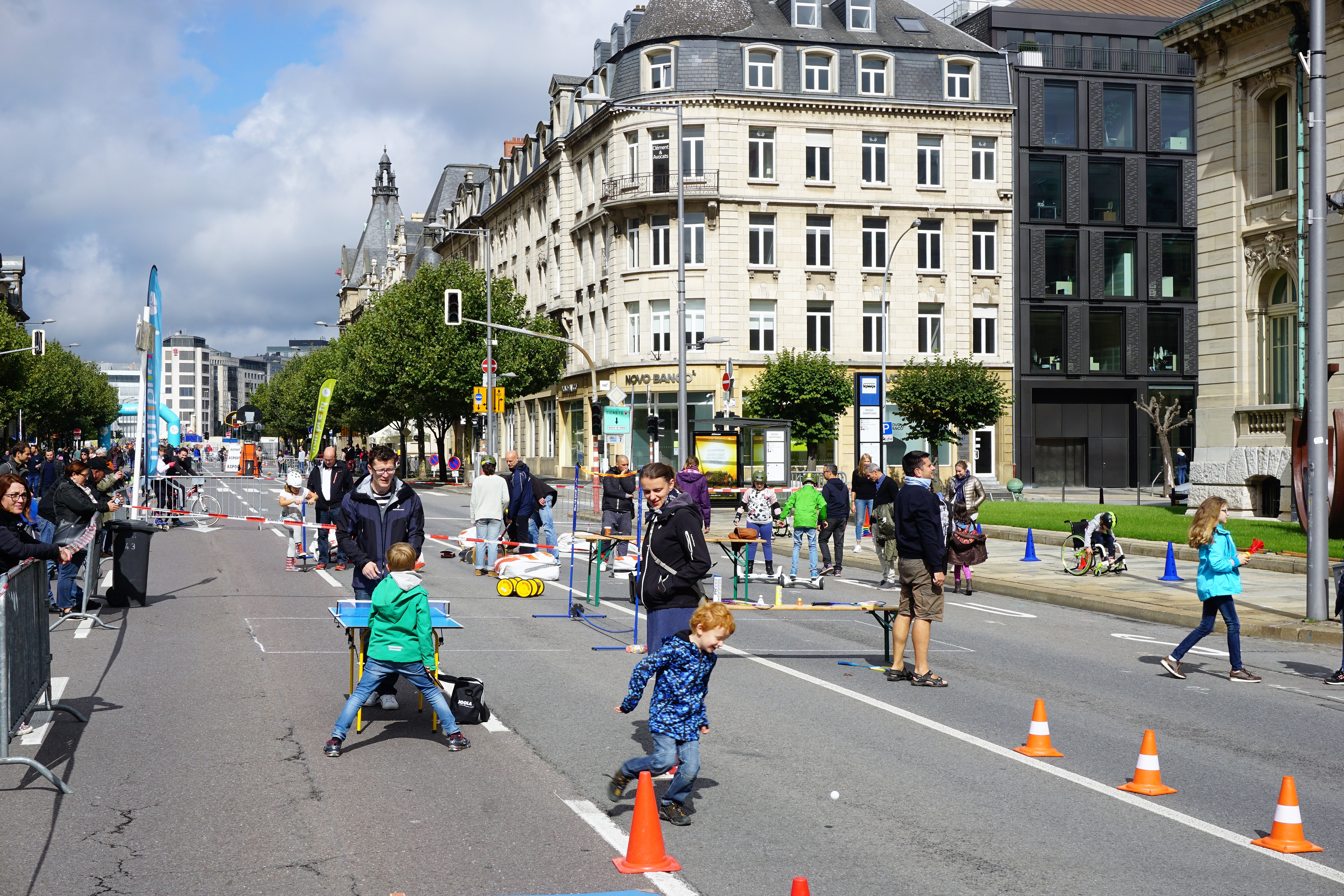
Street closed for cars and opened for pedestrians and cyclist in Luxembourg during EMW 2017

European Mobility Week (shortened as EMW) is an annual initiative of the European Commission for Sustainable Urban Mobility since 2002. It calls on European cities and towns to devote one week to sustainable mobility. It starts on September 16 and ends with a Car-Free Day on September 22. Every year, EMW has a specific motto, such as clean air, multimodality or sharing economy. EMW includes traffic-related events, happenings such as cycling critical masses, temporary closures of streets for cars – opening them for pedestrians and cyclists.

It has 44 Participating countries in 2019, with total 1820 cities.
