= Car-free movement =

Movement to reduce the use of private vehicles

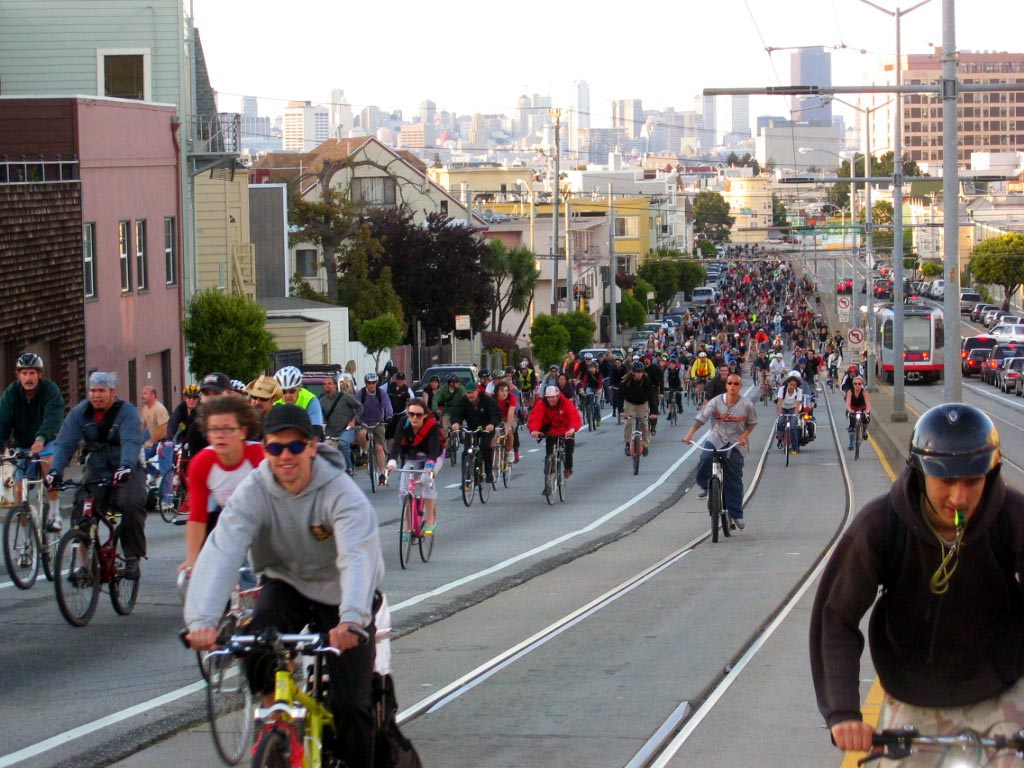
San Francisco Critical Mass in 2005

The car-free movement is a social movement that advocates for car-free cities, centered on the belief that large and/or high-speed motorized vehicles (cars, trucks, tractor units, motorcycles, etc.) have become excessively dominant in modern life, particularly in urban areas such as cities and suburbs. It is a broad, informal, emergent network of individuals and organizations, including social activists, urban planners, transportation engineers and environmentalists, among others. The goal of the movement is to establish places where motorized vehicle use is greatly reduced or eliminated, by converting road and parking space to other public uses and rebuilding compact urban environments where most destinations are within easy reach by other means, including walking, cycling, public transport, personal transporters, and mobility as a service.

== History ==
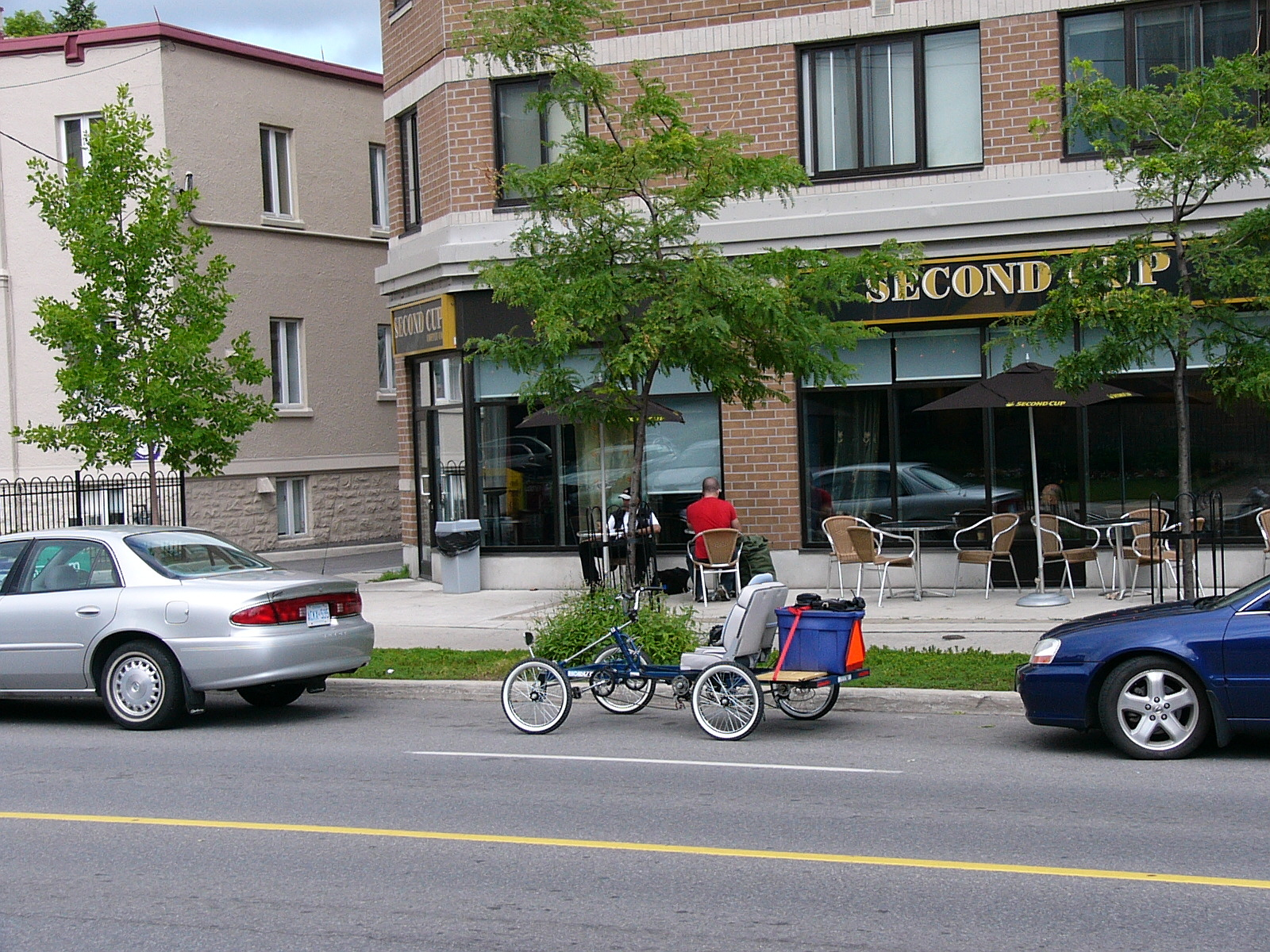
A quadracycle parked on a Canadian urban street between cars

Before the twentieth century, cities and towns were usually compact, containing narrow streets busy with human activity. In the early twentieth century, many of these settlements were adapted to accommodate the car with wider roads, more car parking spaces, and lower population densities, with space between urban buildings reserved for automotive use. In 1925, Los Angeles became the first American city to adopt a traffic ordinance that subordinated pedestrians to motor vehicles on city streets, and this became a model for the whole nation.

Lower population densities caused urban sprawl with longer distances between locations. This also brought traffic congestion which made older transport methods unattractive or impractical, and created the conditions for more traffic and sprawl; the car system was "increasingly able to 'drive' out competitors, such as feet, bikes, buses and trains". This process led to changes in urban form and living patterns that offered little opportunity for people without a car. Walking as a primary means of transport fell sharply in place of driving, though this did not indicate preferences.

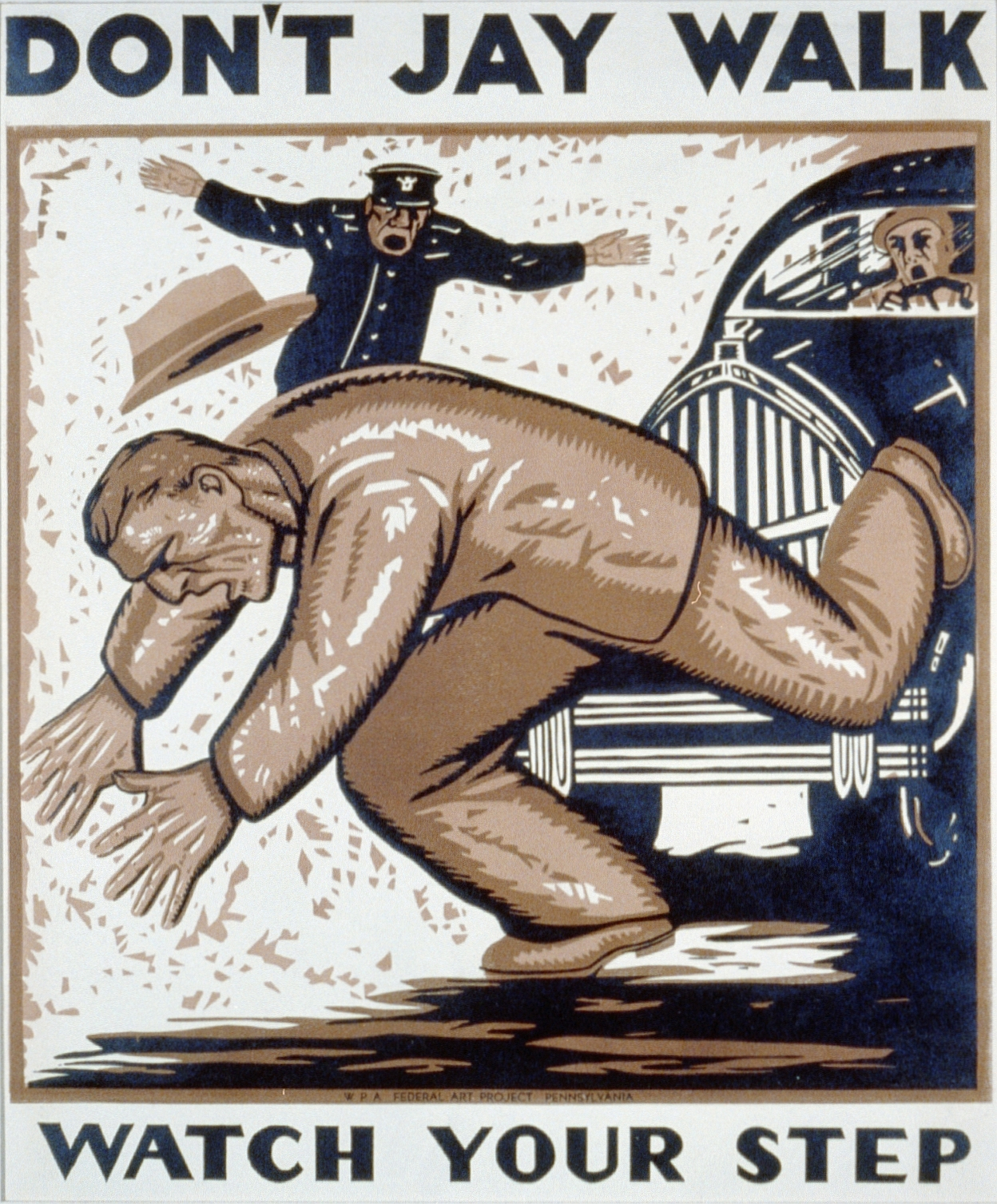
An anti-jaywalking poster created in 1937 as part of the United States WPA's Federal Art Project

In the 1920s, the word jaywalker was coined, and it effectively shifted the responsibility for pedestrian safety from motorists to pedestrians. The transition towards a car society had started, but there was resistance. In 1924, W.B. wrote in the New York Times "The automobile looms up as a far more destructive piece of mechanism than the machine gun. The reckless motorist deals more death than the artilleryman. The man in the street seems less safe than the man in the trench." In 1925 Michigan created the first gas tax, and soon roads were funded through state and federal gas taxes, while sidewalks remained the responsibility of local governments.

Anti-car sentiment penetrated popular culture, with one well-known example being David H. Keller's 1928 short story The revolt of the pedestrian with Hugo Gernsback which appeared in Amazing Stories. It was set in a dystopic future where pedestrians are hunted like animals by motorists whose legs have become vestigal. The pedestrians eventually fight back, destroying electrical infrastructure and killing many motorists.

Several attempts to organize pedestrian organizations occurred, but they lacked staying power and more than a regional presence. These included the 1922 Walkers’ League in Los Angeles, the 1924 Pedestrians’ Protective League in Los Angeles, the 1927 Pedestrians’ Mutual Protective Association in Baltimore, and the 1930 Association for Protection to Pedestrians in Chicago.

By the late 1920s, complaints about the safety of streets for pedestrians became a frequent topic in letters to the editor. First the Studebaker company in 1925, and then later the American Automobile Association in the 1930s, were major players in establishing the profession of traffic engineer to incorporate car-friendly designs into urban planning. The car manufacturer and then the auto club funded the creation of the profession and established the orthodoxy that still persists today. By the 1950s, 100% of cities with a population over 500,000 had full-time traffic engineers, as well as 92% with a population between 200,000 and 500,000, 77% between 100,000 and 200,000, and 50% between 50,000 and 100,000. Cities without regulated their duties to a city engineer.

The greatest cause of pedestrian fatalities is ignorance on the part of the pedestrian, who does not know he is nearly invisible to motorists and that it is much more difficult to control an automobile than his own actions.

— Burton Marsh, Director of the Traffic Engineering and Safety Department of the American Automobile Association in 1938

The transition to car first spaces did have opposition. In 1930, Detroit Public Works Commissioner John Reid demanded sidewalks along all Michigan highways in response to increasing traffic fatalities, saying "organized motordom has devoted the majority of its attention to the improvement of highways for vehicular use, mankind is still created with feet rather than rubber tires."

As walking in urban areas designed for driving progressively made walking less practical, the mere act of walking could be enough to raise suspicion by police. Famously, in 1949, Ray Bradbury's short story "The Pedestrian" was inspired by an experience he had walking at night in Los Angeles. A police officer stopped and questioned him to the point that Bradbury became unsettled and confused. The story describes a future where no one walks, instead staying inside glued to their screens.

By the 1950s, the responsibility for avoiding collisions now fell primarily on pedestrians. Illustration from municipal model ordinance from American Automobile Association, 1958

In a 1958 report by the American Automobile Association, they claim that 132,270 urban traffic deaths occurred between 1937 and 1956, compared to 93,410 non-pedestrians. In the same report, they blame that "pedestrians are too apathetic" and "point to the pedestrian as a major traffic safety problem in large cities." They also foreshadow the future in their observation that "[p]edestrians have neither demanded adequate attention to date, nor have they adequately accepted their responsibility for self-protection. Does it seem curious that here in the United States, where practically every group with common occupation and interest is organized in some degree or other, this very large mass of people with serious common hazards has no organization or accredited spokesman?

Criminalization of pedestrians often exceeded that of drivers. For example, in 1956 in Detroit, Michigan, 19,765 pedestrians were arrested for jaywalking, yet only 8,662 drivers were arrested for violating the pedestrian's right of way. In Cleveland, Ohio, 7,070 pedestrians were arrested in for jaywalking, but only 790 drivers for violating right of way. The biggest discrepancy among major cities was Portland, Oregon, with its 25,119 arrests for jaywalking but only 857 for violating pedestrian's right of way.

Enforcement of pedestrian ordinances in 12 cities in 1956
	Pedestrian jaywalking		Driver violating pedestrian right-of-way
City	Arrests	Warnings	Arrests
San Francisco, California	165	0	7,304
Detroit, Michigan	19,765	0	8,662
Cleveland, Ohio	7,171	0	790
Cincinnati, Ohio	6,780	755	-
Milwaukee, Wisconsin	997	3,614	-
Oakland, California	3,037	0	1,398
Indianapolis, Indiana	21,455	7,557	744
Dayton, Ohio	458	215	95
Portland, Oregon	25,119	0	857
Fort Worth, Texas	1,405	0	54
Richmond, Virginia	2,281	0	594
Seattle, Washington	5,734	0	762

== Urban design ==
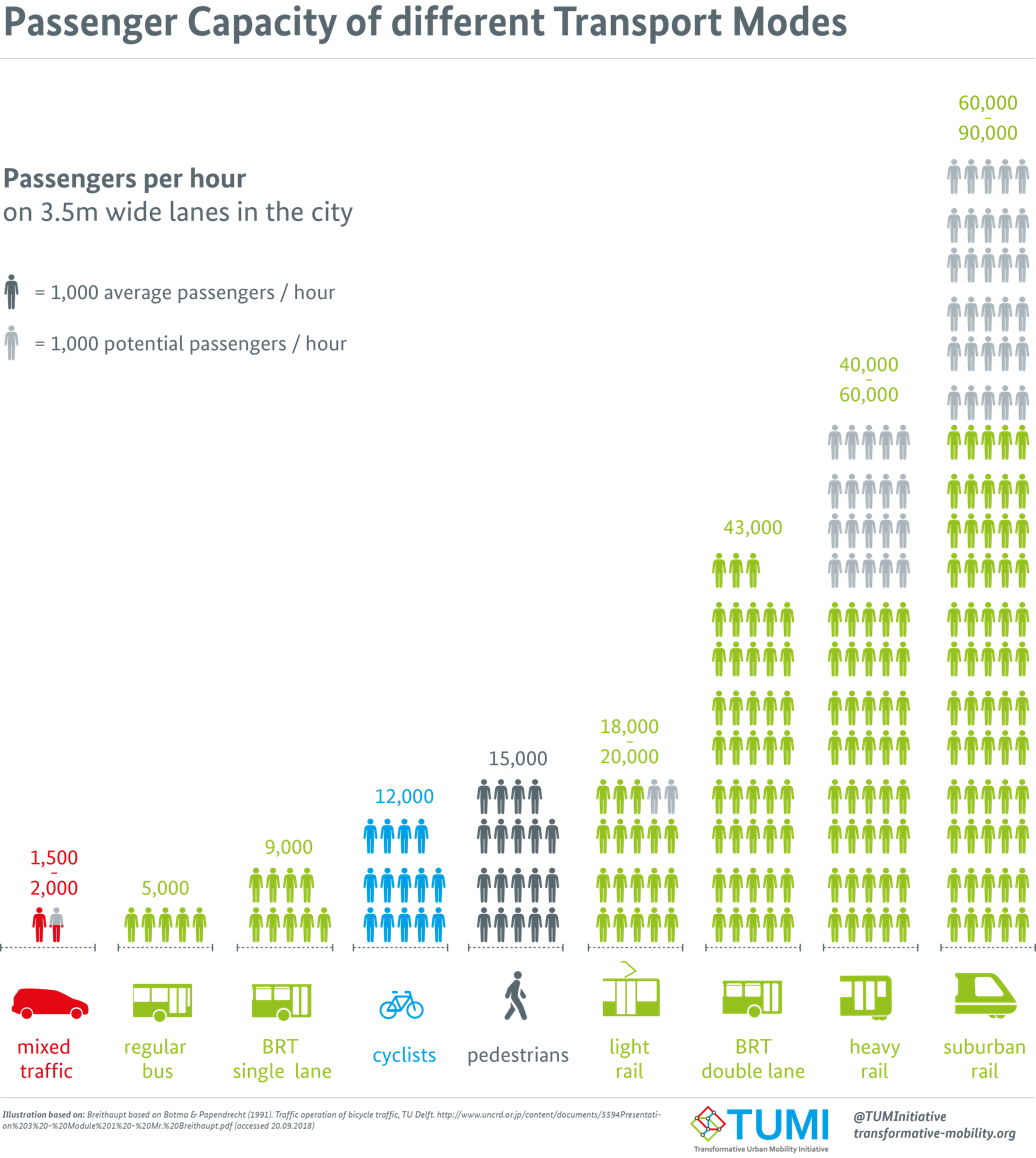
Passenger capacity of different transport modes

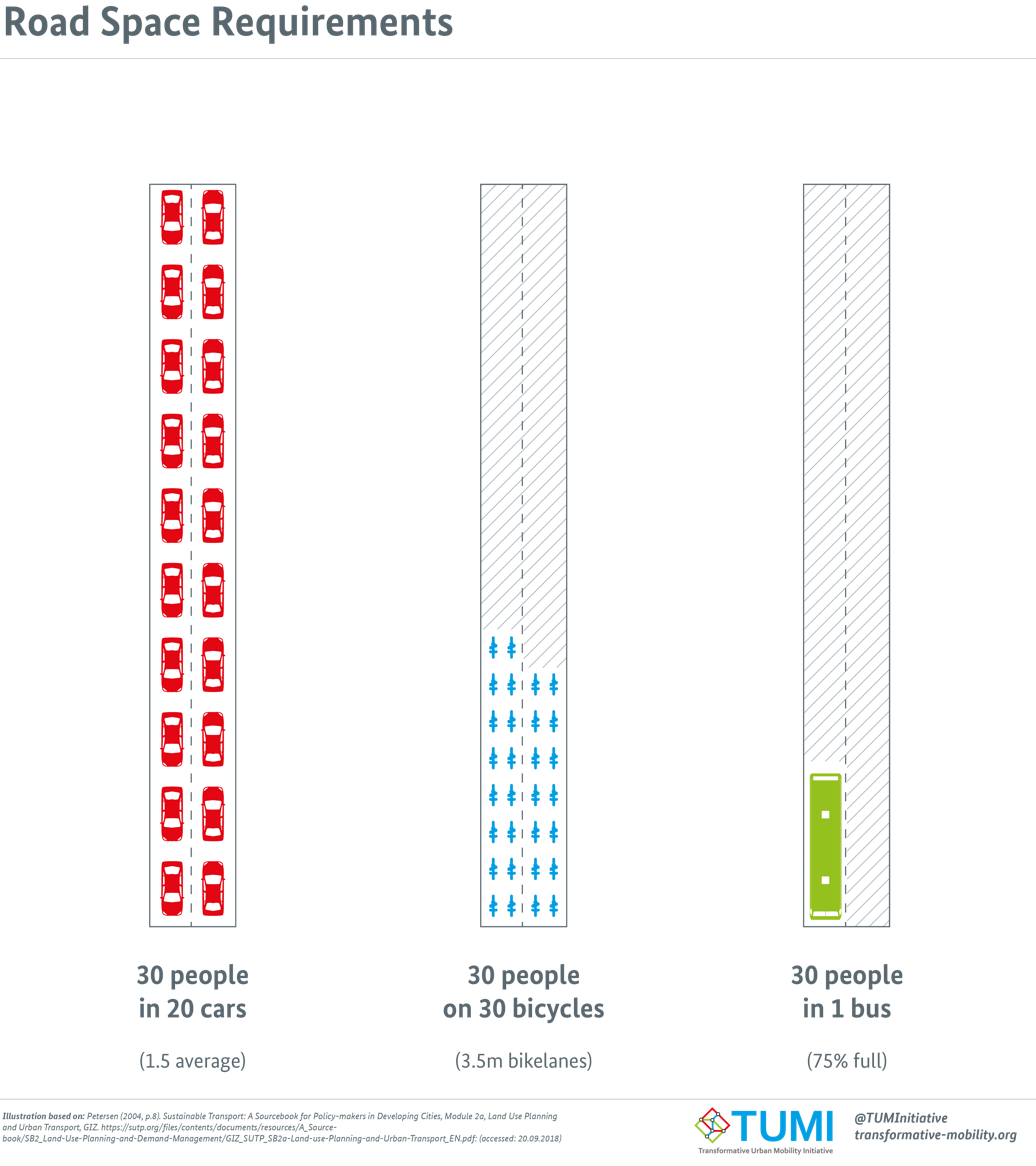
Road space requirements for different vehicle types

Proponents of the car-free movement focus on both sustainable and public transport (bus, tram, etc.) options and on urban design, zoning, school placement policies, urban agriculture, remote work options, and housing developments that create proximity or access so that long-distance transportation becomes less of a requirement of daily life.

New urbanism is an American urban design movement that arose in the early 1980s. Its goal has been to reform all aspects of real estate development and urban planning, from urban retrofits to suburban infill. New urbanist neighborhoods are designed to contain a diverse range of housing and jobs, and to be walkable. Other, more auto-oriented cities are also making incremental changes to provide transportation alternatives through Complete streets improvements.

World Squares for all is a scheme to remove much of the traffic from major squares in London, including Trafalgar Square and Parliament Square.

Car-free cities are, as the name implies, entire cities (or at least the inner parts thereof) which have been made entirely car-free.

Car-free zones are areas of a city or town where the use of cars is prohibited or greatly restricted.

To make the car-free zones/cities, (movable and/or stationary) bollards and other barriers are often used to deny car access.

Living streets and complete streets prioritize the needs of users of the street as a whole over those of car drivers. They are designed to be shared by pedestrians, playing children, bicyclists, and low-speed motor vehicles.

The ring road around Amsterdam (shown in red). At exits of ring roads such as this, distribution centers can be set up.

Distribution centers allow easy restocking of supermarkets, outlet stores, restaurants, and more in city centers. They rely on tractor units to unload their cargo in the suburban distribution center. The products are then placed in a small truck (sometimes electrically powered), cargo bike, or other vehicle to bridge the last mile to the destination in the city center. Besides offering advantages to the population (increased safety due to truck drivers having less blind spots, reduced noise pollution and traffic, reduced tailpipe emissions and reduced air pollution, and more), it also offers financial advantage for the companies, as tractor units require a lot of time to bridge this last mile (they lack agility and consume much fuel in congested streets).

The method above however still does not reduce car use inside non-car-free city centers (customers often use cars to fetch their groceries or appliances from city stores, since they have so much storage space). This problem is solved by means of online food ordering systems, which allow customers to order online, and then have it delivered to their doorstep by the supermarket or store itself, through bicycle couriers (using cargo bikes), electric delivery robots and delivery vans. Delivery vans allow to take along more cargo and deliver to several customers on a same trip. These food ordering systems could provide for a smooth transition for those cities that wish to become car-free as it can reduce both personal car use and personal car demand in cities.

At the outskirts of towns, between the exits of the rings roads, and the car-free zones in the city center themselves, additional car parking lots can be added, generally in the form of underground car parks (to avoid it taking up surface space). Careful placement of these car-parking lots is needed though, ensuring that they are made far enough from the city centers (and closer to the ring roads) to avoid them attracting more cars to the city center. In some instances, near these car parking lots, Park and ride public transport (i.e. bus) stops are foreseen, or bicycle-sharing systems are present.

Community bicycle programs provide bicycles within an urban environment for short term use. The first successful scheme was in the 1960s in Amsterdam and can now be found in many other cities with 20,000 bicycles introduced to Paris in 2007 in the Vélib' scheme. Dockless bike share systems have recently appeared in the United States and provide more convenience for people wanting to rent a bike for a short time period. There has been controversy surrounding bicycle lanes impacts on lanes for traffic.

== Advocacy and activism groups ==
Much of the modern organizing around the world for the reclaiming of the streets by pedestrians/cyclists has been community-led instead of government-led.

=== United Kingdom ===
The Campaign for Better Transport (formerly known as Transport2000) was formed in 1972 in Britain to challenge proposed cuts in the British rail network and since then has promoted public transport.

Car Free Walks is a UK-based website encouraging walkers to use public transport to reach the start and end of walks, rather than using a car.

Road protests in the United Kingdom rose to prominence in the early 1990s in response to a major road building program both in urban communities and also rural areas.

Reclaim the Streets, a movement formed in 1991 in London, "invaded" major roads, highway or freeway to stage parties. While this may obstruct the regular users of these spaces such as car drivers and public bus riders, the philosophy of RTS is that it is vehicle traffic, not pedestrians, who are causing the obstruction, and that by occupying the road they are in fact opening up public space.

=== Belgium ===
In Flanders, the organization Fietsersbond has called upon the government to ban tractor units in city centers.

=== United States ===
In the 1940s and 1950s, anti-car protests began occurring in numerous American cities and suburbs. The protesters, the vast majority of them women, demanded safer streets for pedestrians and children. These protests had become common by the 1950s and continued through the 1960s.

After a coal truck killed two 10-year-old girls on a play street in East Harlem, New York City in February 1949, mothers blocked the street at two points.

Women carried signs and picketed on streets and at intersections, sometimes bringing folding chairs and sitting across the breadth of streets. Children often accompanied their mothers to these events. Baby carriages, both occupied and unoccupied, were common sights at the protests and associated the demonstrations with motherhood and child safety. This practice became so common that news at the time dubbed them "baby carriage blockades."

In 1961, Jane Jacobs wrote her seminal critique of 1950s urban planning policy, The Death and Life of Great American Cities, which she holds responsible for the decline of many city neighborhoods. She speaks of the importance of planning for pedestrian use.

As Peter Norton of the University of Virginia explained in Bloomberg News, "The decline coincided with suburbanization, a falling birthrate, and smaller families, but it also signaled the ascendency of the now-preferred path to child traffic safety: the two-car family, parental chauffeuring of children, a surrender to car dependency regardless of the costs or family income, and the abandonment of children’s independent mobility. Where streets were unsafe for children, the problem became the mother’s responsibility, and an injury or a death was the mother’s fault."

The protests remained local to where they started and were not connected to a national movement. As white flight to the suburbs increased, these movements slowly died out. Despite this, walking remained important to people with fewer opportunities to drive: the poor, people of color, women, the disabled, and children. In the 1970 United States Census, 5% of employed Americans walked to work, though the rate in cities was higher.

A modern resurgence has been occurring in the past few decades. Critical Mass rides emerged in 1992 in San Francisco where cyclists take to the streets en masse to dominate the traffic, using the slogan "we are traffic." The ride was founded with the idea of drawing attention to how unfriendly the city was to bicyclists. The movement has grown to include events in major metropolitan cities around the world.

Parking Days started in 2005 when REBAR, a collaborative group of creators, designers and activists based in San Francisco, transformed a metered parking spot into a small park complete with turf, seating, and shade and by 2007 there were 180 parks in 27 cities around the world.

=== Spain ===
The World Naked Bike Ride was born in 2001 in Spain with the first naked bike rides, which then emerged as the WNBR in 2004 a concept which rapidly spread through collaborations with many different activist groups and individuals around the world to promote bicycle transportation, renewable energy, recreation, walkable communities, and environmentally responsible, sustainable living.

=== Netherlands ===
Prior to the 1970s, Dutch cities looked very similar to American cities in that they were designed for cars. Traffic deaths in the Netherlands rose steadily since the 1950s, peaking at 3,267 in 1972.

In 1972, the 6-year-old daughter of a journalist was killed by a car while biking to school in the Netherlands and the "Stop de Kindermoord" (Stop the Child Killing) protests began.

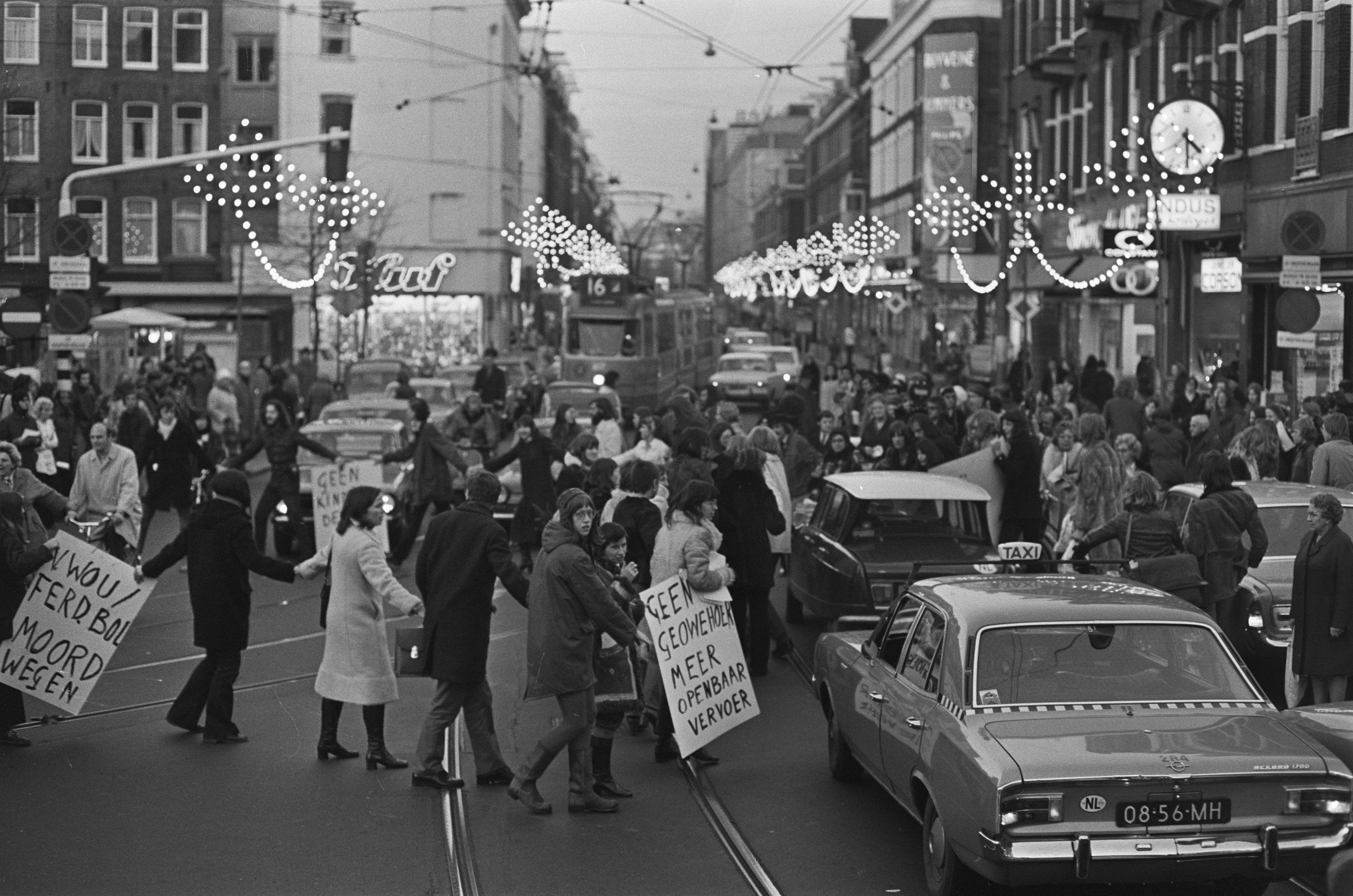
Stop de kindermoord protestors block the Albert Cuypstraat in Amsterdam in 1972.

The protests became popular across the country, and over time the roads became more bike and pedestrian friendly. Dutch road safety consistently improved, and by 2015 fatalities had decreased by 83% compared to 1972, with a record low of 570 in 2013 and 2014. In 2015 Dutch road fatalities increased for the first time since 1972.

More recently, a group self-identified as 'car free' to emancipate those who do not own a car. Under the name 'Ik Ben Autovrij' in reference to the 25% of Dutch households without a car, of which one quarter consciously chose to not own a car; 6% of all households according to research about car affordability.

=== International ===
r/fuckcars is an anti-car subreddit with 440,000 members as of July 2024.

== Organized events ==
Jakarta Car Free Day

Car-free days are official events with the common goal of taking a fair number of cars off the streets of a city or some target area or neighborhood for all or part of a day, in order to give the people who live and work there a chance to consider how their city might look and work with significantly fewer cars. The first events were organized in Reykjavík (Iceland), Bath (UK) and La Rochelle (France) in 1995. Jakarta, Indonesia is one such city that hosts weekly Car-Free days.

Ciclovía is a similar event in many cities that places a large emphasis on cycling as an alternative to auto travel. The event originated in Bogotá, Colombia in 1974. Now, Bogotá holds weekly ciclovías that turn the streets into giant car-free celebrations complete with stages set up in city parks with aerobics instructors, yoga teachers, and musicians leading people through various performances. The event has inspired similar celebrations globally.

In town, without my car! is an EU campaign and day every autumn (Northern Hemisphere) for an increased use of vehicles other than the car. It has since spread beyond the EU, and in 2004 more than 40 countries participated.

World Urbanism Day was founded in 1949 in Buenos Aires and is celebrated in more than 30 countries on four continents each November 8.

Towards Car-free Cities is the annual conference of the World Car-free Network and provides a focal point for diverse aspects of the emerging global car-free movement. The conference has been held in major cities around the world, including Portland, Oregon, United States in 2008 (its first time in North America), and has also been in Istanbul, Turkey; Bogota, Colombia; Budapest, Hungary; Berlin, Germany; Prague, Czech Republic; Timișoara, Romania; and Lyon, France. The conference series attempts to bridge the gap between many of the diverse people and organizations interested in reducing urban dependence on the automobile.

Transportation Alternatives' Annual Commuter Race pits a bicyclist against both a subway rider and a cab rider in a race from Queens to Manhattan. The Fifth Annual Commuter race took place in May 2009, where bicyclist Rachel Myers beat straphanger Dan Hendrick and cab rider Willie Thompson to make it the fifth year the contestant on the bicycle won. Myers took the 2009 title with a time of 20 minutes and 15 seconds to make the 4.2 mile trek from Sunnyside, Queens to Columbus Circle in Manhattan. Hendrick showed up 15 minutes later off the subway and Thompson arrived via cab nearly a half-hour after that. Transportation Alternatives is a group that "seeks to change New York City's transportation priorities to encourage and increase non-polluting, quiet, city-friendly travel and decrease—not ban—private car use. [They] seek a rational transportation system based on a 'Green Transportation Hierarchy,' which gives preference to modes of travel based on their benefits and costs to society. To achieve its goals, T.A. works in five areas: Bicycling, Walking and Traffic Calming, Car-Free Parks, Safe Streets and Sensible Transportation." The 2009 Commuter Race took place after a Times Square traffic ban in New York City that drew national media attention.

== Car-free development ==
Some governments have responded with policies and regulations aimed at reversing auto dependency by increasing urban densities, encouraging mixed use development and infill, reducing space allocated to private cars, increasing walkability, supporting cycling and other alternative vehicles similar in size and speed, and public transport. Globally, urban planning is evolving in an effort to increase public transport and non-motorized transport modal shares and shift away from private transport oriented development. Cities like Hong Kong developed a highly integrated public transportation system which effectively reduced the use of private transport. In contrast with private automotive travel, car sharing, where people can easily rent a car for a few hours rather than own one, is emerging as an increasingly important element for urban transportation.

=== Definitions and types ===
There are many areas of the world where people have always lived without cars, because no road access is possible, or none has been provided. In developed countries these include islands and some historic neighborhoods or settlements, the largest example being the canal city of Venice. The term carfree development implies a physical change – either new building or changes to an existing built area.

Melia et al. (2010) define car-free development as follows:

Car-free developments are residential or mixed use developments which:

- Normally provide a traffic-free immediate environment, and:
- Offer no parking or limited parking separated from the residence, and:
- Are designed to enable residents to live without owning a car.

This definition (which they distinguish from the more common "low car development") is based mainly on experience in Northwestern Europe, where the movement for car-free development began. Within this definition three types are identified:

- Vauban model
- Limited Access model
- Pedestrian zones with residential population

==== Vauban, Germany ====
Vauban, Freiburg, Germany is according to this definition, the largest car-free development in Europe, with over 5,000 residents. Whether it can be considered car-free is open to debate: many local people prefer the term "stellplatzfrei" – literally "free from parking spaces" to describe the traffic management system there. Vehicles are allowed down the residential streets at walking pace to pick up and deliver but not to park, although there are frequent infractions. Residents of the stellplatzfrei areas must sign an annual declaration stating whether they own a car or not. Car owners must purchase a place in one of the multi-storey car parks on the periphery, run by a council-owned company. The cost of these spaces – €17,500 in 2006, plus a monthly fee – acts as a disincentive to car ownership.

==== Limited access type ====
The more common form of car free development involves some sort of physical barrier, which prevents motor vehicles from penetrating into a car-free center. Melia et al. describe this as the "Limited Access" type. In some cases such as Stellwerk 60 in Cologne, there is a removable barrier, controlled by a residents' organizations. In others cases, such as in Waterwijk, vehicular access is only available from the exterior.

==== Pedestrian zones ====
Whereas the first two models apply to newly built car free developments, most pedestrianized areas have been retro-fitted. Pedestrian zones may be considered car-free developments where they include a significant population and a low rate of vehicle ownership per household. The largest example in Europe is Groningen, Netherlands which had a city centre population of 16,500 in 2008.

=== Benefits and problems ===
Reduction in one's carbon footprint for various actions

Several studies have been done on European car free developments. The most comprehensive was conducted in 2000 by Jan Scheurer. Other more recent studies have been made of specific car-free areas such as Vienna's Floridsdorf car-free development.

The main benefits found for car free developments (summarized in Melia et al. 2010) found in the various studies are:

- very low levels of car use, resulting in much less traffic on surrounding roads
- high rates of walking and cycling
- more independent movement and active play amongst children
- less land taken for parking and roads – more available for green or social space

The main problems are related to parking management – if parking is not controlled in the surrounding area, there are often complaints from neighbors about overspill parking.

== See also ==
- Alternatives to car use
- Automobile dependency
- Car costs
- Carfree city
- Car-Free Days
- Circulation plan
- Effects of the car on societies
- Externalities of cars
- Free public transport
- Individual action on climate change
- Jane Jacobs
- Jan Gehl
- Donald Shoup
- List of car-free places
- Obesity and walking
- Peak car
- Principles of intelligent urbanism
- Right to mobility
- Road reallocation
- Street reclamation
- Transit-oriented development
- Urban planning
- Urban vitality
