= Unplug America =

Yearly tradition on October 13

The "Unplug America - Give Mother Earth a Rest Day" tradition was started in 1992 by Indigenous Peoples and is observed on October 13 each year. It is a day to live simply and off grid, enjoy the nature around you and breathe fresh air. Unplug your TV, computers... and take a walk. The campaign focuses primarily on America because of massively high per capita consumption in the US.

In the early 1990s, the UNPLUG from Mother Earth Campaign was initiated by three Indigenous-based organizations. These organizations and leaders were Tom B.K. Goldtooth, Indigenous Environmental Network (IEN); Winona LaDuke, Indigenous Women's Network (IWN)and Christopher Peters, 7th Generation Fund (SGF). Nilak Butler (deceased), member of IEN and IWN also assisted in the development of this UNPLUG Campaign during the 1990s in her capacity as an Indigenous staff organizer within the Indigenous Nuclear Free Campaign of U.S. Greenpeace. Periodically throughout the 1990s and 2000s the UNPLUG from Mother Earth Campaign was initiated by these organizations, expanding to include other organizations such as Honor The Earth and White Earth Land Recovery Project. There is no ownership of the concept of this campaign. It has been the principle of IEN, IWN and SGF for people of the United States, Canada, other industrialized countries and of the world to adopt this campaign.

== See also ==
- Earth Hour (Australia)
