= Car-free city =

Urban area absent of motor vehicles

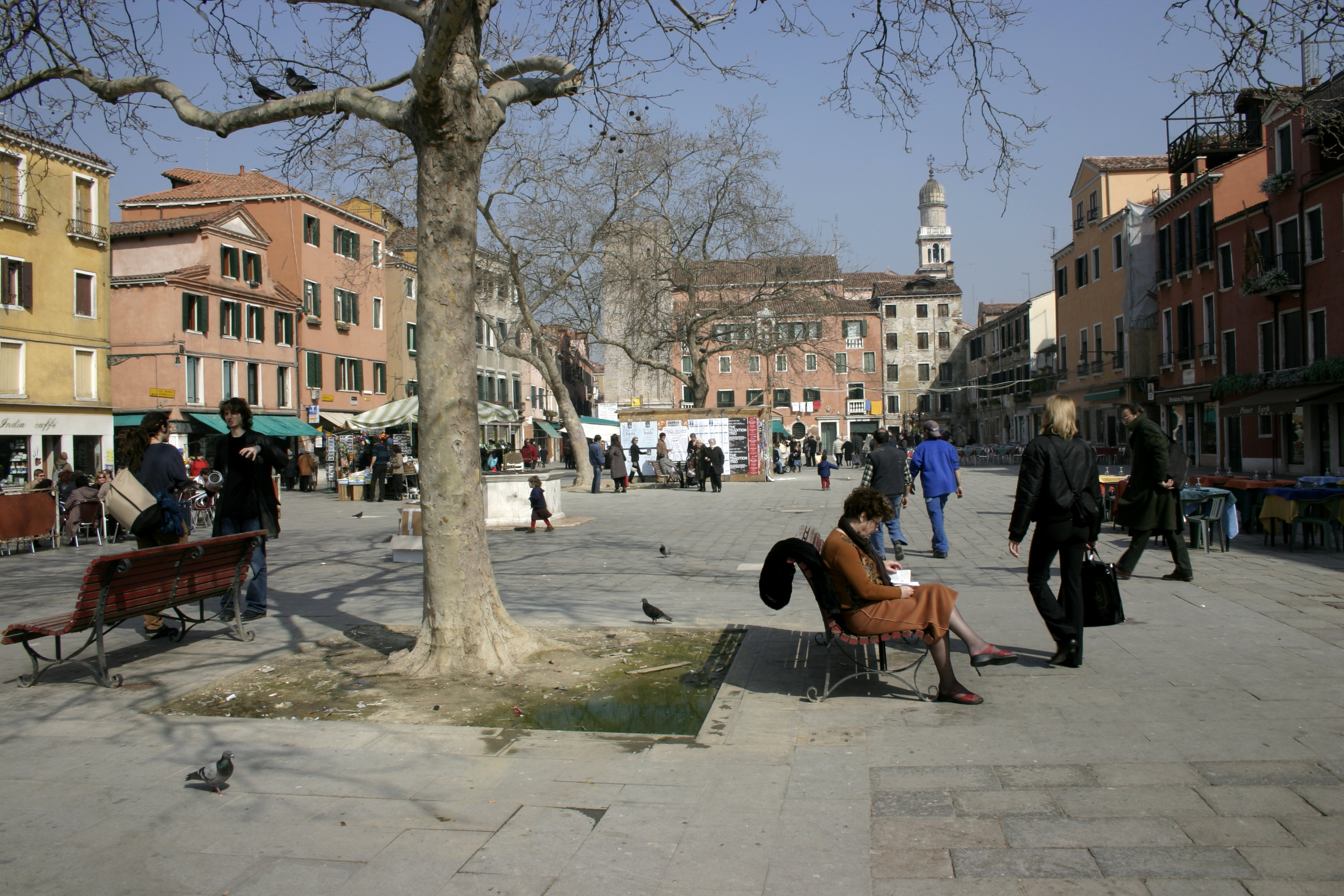
A square in Venice, an example of a car-free city

A car-free city is an urban area without motor vehicles. Car-free cities rely on public transport, walking, and cycling for travel, as opposed to private motor vehicles. The term "car-free zone" is applied to districts where motor vehicles are prohibited. The concept of the car-free city model gained traction in the second half of the 20th century due to congestion and infrastructure issues, as well as the proposed environmental and quality of life benefits. Many cities in Asia, Europe, and Africa have car-free areas because they were created before the invention of motor vehicles, In addition, many developing cities in Asia are adopting the car-free model to modernize their infrastructure.

== Characteristics ==
A city can be fully or partly car-free. Cities that are fully car-free prohibit all use of private cars in the city limits, while cities that are partly car-free have car-free zones but allow some private car use in other areas. These zones tend to be focused around the city center. Car-free city projects are designed around the needs of people rather than cars, with careful zoning that increases pedestrian mobility and efficient structural placement.

While there is no specific blueprint for designing a car-free city, many cities around the world have found success with variants of the following model.

An idyllic car-free city consists of two zones: a residential core and service-based periphery. The core consists of residences and living quarters within a public space in the center. In order to reduce motor traffic in this area, walking serves as the primary mode of transportation with cycling routes open as an addition. As a result, there is less conflict between motorized traffic and residences. A pedestrian and bicycle network also gradually emerges, joining several parts of the city.

The periphery, which encapsulates the residential core, is composed of services and facilities such as supermarkets and gyms. The distances between these facilities and the core are determined by the frequency of usage, with the more frequently used lying closest to the city center. These facilities will be decentralized around the city, with the goal to reduce walking distances, improve residential access, and minimize the need for new road infrastructure. An alternative to a decentralized configuration is a central public transport stop surrounded by dense shops and services that provide for easy public access without walking.

Outside the car-free city lie transportation zones and car parks to be used by the city residences. Car parks outside the city square provide access to the periphery of the city, but bar access to the core. Often, parkings are created at the outskirts of the city to allow people to park their car there, and/or take an alternative means of transport into town ("park and ride"). These networks allow for logistical components such as centralized import/export and waste collection.

== Motivations ==
Motivations for the transition to (or creation of) a car-free city include a reduction in air pollution and noise pollution, as well as the ability to reallocate land previously used for vehicle infrastructure such as parking lots and wide roads. Particularly in developing countries, the current infrastructures are not able to keep up with the increase of private vehicles, even after optimization and new construction of roadways.

Regarding the environmental impacts, reducing the number of cars concentrated in an urban area can improve air quality and reduce noise. It is believed that vehicular pollution causes approximately 184,000 deaths around the world, and keeping cars out of heavily populated areas could reduce the impact of this pollution. Additionally, future plans of implementing superblocks in Barcelona could reduce the amount of the residential population exposed to noise pollution greater than 65 dB from 42.5% to 26.5%.

Regarding the ability to reallocate land, around 70% of downtown land in several U.S. cities is allocated for use by cars. The removal of parking lots and other car-heavy areas not only alleviates the air and noise pollution but provides the opportunity for land to be used for other purposes. If land is reallocated properly, it could also reduce the urban heat island effect, which occurs when concrete and asphalt replace greenery in an area, resulting in increased temperatures due to albedo and other effects. In developing countries such as Vietnam, efforts to curb traffic through optimization of roadways, building of new infrastructure, and change in policies have not been able to alleviate motorized flow. There is traction to introduce a new car-free city model that would allow for improving the quality of life while meeting the logistical needs of all residents.

== Process ==
Current efforts to transform congested cities into car-free cities requires a few logistical and societal measures such as consultation meetings with all stakeholders, such as town halls, using computer modelling and measuring traffic before and after road closures, and enforcing restrictions once the plan is in place. Many cities undergoing transformation in the EU have outlined their guidelines from pre-implementation consultation, to design, to post implementation.

After the closing down of streets and squares to personal car traffic, a pedestrian and bicycle network gradually emerges and joins several parts of the city. Similarly, prompted by the same need to avoid conflicts with car traffic and enhance pedestrian movement, pedestrian networks have emerged below street level (underground city) or above road-level to connect large downtown areas as in the Minneapolis Skyway System. For new areas on the fringe of cities or new towns, two new complementary ideas have emerged. The concept of Filtered Permeability (2007) and a model for planning towns and subdivisions - the Fused Grid (2003). Both focus on shifting the balance of network design in favor of pedestrian and bicycle mobility.

== Impacts ==
Direct impacts of car-free urban designs include enhanced air quality due to elimination of the pollutants that result from combustive processes used in many motor vehicles, reduced noise pollution and ground vibrations associated with engine and vehicle use, and reduced urban heat island effect. Another impact would be the reduction of automobile-involved pedestrian and cyclist collisions and fatalities. Indirectly, through efficient, sustainable use of resources and faster transport of goods and people, car-free cities aim to improve quality of life for residents.

=== Environmental ===
Environmental impacts include a reduction in emissions of greenhouse gases as well as improvements in noise levels. After limiting the access of cars to the city center in Madrid, nitrogen oxide levels fell by 38% and carbon dioxide fell by 14.2% in the city center. These emissions also fell across the whole city of Madrid by 9% for nitrogen oxide and 2% for carbon dioxide. Additionally, levels of ambient noise that are associated with vehicular traffic can be reduced by implementing car-free zones, as seen by the reduction in noise pollution of 10 dB that occurs in Brussels on car-free Sundays.

=== Economic ===
Residents of car-free areas are able to benefit from an increase in green space and an improved economy. In Madrid, limiting the access of cars to the city center resulted in increasing consumer spending by 9.5% on the main shopping street and by 3.3% across all of Madrid. Additionally, residents of car-free zones in the Netherlands have benefited from increased real estate values, however, the neighboring non-car-free zones have had to deal with the spillover due to cars being unable to park in the car-free areas. This brings into prominence the necessity of adequate parking near these zones and the question of whether these zones are inequitable. Also, car-free designs limit transport options. Cities vary in their degree of automobile dependency, and urban structure tends to follow a concentric zone model. Thus, people living in suburbs and exurbs might gain little benefit and lose convenient access to the inner city, in redevelopment schemes for central and wealthy residential areas.

=== Individual ===
The individual impacts relate to the revitalisation of the space encouraging people to be more physically active, whether that be for commuting, for exercise or for leisure. By decreasing urban sprawl, mental health implications are perceived to improve due to less social and aesthetic issues caused by the segregation and isolation in car dependent societies.

== Examples ==
=== Venice ===
The city of Venice serves as an example of how a modern city can function without cars. This design was unintentional as the city was founded over 1,500 years ago, long before the invention of the automobile. Visitors who drive to the city or residents who own a car must park their car in a carpark outside of the city and then proceed either by foot or train into the city. The predominant method of transportation in the city is by foot, however motorized waterbuses (vaporetti) which travel the city's canals are also available.

=== Barcelona ===
As part of the city council's 2014 Urban Mobility Plan, Barcelona, Spain, has implemented nine city block wide pedestrian-only spaces, known as "superblocks". The perimeters of these blocks remain open to all cars and city buses, while the interior only allows local traffic that must travel under 10 km/h (6 mph). The city's government cites several aims for this plan, including more sustainable mobility and a revitalization of public spaces. The COVID-19 pandemic gave birth to proposals for radical change in the organization of Barcelona, such as the Manifesto for the Reorganisation of the City after COVID-19, published in Barcelona by architecture theorist Massimo Paolini and signed by 160 academics and 300 architects, with the elimination of the car as a key element. The manifesto proposed pedestrianization of the whole city, prioritizing bicycle transport and efficient public transportation. The concept of a living street was a vital part of the manifesto. Reduction of vehicle traffic during the pandemic positively impacted the environment as air and noise pollution significantly decreased. Residents put emphasis on the idea of a living street as it would introduce more nature into the city. Living streets in Barcelona create opportunities for children to have a safe environment to play. COVID-19 increased the desire for areas dedicated to urban green spaces, as these areas became places of refuge during the pandemic. The re-naturalization of the city is now held to a higher standard as it guarantees an increase in human health and wellbeing. The manifesto inspired other Spanish cities to publish their own version adapted to the local context: Granada, Zaragoza, Guadalajara, the Basque Country and the initiative Ciudades Sostenibles.

=== Nuremberg ===
Since the 1970s, Nuremberg, Germany, has closed major vehicular traffic corridors in phases, amounting to a largely car-free city center. In 1988, the city closed the last vehicular through-way through the center of the city on a trial basis. Within a year, this transformation reduced overall vehicular traffic flow by 25% and increased air quality significantly. The removal of cars from the city center was accompanied with the renovation of buildings and installation of new art pieces, producing an appealing pedestrian precinct.

=== Heidelberg ===
As of 2021, the city of Heidelberg, Germany, according to the New York Times, "is buying a fleet of hydrogen-powered buses, building a network of bicycle 'superhighways' to the suburbs and designing neighborhoods to discourage all vehicles and encourage walking." An incentive of one year of free public transportation is given to any car owner who gives up their car.

=== Ghent ===
In Ghent, Belgium, a circulation plan has been initiated and now the entire city heart (35 hectares; 86 acres) is partially car-free. Sections exist where cars can drive as well as sections that are car-free. In some sections, public transport, taxis and permit holders may enter but they may not exceed 20 km/h (10 mph). A parking route exists around the city center, employing a parking guidance system to ensure access to all parts of the city and underground parking garages. The transition to car-free has significantly reduced traffic congestion and increased the use of other modes of transport, such as bikes and public transportation.

=== Islands ===
Other examples of car-free places are Mackinac Island and Paquetá Island, where cars are banned and the main transportation is by means of horses, bicycles, and boats.

=== Future Aspirations ===
==== Masdar City ====
Masdar City, United Arab Emirates, is a futuristic city designed with eco-friendly principles in mind. Masdar City adopted a car-free philosophy as part of its fundamental basis of being an eco-city. Personal cars are eliminated from the street spaces, in favour of a walkable city design, and use of its autonomous personal rapid transit network for public transportation over greater distances.

==== Great City ====
The Great City, in China, is another example of a newly-developed city, designed with the fundamentals of a car-free city in mind.

== See also ==
General

- Ban on on-street parking
- Car-free days
- Car-free movement
- Cyclability
- Cycling infrastructure
- Effects of the car on societies
- Freeway removal
- Jan Gehl
- Induced demand
- In town, without my car!
- List of car-free places
- Mobility transition
- Road diet – Transportation planning technique
- Street reclamation
- Urban vitality
- Walking audit

Other modes

- Automotive city – Urban planning prioritising automobiles
- Bicycle-friendly – Urban planning prioritising cycling
- Green transport hierarchy – Prioritising vulnerable sustainable road users
- Modal shift – Share of mode of transport
- Pedestrian village – Urban planning for mixed-use areas prioritising pedestrians
- Pedestrian zone – Urban car-free area reserved for pedestrian use
- Permeability (spatial and transport planning) – Freedom of movement of traffic
- Smart city – City using integrated information and communication technology
- Sustainable transport – Transport with sustainable social and environmental impacts
- Transit mall – Urban street reserved for public transit, bicycles, and pedestrians
