= In town, without my car! =

- Observed by: Europe
- Type: environmental
- Significance: Bring attention to more environmental-friendly vehicles
- Celebrations: Campaigns
- Date: Autumn (Northern Hemisphere)
- Frequency: annual
- First time: September 1998; 26 years ago
- Related to: EU

In town, without my car! (ITWMC) is an EU campaign and day every autumn since 1998 for a decreased use of cars and an increased use of other modes of transport. It has since spread beyond the EU, and in 2007 over 2,000 towns and cities in 35 countries participated. In 2008 it was active in 2,102 municipalities in 39 countries.

The main idea behind this campaign is to encourage the use of alternative forms of transport and travel and to raise awareness within the community of what is at stake with regards to long term mobility in towns and the risks connected with pollution. The campaign is co-ordinated by the Directorate-General for the Environment (DG Environment) of the European Commission. As such, it aims to contribute to improving the health and quality of life of European citizens. 203 million participated in the 2006 campaign.

The group wishes to challenge car-centric culture: "The car is far more than just a means of getting about, it is a status symbol and the use of the car is deeply ingrained in many cultures. Reversing this will take time and it will require a sustained information and awareness campaign to open people's hearts and minds to the possibility of change."

== See also ==
- Car-Free Days
