= Bay Area Bike to Work Day =

- Frequency: Annual
- Location: San Francisco Bay Area
- Years active: 32
- Inaugurated: May 16, 1994
- Previous event: May 15, 2025
- Next event: May 14, 2026
- Participants: Alameda County, Contra Costa County, Marin County, Napa County, San Francisco, San Mateo County, Santa Clara County, Solano County, Sonoma County
- Major events: Bicycle commuting
- Website: bayareabiketowork.com

Bay Area Bike to Work Day is an annual Bike-to-Work Day event held in the San Francisco Bay Area of the United States, encouraging and promoting bicycle commuting. The event is an initiative of the Metropolitan Transportation Commission, and supported by local partners including the San Francisco Bicycle Coalition, Bike East Bay, Silicon Valley Bicycle Coalition, Marin County Bicycle Coalition, Napa County Bicycle Coalition, and Sonoma County Bicycle Coalition. Up through 2019, the Bay Area celebration was a week earlier than the national US Bike to Work Day. After limited events in 2020-2021 due to the COVID-19 pandemic, the date for 2022 onward was changed to the third Friday of May, to match the nationwide practice.

In 2018, nearly 100,000 people participated. In 2019, the event was held on May 9.

== Activities ==
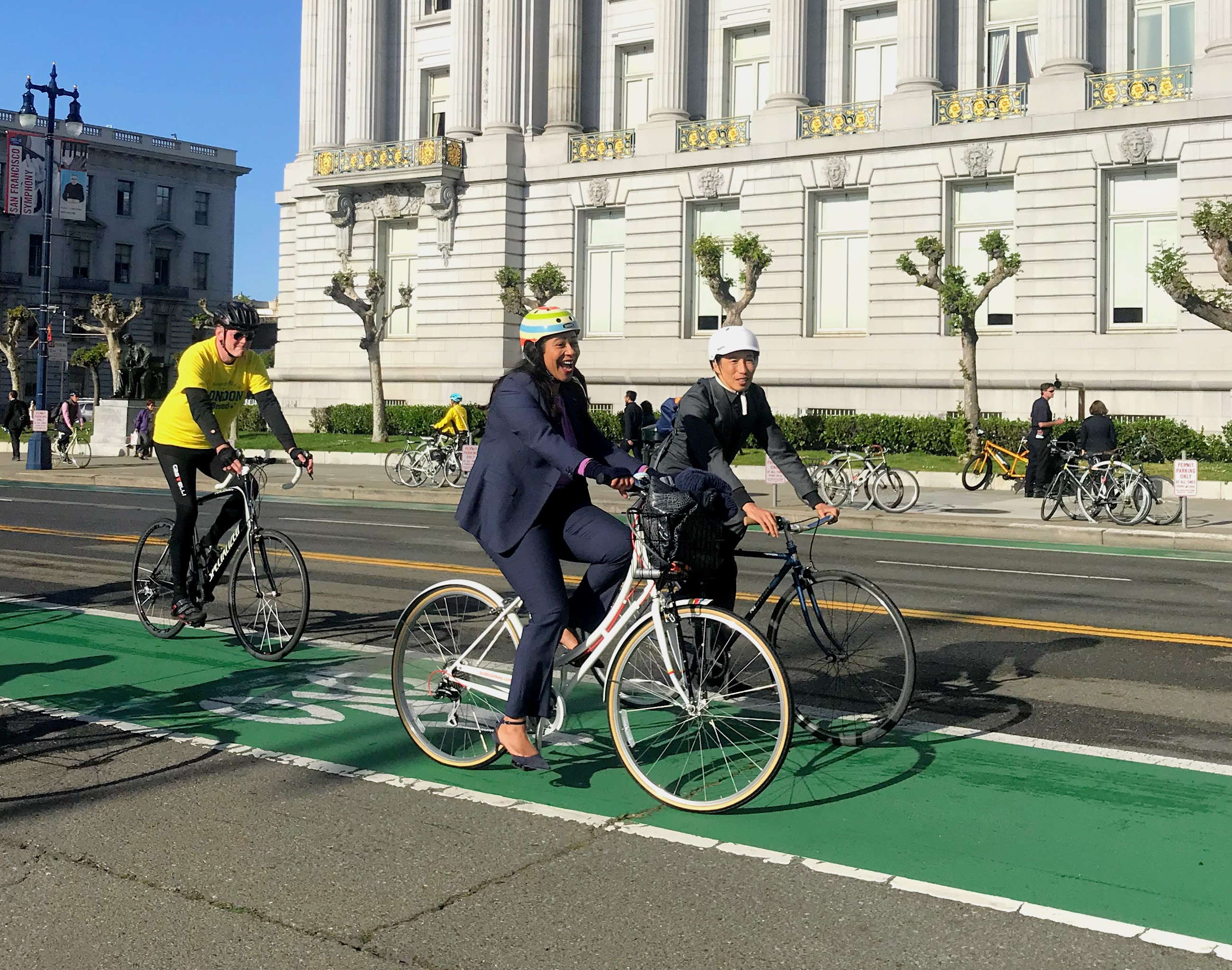
London Breed at San Francisco City Hall on Bike-to-Work Day in 2018

A wide variety of bicycle-related events are organized throughout the Bay Area including "Neighborhood Rides" and "Energizer Stations" providing free food and coffee to bicycle commuters. The Mayor of San Francisco and members of the San Francisco Board of Supervisors regularly participate, commuting by bicycle to City Hall for a rally. The day celebrates bicycle infrastructure improvements across the region, such as the installation of new protected bicycle lanes, and is an important advocacy day for future street redesigns which aim to increase bicycle safety.

== See also ==
- Bike-to-Work Day
- Bike safety
- Cycling infrastructure
- Walk to Work Day
