= Pedestrian Day =

Awareness day about the Pedestrians

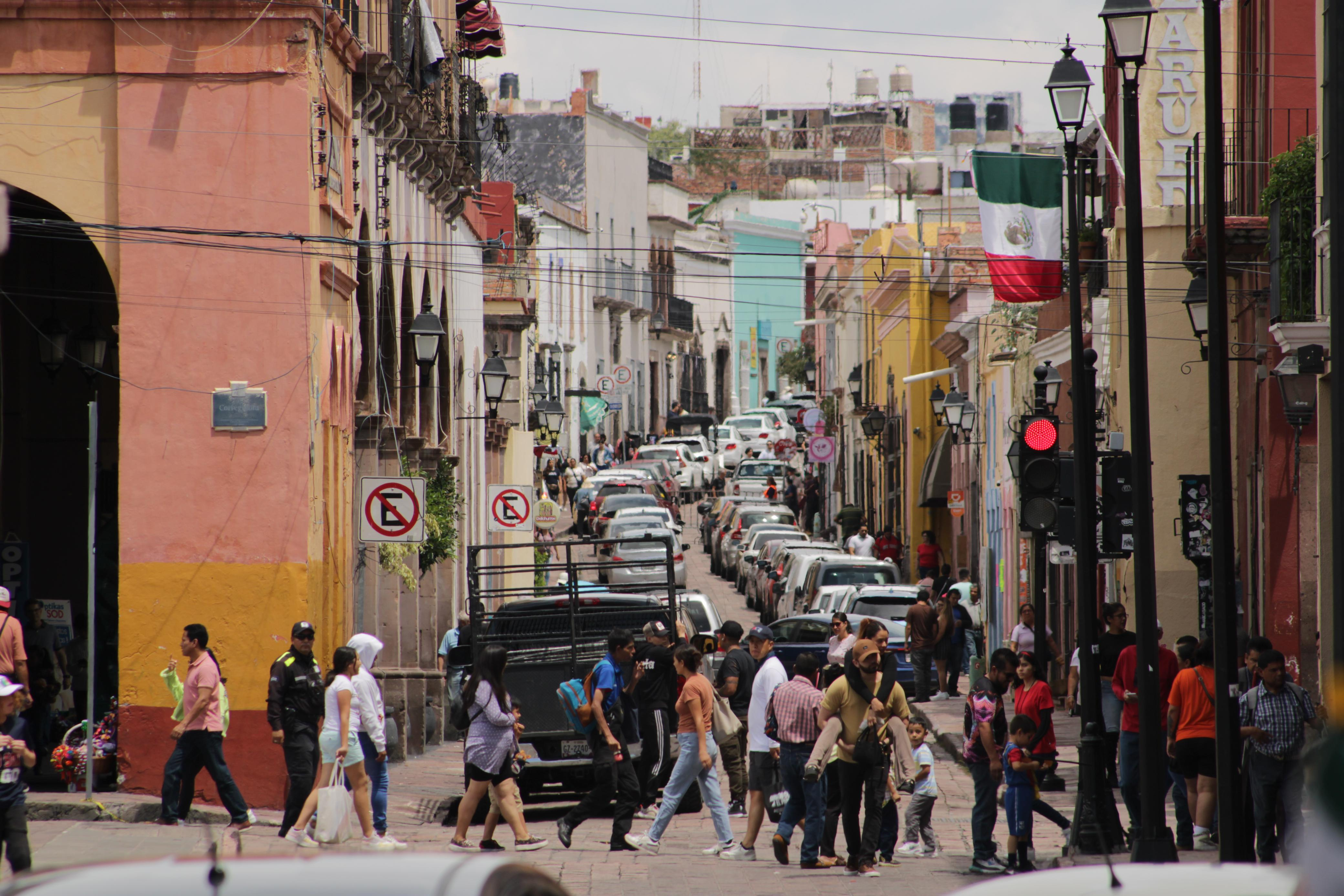
Pedestrians in Querétaro, Mexico

A Pedestrian Day is a day that focuses on the safety, rights, welfare and challenges of pedestrians over other road users in the reverse traffic pyramid. This includes creating safer and more accessible urban environments for pedestrians. Walking is a form of sustainable transport that reduces environmental impact, and increasing walkability also promotes equity and social justice by facilitating mobility for all people, regardless of socioeconomic status.

Walking is the natural way for humans to move, yet pedestrians are the most vulnerable and at-risk road users. According to the World Health Organization, pedestrians account for 22% of all road traffic deaths worldwide. Most are killed by car drivers, and it has been described as a global health crisis.

== Dates ==
Pedestrian days are held on various dates.

In Spain, the Association of the Prevention of Traffic Accidents (P(A)T) states that World Pedestrian Day is held annually on 17 August from 2024. The date originates from London, England, 17 August 1897, when a woman named Bridget Driscoll was killed by a car driver, which is considered the first recorded road traffic fatality in the world. The coroner stated at the time that he hoped something like this would never happen again, but in 2010 it was estimated that 550,000 people had been killed on the roads of the United Kingdom.

Indonesia's National Pedestrian Day (Hari Pejalan Kaki Nasional) has been observed on 22 January every year since 2013 in memory of an incident on 22 January 2012 at the Tugu Tani Bus Stop in Jakarta in which 13 pedestrians were hit and 9 of them killed by a car driver.

Bhutan in 2011 introduced every Tuesday as a pedestrian day, which resulted in carfree city centers.

== Road safety ==
Every year, more than 1.3 million people lose their lives in traffic accidents, and between 20 and 50 million are injured, many of which result in disability. Young people between the ages of 5 and 29 are particularly vulnerable, and traffic fatalities are one of the leading causes of death in this age group.

In the United States, pedestrian fatalities have been steadily increasing since 2010, and 2023 had the highest number of fatalities since 1981, with an average of 20 people killed by motorists each day. Causes cited include the increase in tall SUVs, which are more deadly than small cars, and unsafe pedestrian infrastructure.

== See also ==
- Reverse traffic pyramid or mobility pyramid, a principle which prioritizes vulnerable and sustainable transport
- Motorist day, car-related observance celebrating the institution of driving
- Sidewalk cycling, a place where pedestrians usually have priority
- World Bicycle Day, international day to celebrate the bicycle as a sustainable means of transport
