= San Francisco Bicycle Plan =

Overview of San Francisco bicycle plan

The San Francisco Bicycle Plan is the current guiding document for near-term bicycle transportation improvements in San Francisco, and was adopted unanimously by the Board of Supervisors on August 11, 2009. The overall goal of the plan is to "increase safe bicycle use" over an expected implementation timeline of 5 years. The plan recommends 60 near-term improvements to the bicycle route network, 52 of which are the addition of bicycle lanes to 34 miles of city streets to the already existing 45 miles of city streets with bicycle lanes.

== History ==
San Francisco adopted a "Transit First" policy in 1973, identifying transit, bicyclists, and pedestrians as the city's top transportation priorities. It states that "Travel by public transit, by bicycle, and on foot must be an attractive alternative to travel by private automobile", "Decisions regarding the use of limited public street and sidewalk space shall encourage the use of public rights of way by pedestrians, bicyclists, and public transit", and "Bicycling shall be promoted by encouraging safe streets for riding, convenient access to transit, bicycle lanes, and secure bicycle parking." In order to more specifically guide improvements to bicycle infrastructure, the first San Francisco Bicycle Plan was adopted in 1997, and led to the construction of many bicycle lanes and the installation of over 1,500 bicycle parking racks on sidewalks.

An effort to update the 1997 plan was initiated in 2002 in order to qualify for funding from the California Bicycle Transportation Account (BTA) for bicycle facilities and programs. Public outreach to provide community input was led by the San Francisco Bicycle Coalition, and funded by a Caltrans Community Based Planning Grant. This community input included thousands of individuals and community groups in the planning process. The resulting 2005 San Francisco Bicycle Plan was adopted unanimously by the Board of Supervisors on June 7, 2005, but a preliminary injunction was issued against its implementation by San Francisco Superior Court judge James Warren at the request of plan opponents in late June 2006. These groups argued that removing travel lanes and parking spaces for motor vehicles, as the bicycle plan proposed, could cause significant damage to the environment and therefore required an environmental review under the California Environmental Quality Act. The injunction, which was upheld by San Francisco Superior Court judge Peter Busch on November 7, 2006, barred the city from implementing any of the projects described in the plan, including bicycle paths, lanes, or sharrows.

== Goals ==
The 2009 San Francisco Bicycle Plan's overall goal is to "increase safe bicycle use". In addition, the plan has eight "chapter goals" intended to support the overall goal with specific action items.

Chapter	Chapter Title	Chapter Goal
1	Bicycle Route Network	Refine and expand the existing bicycle route network
2	Bicycle Parking	Ensure plentiful, high-quality bicycle parking
3	Transit and Bridge Access	Expand bicycle access to transit and bridges
4	Education	Educate the public about bicycle safety
5	Enforcement and Safety	Improve bicycle safety through targeted enforcement
6	Promotion	Promote and encourage safe bicycling
7	Citywide Coordination	Adopt bicycle-friendly practices and policies
8	Bicycle Funding	Prioritize and increase bicycle funding

== Implementation ==
=== Route network ===
The San Francisco Municipal Transportation Agency (SFMTA) and the San Francisco Department of Public Works (SFDPW) are responsible for implementing improvements to the bicycle route network. The SFMTA pursues bicycle project funding, and serves as the lead planning and engineering agency for bicycle projects, while the SFDPW contracts the construction of bicycle projects. Six months later, at the end of January 2011, they had installed bicycle lanes on 11 miles of city streets.

=== Parking ===
The SFMTA installs inverted-U bicycle parking racks at the request of businesses or residents on city sidewalks next to the street. This activity was not prevented under the 2006-2010 injunction, and the SFMTA continues to install and repair them when damaged, slowly increasing their number over time. Between August and December 2010, the SFMTA installed ten "bicycle corrals", which are groups of five to eight inverted-U racks located in the street next to the sidewalk, replacing one automobile parking space. These were installed at locations with a particularly high demand for bicycle parking, usually grocery stores or cafes.

=== Transit and bridge access ===
While the 2005 San Francisco Bicycle Plan was under injunction, the commuter rail service Caltrain, which runs daily between San Francisco and San Jose, issued a Bicycle Access and Parking Plan on October 2, 2008. This plan aims to increase cycling to Caltrain stations, already at 8% of riders, by expanding bicycle access to trains and with additional bicycle parking at stations. Caltrain first allowed bicycles on board in 1992 and has since made incremental improvements, most recently increasing bicycle capacity in 2009, from 32 to 40 bicycles on the older "gallery" train cars and from 16 to 24 bicycles on the newer Bombardier train cars.

BART permanently permitted bicycles on all trains at all hours as of October, 2013 with certain restrictions related to the front cars of the train and crowding. None of the other agencies that serve San Francisco with public transit (Muni, AC Transit, SamTrans) have improved bicycle access since the bicycle plan was adopted. Bicycle access is normally not a problem on AC Transit or SamTrans, as all of their buses are equipped with front-mounted bicycle racks.

Bicycles have been allowed on the Golden Gate Bridge since the mid-1970s, but until recently have never had access to the Bay Bridge. Cyclists now have access to the new eastern span of the Bay Bridge (between Yerba Buena Island and Oakland) since completion in 2013. A western span addition (between San Francisco and Yerba Buena Island) is being considered, and though funding hasn't been secured, the MTA has predicted it will be completed by 2030.

== See also ==
- Cycling in San Francisco
- San Francisco Bicycle Coalition
