= Motorist day =

Car-themed holidays

Man showing off his car

Motorist day, day of the car or car day can refer to various themed days focusing on car usage and the automobile's significance to society, or to a car-related event celebrating the phenomenon of driving. These observances may take place on fixed or movable dates.

== Examples ==
Some significant days for motoring around the world are:

- October 28 since 2010, bilens dag (Car Day) has been celebrated in Sweden. It was established by the Swedish Motor Trade Association (Motorbranschens Riksförbund, MRF) in collaboration with Bil Sweden, Motormännen (a Swedish interest organization for motorists), Motorförarnas Helnykterhetsförbund (MHF, the motorists' abstinence association), Kungliga Automobil Klubben (KAK), and the motor organization FMK (formerly Försvarets motorklubb).
- In Norway and Sweden, a traditional "cruising day" (rännardagen or rånedagen) falls on Maundy Thursday (a date falling between March 19 and April 22), when convoys of Norwegian cruisers or "rånere" (car enthusiasts who cruise in modified vehicles) travel to Strömstad, Sweden; while it is a public holiday in Norway with shops closed, it is a regular workday in Sweden. The tradition is likely over 50 years old. In recent years, the Swedish state-run liquor stores (Systembolaget) in the Strömstad area have been closed on the date to curb the festivities. The event centers on music, cars, and alcohol, and in recent years, Swedish "raggare" (car culture enthusiasts) have increasingly joined in.
- On May 29, Russia celebrates "Military Motorist Day" (Russian: День военного автомобилиста), a holiday for military and civilian personnel in Russia's automotive units, as well as other military personnel and conscripts who drive as part of their duties.
- On the last Sunday of October, Russia and Belarus celebrate "Motorist Day" (Russian: День автомобилиста), which was established in the Soviet Union by a decree on October 1, 1980.
- On the last Sunday of October, Ukraine celebrates "Motorist and Road Worker Day" (Ukrainian: День автомобіліста і дорожника), which has been a national holiday for workers in the automotive transport and road sectors since 1993.

== Resistance and satire ==
In recent years, there has been a strong focus on how to reduce car usage—measures that can, among other things, benefit the environment and public health while alleviating traffic congestion. Consequently, attitudes that celebrate driving as a phenomenon have in some instances come under criticism.

In 2019, the Swedish Car Day was marked by, among other things, a seminar at the Swedish Riksdag organized by the Riksdag Car Network—a political network within the legislature that focuses on issues related to motoring and cars. The network also distributed greetings to mark the occasion and handed out bags of the candy Ahlgrens cars to all members of the parliament, an initiative criticized by Ulla Andersson, among others.

In 2012, a satirical initiative called "Drive to Work Day" was launched in London, encouraging people who usually rely on public transport or active travel to drive instead. Some suggested driving with a bicycle mounted on a roof rack to demonstrate that cycling was a viable alternative. In 2026, Congresswoman Susie Lee of Nevada released a satirical video about "Drive to Work Day" to coincide with "Bike to Work Day"—an event that actually promotes active travel like cycling and draws on campaigns such as "Bike to Work" and cycling events like Critical Mass. The American motorcycle organization Ride to Work, based in Minnesota, organizes "Ride to Work Day" on the second Tuesday of June each year; however, since it encourages motorcycle use, this initiative can actually help reduce traffic congestion.

== See also ==
- Car culture, culture associated with the use, construction, maintenance, or modification of cars
- Car-free days, day promoting car-free travel
- Cruising (driving), travelling by car for pleasure
- Motonormativity, car ownership as the social norm
- Pedestrian Day, awareness day about pedestrians
- Road trip, long-distance journey on the road
- World Bicycle Day, international holiday celebrating the bicycle
