= SJBP =

SJBP may refer to:

- St. John the Baptist Parish, Louisiana
- San Jose Bike Party in San Jose, California
