= Bike Week =

Bike Week may refer to:

- Daytona Beach Bike Week, an annual motorcycle event and rally in Daytona Beach, Florida
- Laconia Bike Week, an annual motorcycle event and rally in Laconia, New Hampshire
- Bike Week (cycling), an annual international event that advocates bicycling for transportation
- Black Bike Week, an annual African-American motorcycle rally in Myrtle Beach, South Carolina
