= Timbuk2 =

American manufacturer

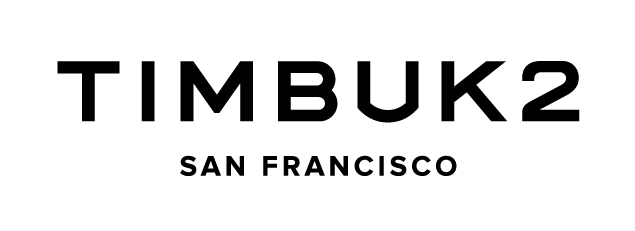
- Formerly: Scumbags
- Founded: San Francisco, California (1989)
- Founder: Rob Honeycutt
- Headquarters: San Francisco, California, United States
- Key people: Patti Cazzato, CEO
- Products: Messenger bags, Backpacks, Travel bags, Accessories
- Website: www.timbuk2.com

Timbuk2 is an American bag manufacturer based in San Francisco, California, known for its durable messenger bags, backpacks, and travel accessories. Founded in 1989 by bike messenger Rob Honeycutt, the company originally catered to the urban cycling community and gained recognition for its customizable, made-to-order designs. While it began with local production, Timbuk2 now manufactures both custom and non-custom products, with global distribution and a focus on sustainability initiatives such as bag recycling and reuse.

== History ==
Timbuk2 was founded in 1989 by bike messenger Rob Honeycutt in a garage in San Francisco's Mission District. Influenced by the Toyota "just in time" model, he created a bag pattern suited to custom orders for local bike dealer.

Honeycutt was fascinated by "just in time" manufacturing and studied the Toyota manufacturing model which led him to develop a bag pattern that was able to accommodate custom orders from independent bike dealers in San Francisco.

The company was originally named Scumbags; Honeycutt changed the name to Timbuk2 Designs in 1990. The name Timbuk2 was inspired in part by the American rock band Timbuk3 and the company's swirl logo was designed by Honeycutt and is meant to mimic the rotation of a bike wheel.

Non-custom products are manufactured in China, Vietnam, and Indonesia.

The company launched its flagship retail store in Hayes Valley, San Francisco in 2006. In 2011, Timbuk2 launched a bicycle share program in its retail stores. In 2013, the Timbuk2 opened a retail location in Seattle, Washington. That same year, the company incorporated recycled Bike to Work banners into messenger bags and donated a portion of the profits to the San Francisco Bicycle Coalition. Patti Cazzato was appointed to the role of CEO in July 2014. That same year, the company encouraged bag owners to reuse and recycle their bags through its Timbuk2 Life Cycle program.

Timbuk2 also added retail locations in Chicago, Denver, Los Angeles and Toronto in 2014. That same year, Timbuk2 collaborated with Blue Bottle Coffee Company to release a coffee travel kit. As well, the company was ranked as the second largest manufacturer in San Francisco by the San Francisco Business Times.

In July 2016, the company collaborated with the footwear company New Balance to release specially branded products. The company opened a flagship store in NoHo, Manhattan in October 2016. In June 2017, the company opened an additional location in Brooklyn. As of 2023, the Manhattan and Brooklyn locations are no longer open.

== Ownership ==
The company was sold to a venture capital firm in 2005. In 2006 it sold to private equity group TB2 Investors, which owned it until 2019. In August 2019 it was sold to Exemplis, a Los Angeles-based furniture company.
