= National Bike Month =

National Bike Month is a celebration of cycling held every May in the United States. It is sponsored by the League of American Bicyclists and celebrated in communities from coast-to-coast. Established in 1956, National Bike Month is a chance to showcase the many benefits of bicycling and to encourage more folks to giving bicycling a try.

As part of National Bike Month, National Bike to Work Week is usually held the third week of May, with Bike to Work Day being on that Friday.

== See also ==
- Bike-to-Work Day
- World Bicycle Day
