= Mark Dwight =

American businessman

- Education: Stanford University
- Occupation: CEO

Mark Dwight is an American businessman who is the founder and CEO of Rickshaw Bagworks, a San Francisco maker of custom bags, and SFMade, a non-profit focused on building the San Francisco's manufacturing sector. He previously worked for another bag maker, Timbuk2 designs where he was the CEO for 5 years. Dwight founded Rickshaw Bagworks in 2007. The company is based in San Francisco, where it manufacturers and sells bags, device sleeves, and accessories from their factory located in the Dogpatch neighborhood.

He sits on the board of directors of the San Francisco Chamber of Commerce and is the Small Business Commissioner of San Francisco.
