= Cycling in San Francisco =

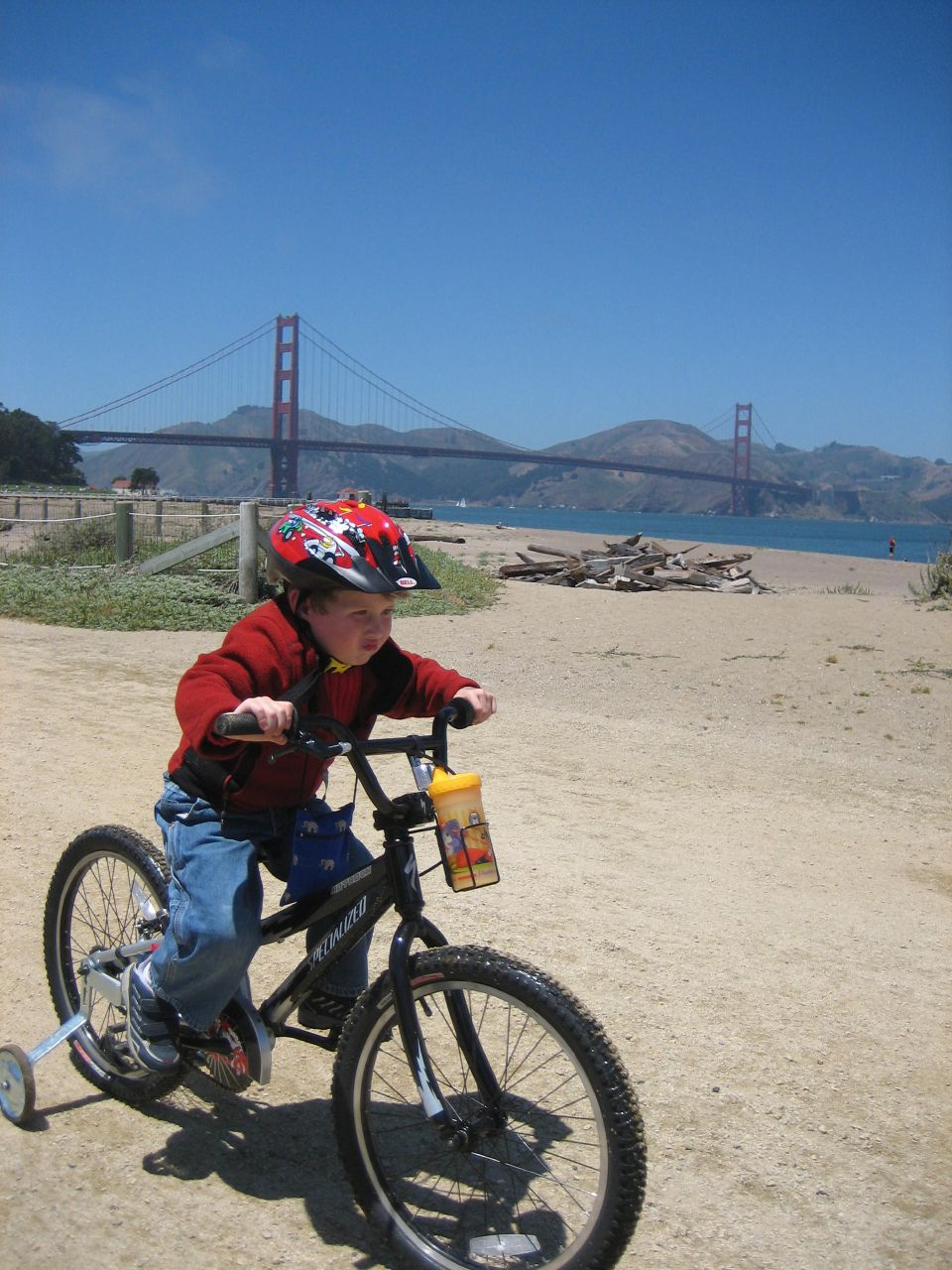
Boy on bicycle before the Golden Gate Bridge.

Cycling in San Francisco has grown in popularity in recent years, aided by improving cycling infrastructure and community support. San Francisco's compact urban form and mild climate enable cyclists to reach work, shopping, and recreational destinations quickly and comfortably. Though San Francisco's famed steep hills can make cycling difficult, many parts of the city are relatively flat, including some of the most densely populated. However, heavy automobile traffic, the lack of bike lanes on many streets, and difficulty in crossing major streets deter most residents from cycling frequently in San Francisco.

== History ==
The 1848 California Gold Rush transformed San Francisco from a small isolated town to the richest and most populous city on the West Coast within a single year. The city is situated on a roughly seven-by-seven mile square tip of the San Francisco Peninsula. Having little land upon which to develop, and laying out most of its streets and buildings in the pre-automobile era, San Francisco is now the second-most densely populated large city in the United States after New York City. The city's compact neighborhoods result in short trip distances for work, shopping, and recreation, which can be conveniently made by bicycle.

San Francisco's Transit First policy, adopted in 1973, identifies transit, bicyclists and pedestrians as the city's top transportation priorities. It states that "Travel by public transit, by bicycle, and on foot must be an attractive alternative to travel by private automobile", "Decisions regarding the use of limited public street and sidewalk space shall encourage the use of public rights of way by pedestrians, bicyclists, and public transit", and "Bicycling shall be promoted by encouraging safe streets for riding, convenient access to transit, bicycle lanes, and secure bicycle parking." A wide variety of city policies, neighborhood plans, and specific development plans have promoted these goals.

An expansion of existing bicycle infrastructure occurred as a result of the 1997 Bicycle Plan. Many miles of bike lanes were striped, hundreds of bike parking racks were installed, and educational programs were expanded. An update to the 1997 Bicycle Plan began in 2002 and was finished in 2005, although implementation of the plan was delayed until 2009 due to a lawsuit.

=== 2009 Bicycle Plan ===
The 2009 San Francisco Bicycle Plan is the guiding document to be used by city agencies to "increase safe bicycle use" over the next five years. The plan has eight "chapter goals" which are to:

1. Refine and expand the existing bicycle route network
2. Ensure plentiful, high-quality bicycle parking
3. Expand bicycle access to transit and bridges
4. Educate the public about bicycle safety
5. Improve bicycle safety through targeted enforcement
6. Promote and encourage safe bicycling
7. Adopt bicycle-friendly practices and policies
8. Prioritize and increase bicycle funding

The 2009 Bicycle Plan recommends 60 near-term improvements to the bicycle route network, which are anticipated to be constructed "within the next five years" (by 2014). 52 of these improvements are the addition of bicycle lanes to city streets, 3 are intersection improvements, 2 are the addition of bicycle paths, 1 is a traffic signal improvement, 1 is a signage improvement, and 1 is a bicycle route improvement. These 52 bicycle lane additions will add 34 miles of streets with bicycle lanes to the already existing 45 miles of streets with bicycle lanes.

The SFMTA began implementation of these near-term improvements on August 9, 2010, with the construction of bicycle lanes on Townsend Street between Eighth Street and the Embarcadero. Six months later, at the end of January 2011, 11 miles of the 34 miles of the proposed additional bicycle lanes were completed.

=== Better Market Street Project ===
On Tuesday, October 15, 2019, the San Francisco Municipal Transportation Agency board voted unanimously in favor of the Better Market Street proposal, a plan to improve bike, pedestrian, and transit-priority infrastructure, and restrict the use of personal cars on Market Street.

== Culture ==
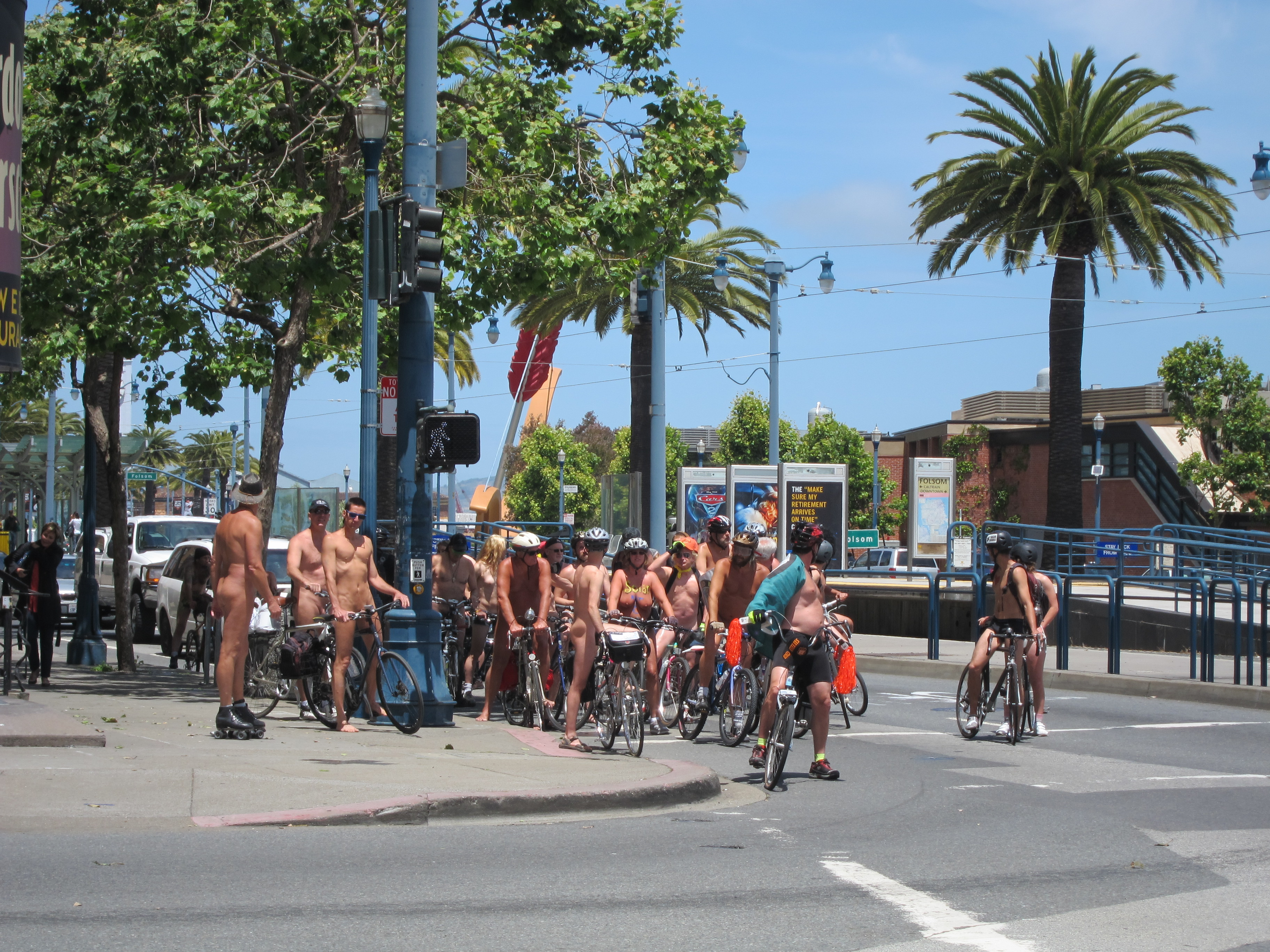
San Francisco holds its own edition of the World Naked Bike Ride annually.

San Francisco has an active and diverse cycling culture organized around many different bike-related social events and rides. Many of the well-known "cycling cliques" are represented here, including urban cyclists, road racing bicycle riders ("roadies"), messengers, and fixed-gear riders ("fixie hipsters"). San Francisco is also home to the film producer Macaframa, which produces short films featuring urban fixed-gear cycling.

=== Bicycle clubs ===
Recreational bicycle clubs located in San Francisco include San Francisco Cycle Club, Mission Cycling, SF Fixed, Different Spokes, Velo Girls, Aids Lifecycle, and Team in Training. These groups normally post ride calendars on their webpages and are open to cyclists of varying skill levels.

=== Sunday Streets ===
Introduced in 2008, Sunday Streets aims to promote public health and community participation by closing a series of streets on automobile traffic on selected Sundays throughout the year. In 2008, there were two events (two different Sundays) on two unique routes, in 2009, six events on four unique routes, in 2010, nine events on five unique routes, and in 2011, eight events on six unique routes. The events allow residents to bicycle, skate, run, walk, do yoga, or just people-watch in public spaces normally devoted to automobiles.

=== Bike to Work Day ===
San Francisco's Bike to Work Day, held in May of each year, aims to encourage commuters to try bicycling as a healthy alternative means of getting to work by organizing groups of cyclists to ride together starting from various neighborhoods, matching new bicycle commuters with more experienced "Bike Buddies", and providing free snacks and coffee at "Energizer Stations" along the busiest routes. Bike to Work Day raises awareness of cycling as a form of transportation, as bicycle have far outnumbered automobiles on the main commercial street, Market Street, during commuting hours on Bike to Work Day in recent years.

=== Bike Kitchen ===
The Bike Kitchen is a bike co-op — a 501(c)(3) non-profit assisted-self-service bike shop located at 650H Florida Street in the Mission neighborhood. Its mission is to "teach people of all ages and backgrounds how to repair bicycles." Member pay a day-use fee, annual membership fee, or volunteer to gain access to the Bike Kitchen's tools, parts, and volunteer mechanics.

=== Critical Mass ===
The first Critical Mass bicycle ride took place on September 25, 1992, in San Francisco, and has since spread to hundreds of cities worldwide. The ride meets on the last Friday of each month at 6:00 pm at Justin Herman Plaza, and is typically attended by several thousand cyclists, who then ride through the city en masse, claiming the normally auto-dominated streets for bicycle use. The event is controversial even within the cycling community in San Francisco, some claiming that it raises beneficial public awareness of cycling issues, and others claiming that it reduces public support for cyclists' needs by enraging motorists and commuters blocked by the event. The 1999 film We Are Traffic! is about Critical Mass in San Francisco.

=== SF Bike Party ===
It was inspired by San Jose Bike Party in early 2011 and occurs on the first Friday of every month at 7:30 pm. Every month has a different ride theme and cyclists dress accordingly. The ride is about 10 miles long with two 30 minutes stops to socialize and dance.

=== Tour de Fat ===
Tour de Fat is a one-day bicycle parade and festival sponsored by the New Belgium Brewing Company and takes place each summer in Golden Gate Park. It features live music and circus and vaudeville-type acts. Profits from beer sales at the event are donated to the San Francisco Bicycle Coalition and the Bay Area Ridge Trail Council. The event is not unique to San Francisco, but in 2010 also took place in Chicago, Milwaukee, Seattle, Portland, Boise, Fort Collins, Denver, San Diego, Tempe, Los Angeles, and Austin.

=== Winterfest ===
Winterfest, held in December of each year, is the San Francisco Bicycle Coalition's main fund-raising event. This "festive evening to celebrate the love of riding a bike" is attended by SFBC members, bicycle industry leaders, local business supporters, local artists, and politicians. In 2010, it was attended by over 1,000 people and raised $80,000 for the SFBC's advocacy efforts.

=== Bicycle Film Festival ===
The Bicycle Film Festival, founded in 2001 in New York City by Brendt Barbur, "celebrates the bicycle through music, art and, of course, film". In San Francisco, the festival shows bicycle-related films on three consecutive nights in July at the Victoria Theatre near 16th and Mission streets. In 2010, the festival toured 36 cities worldwide.

== Infrastructure ==
=== Bicycle route network ===
As of 2008, San Francisco had 23 miles of streets with bike paths (Class I), 45 miles of streets with bike lanes (Class II), and 132 miles of streets with bike routes (Class III). Almost all of the bike paths are located in parks on the extreme western edge of the city: the Presidio, Lincoln Park, Golden Gate Park, and Fort Funston Park. Most of the bike lanes are located in relatively flat neighborhoods close to the center of the city, including SoMa, the Mission, Haight-Ashbury, and the Richmond. Bike routes form a nearly complete citywide network extending to most neighborhoods, but increase cyclists' safety very little. 53 miles of the bike routes are simply streets wide enough to ride on the right side clear of automobile traffic, 23 miles of the bike routes have sharrows painted on the street to indicate that cyclists may ride in the center of the lane, and 56 miles of the bike routes contain only signs indicating the number of the bicycle route, but no special design or marking for bicycles at all.

=== Bicycle parking ===
In the past several years, the SFMTA has installed over 1,500 "inverted-U" bicycle parking racks. These are located on sidewalks in commercial districts and allow cyclists to easily lock up to two bicycles using secure U-locks. Since 2010, the SFMTA has installed ten "bicycle corrals", which are groups of five to eight inverted-U racks located in the street next to the sidewalk (usually replacing one automobile parking space). All parking garages in San Francisco open to the public must also provide a certain number of bicycle parking racks, the number of which is based on the number of automobile parking spaces provided.

== Bicycle sharing ==
San Francisco has a public bicycle-sharing system, Ford GoBike, which launched in 2013 and serves the city of San Francisco, as well as some outlying cities on both sides of the Bay Area.

In 2017, private bicycle-sharing company Bluegogo attempted to launch a dockless system in San Francisco, but pulled out due to legal concerns. Another private dockless bicycle-sharing company called Jump Bikes commenced operation in the city in January 2018 after obtaining an 18-month permit for operating its system of dockless electric bicycles.

== Statistics ==
=== Prevalence of cycling ===
Annual bicycle counts conducted by the Municipal Transportation Agency (SFMTA) in 2010 showed the number of cyclists at 33 locations had increased 58% from the 2006 baseline counts. The SFMTA estimates that about 128,000 trips are made by bicycle each day in the city, or 6% of total trips, and that 16% of San Francisco residents are "frequent cyclists", defined as cycling two or more days per week. According to the U.S. Census Bureau, bicycles accounted for 3.2% of all trips to work in 2009, up from 1.9% in 2003.

=== Safety ===
The SFMTA reported 468 bicycle injury collisions in 2008, which was the lowest number of injury collisions per work trip of the 12 other California cities with populations over 250,000. Of those collisions in which fault was assigned, half were found to be the fault of a motorist, and half were found to be the fault of the bicyclist. In collisions where motorists at fault, the most common reasons were: turning without signaling, opening the car door when it was unsafe, and not yielding to oncoming traffic when making a left turn.

== Advocacy ==
=== San Francisco Bicycle Coalition ===
The San Francisco Bicycle Coalition (SFBC) is a California 501(c)(4) nonprofit public benefit corporation established to "transform San Francisco's streets and neighborhoods into more livable and safe places by promoting the bicycle for everyday transportation." Founded in 1971, dormant through much of the 1980s, and re-founded in 1991, the SFBC in 2011 has a dues-paying membership of over 12,000, making it the largest bicycle advocacy organization in the United States. The SFBC organizes or promotes cycling-related events such as Bike to Work Day, Winterfest, Sunday Streets, and bike valet parking at public events.

=== San Francisco Bicycle Advisory Committee ===
The San Francisco Bicycle Advisory Committee consists of 11 San Francisco voting members appointed by the San Francisco Board of Supervisors, each of whom resides in one of the 11 supervisorial districts and is nominated by their district's supervisor. In addition to the 11 voting members, non-voting representatives from the following city departments attend committee meetings: the Police Department, the Department of Public Works, the Municipal Railway, the Department of City Planning, and the Bureau of Engineering of the Department of Parking and Traffic. The committee was established by Ordinance 365-90 on 1990-11-09. Committee projects include oversight and facilitation of the five-year Bicycle Plan Update, improved transit access for bicycles, and funding for bicycle improvements to increase road safety.

== See also ==
- Bicycle Kitchen
