= Bicycle Day =

Bicycle Day may refer to:

- World Bicycle Day, declared by United Nations General Assembly in 2018, to be celebrated on 3rd June, globally
- Bicycle Day (psychedelic holiday), the global holiday celebrating the discovery of LSD, and psychedelics in general
