= Leszek Sibilski =

Polish cyclist

- Born: April 1, 1958 (age 68)
- Citizenship: Poland / United States
- Education: Academy of Physical Education in Poznań
- Occupations: sociologist, university teacher, cyclist
- Employer(s): Catholic University of America, Montgomery College, Marymount University
- Known for: originator of the World Bicycle Day
- Spouse: Krystyna
- Children: 2

Leszek Jan Sibilski (born April 1, 1958) is a Polish-American sociologist, track cyclist, and the originator of the World Bicycle Day.

== Education and professional career ==
Leszek Sibilski graduated from Education and Sport Science at the Academy of Physical Education in Poznań. In 2000, he earned a Ph.D. in Sociology in Social Inclusion and Social Movements from the Jagiellonian University in Kraków, Poland. As a sociologist, he focuses on climate change, the environment, family, public policy, global poverty, youth, and the role of women in contemporary society.

In 1980s, Sibilski worked for Przegląd Sportowy daily and Sportowiec weekly as a reporter and photographer, carrying out interviews with, among others, Lech Wałęsa and Eddy Merckx. He has also been a physical education teacher at schools in Witaszyce and Jarocin. In 1987, Sibilski decided to move from Poland when, during a business trip to the United States, he was offered a post at the Achilles Track Club, New York City. Between 1989 and 1993, he served as the Director for International Affairs there. He has also worked for the World Bank, and the United Nations. Later, he became professor at the Catholic University of America, Montgomery College, and Marymount University.

== Cyclist ==
From 1971 to 1983, he trained in track cycling. He was national junior champion in sprint as well as on the 500 and 1000 metres distances. He was also a member of a national team. In 1976, Sibilski was chosen Cyclist of the Year by the Polish Olympic Committee. Though he did not continue his professional career as a senior, he remained active in promoting sport. He became especially engaged in improving the status of athletes with disabilities in developing countries and minority participation in sport. He took part in the 2010 Winter Paralympics torch relay. In 2015, publishing an article titled "Cycling is Everyone's Business", Sibilski started a grassroots campaign to establish a World Bicycle Day. He received the formal support of the Turkmenistan Representation to the United Nations. On April 12, 2018, the resolution establishing June 3 as World Bicycle Day was supported by 193 countries of which 56 were co-sponsors. On 15 March 2022, following similar campaign by Sibilski, UN General Assembly adopted a resolution on integration of mainstream bicycling into public transportation systems for sustainable development.

Sibilski is also engaged in commemoration of the 1978 air crash near Gabare, Bulgaria in which five Polish cyclists died. He was not a member of the team due to his commitment at the university.

Sibilski received several awards, including from the Mayors of New York City, Boston, the China Disabled Persons' Federation, president Bill Clinton, Inspiring Jewish Journeys Award for Education (2012), Leo Foley Award for Outstanding Educator at the Catholic University of America (2007), the Trailblazer Award by the World Bicycle Relief. He was a Kosciuszko Foundation and Harvard Kennedy School scholar.

== Private life ==
Sibilski grew up in Jarocin, Poland. He is married to Krystyna and is father to Jakub and Agnieszka. He lives in Washington, D.C. He holds both Polish and American citizenships.

== Honours ==
- Bene Merito honorary distinction, Poland (2026)
