= Balkan Bulgarian Airlines Flight 107 =

1978 passenger plane crash in Gabare, Bulgaria

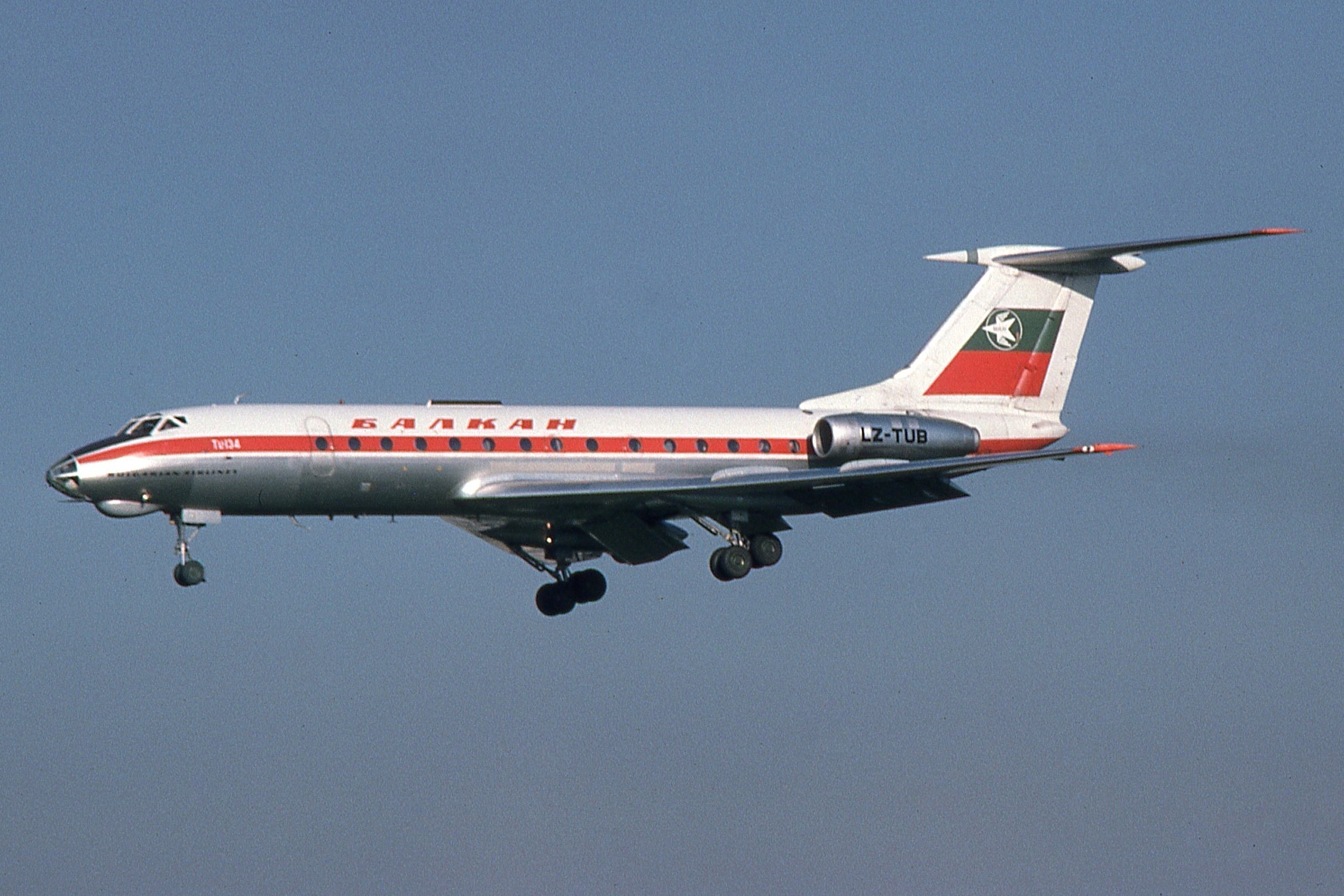
- LZ-TUB, the aircraft involved, in 1975

Accident
- Date: 16 March 1978
- Summary: Undetermined
- Site: Gabare, near Byala Slatina, Bulgaria; 43°19′39″N 23°52′23″E

Aircraft
- Aircraft type: Tupolev Tu-134
- Operator: Balkan Bulgarian Airlines
- ICAO flight No.: LZ 107
- Registration: LZ-TUB
- Flight origin: Sofia Vrazhdebna Airport, Sofia, Bulgaria
- Destination: Warsaw Airport, Warsaw, Poland
- Occupants: 73
- Passengers: 66
- Crew: 7
- Fatalities: 73
- Survivors: 0

Balkan Bulgarian Airlines Flight 107 was an accident that occurred on 16 March 1978, when a Tupolev Tu-134 operated by Balkan Bulgarian Airlines crashed on an international flight from Sofia Airport to Warsaw Airport. All 73 passengers and crew died in the crash (66 passengers and a crew of 7). As of 2026, it remains the deadliest accident in Bulgarian aviation history. The exact cause of the crash remains unknown.

A 2024 investigation by "Biograph" journal found witnesses in former communist Committee for State Security (DS) who testified that the aircraft had two unlisted passengers, who were most likely DS-trained agents from Arab countries. The aircraft was most likely hijacked in-flight and crashed as a result of onboard fighting, neither of which the communist government was ready to admit.

== Aircraft ==
The aircraft Tupolev Tu-134, tail number LZ-TUB, was produced in 1968 by the Kharkiv State Aircraft Manufacturing Company. It belonged to Balkan Bulgarian Airlines, and had 72 passenger seats and room for seven crew. The flight in question was piloted by Captain Hristo Hristov.

== Accident ==
On departure from Sofia, flight LZ 107 began to climb to 8,850 metres (29,040 ft) but at 4,900 metres (16,100 ft), it turned on a heading of 050 degrees. It turned again to 270 degrees before it began an abnormal descent. The aircraft crashed 10 minutes from takeoff near the village of Gabare, close to Byala Slatina, 130 km northeast of Sofia, killing all 73 people on board. At the time of the crash, the aircraft was flying at a speed of 800 kilometres per hour (432 kn; 497 mph) with almost full fuel tanks, containing 11 tons of fuel. The nature of the emergency and whether the aircraft was under control at the moment of impact were never established.

After the crash, the Bulgarian Army quickly arrived at the scene, and sealed it off. The investigation performed afterwards was superficial. The official cause given by the Bulgarian authorities was a "malfunction of electrical installation". The accident was quickly forgotten, with no further investigations being conducted. The haste with which the disaster was "forgotten" and the superficial investigation that was carried out raised doubts. This sparked speculation as to the real cause of the crash. One version of the event claimed that the Tu-134 collided with a MiG-21 of the Bulgarian Air Force. Another version assumed that the aircraft was shot down mistakenly by the Bulgarian anti-aircraft defense system. These claims are driven by the fact that there was a Warsaw Pact military base in the area.

== Victims ==
The victims of the crash were 37 Polish passengers, 27 Bulgarian passengers, two British passengers and seven crew members.

Among the victims were members of the Polish national track cycling team (Tadeusz Włodarczyk, Witold Stachowiak, Marek Kolasa, Krzysztof Otocki and Jacek Zdaniuk) and members of the Bulgarian national rhythmic gymnastics team (Valentina Kirilova, Snezhana Mikhailova, Albena Petrova, Sevdalina Popova and Rumyana Stefanova with their coach Julieta Shishmanova). Other victims included the Polish Vice-Minister of Culture Janusz Wilhelmi and Bulgarian footballer Georgi Dimitrov.

== Commemoration ==
A marble monument located in a gorge near the village of Gabare commemorates the accident and its victims. It is placed in hard-to-reach terrain and no path leads towards it. In 2016, on the initiative of Leszek Sibilski and Wacław Skarul, a memorial plaque was unveiled at the velodrome Arena Pruszków in Pruszków, Poland. It reads "The living owe it to those who can no longer speak to tell their story."

== See also ==
- List of accidents involving sports teams
