= Bike Week (cycling) =

International cycling event

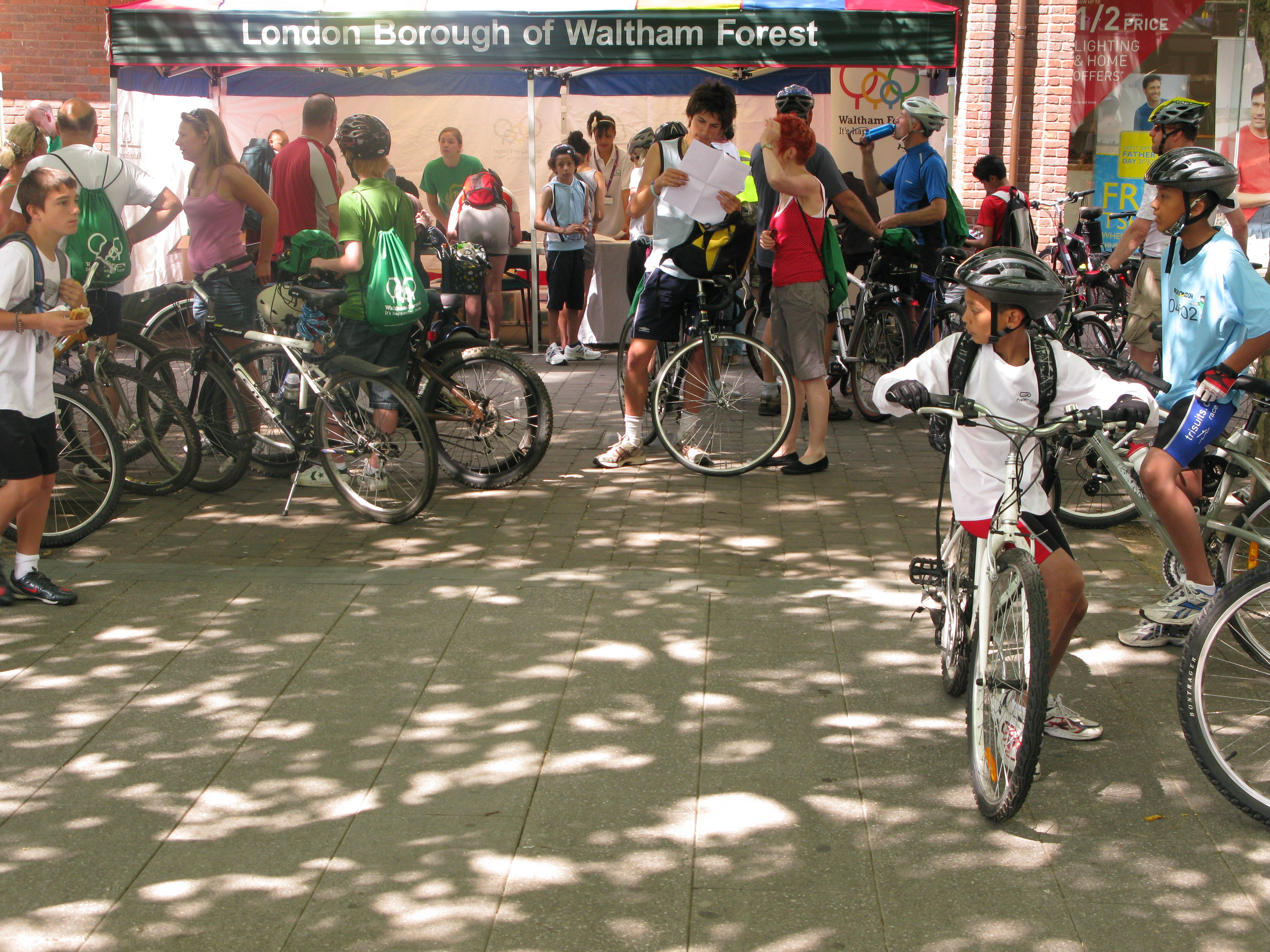
Riders assemble for a ride organized by the London Cycling Campaign, as part of Bike Week activities

Bike Week is a yearly international event, taking place in different countries throughout the world. It is typically a seven-day event that advocates bicycling for transportation. The event has been steadily gaining popularity in Asian, American and European cities and countries over the past decade. Bike Week has been running in the UK since 1923.

Bike Week typically takes place in the summer, and runs in the UK during the second week of June, following just after the international World Bicycle Day on 3 June. Celebrities that have taken part in the past include Fearne Cotton, Olivia Williams, and Jeremy Vine.

== UK and Ireland ==
Bike Week, organized by Cycling UK, is an annual celebration to showcase cycling. Bike Week takes place during the second week of June in the United Kingdom, with a parallel event in Ireland called National Bike Week. In 2019, Bike Week ran from Saturday 8 to Sunday 16 June.

The concept of Bike Week is "everyday cycling for everyone" and aims to encourage those who wouldn't normally cycle to get on their bikes. Any outing on a bike counts – whether that’s nipping around to a friend's house, cycling to work or school, enjoying a leisurely ride with the family, or tackling a cycling challenge.

Every year around 500 events are registered as part of Bike Week, such as family-friendly rides, bike maintenance events, bike breakfasts and group rides, to name but a few. Around 300,000 extra people choose to take part every year, on top of the 2.4 million who already cycle regularly in the UK.

A social media campaign runs through Bike Week called the #7DaysofCycling focusing on different cycling experiences and encouraging everyone to talk about their experiences and raise awareness of the benefits of cycling. Each day has a different theme, from cycling to work to the benefits of cycling on mental health.

Bike Week is traditionally launched with the annual APPCG bike ride through London, where MPs, peers, and influential members of the cycling industry attend a reception before riding through London. In 2019 this included the inaugural Bike Week summit which was attended by the transport minister Michael Ellis.

== United States ==
In the United States of America, May is recognized as Bike Month, and Bike to Work Week is always either the first or second full week of May. Austin, Boston, Pasadena, Portland, Roseville, Santa Barbara, Sacramento, San Diego, San Francisco, and Washington are among the US cities that actively participate.

== Canada ==
In Canada, Bike Week occurs in either May or June because Bike Month is typically from 25 May to 25 June. Calgary, Edmonton, Toronto, Ottawa, Victoria and Halifax are among the cities that participated in 2009. Vancouver participates every year.

== See also ==
- Bicycle commuting
- Bike-to-Work Day
- Bike to Work Week Victoria
- World Bicycle Day
