= San Jose Bike Party =

Monthly social bicycle ride in California

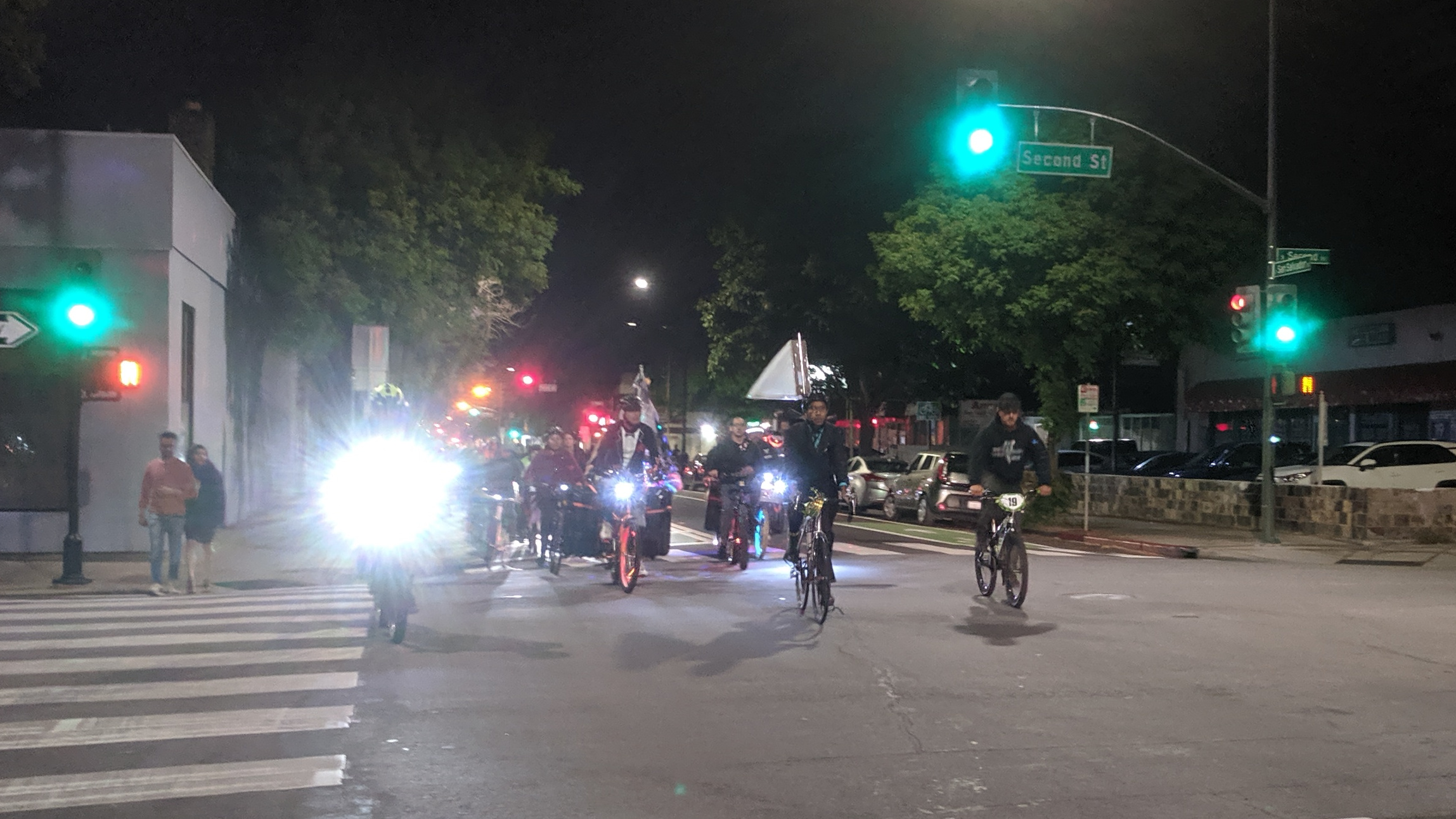
- SJ Bike Party group moving as a light turns green on May 17, 2019
- Formation: October 2007; 18 years ago
- Type: non-profit corporation
- Purpose: bicycle events
- Location: San Jose, California
- Website: sjbikeparty.org

San Jose Bike Party
- Dates: third Fridays
- Frequency: Monthly
- Location: route announced 1–2 days before ride
- Participants: over 1000 in Summer

San Jose Bike Party is a monthly social bicycle ride event in and around San Jose, California held on the third Friday of every month. Attendance varies with weather and time of year, usually ranging from hundreds in the winter months to low thousands in the summer. Established in 2007, it is the original 'bike party' now replicated in other cities around the world. Its motto is "Building community through cycling".

== Monthly ride ==
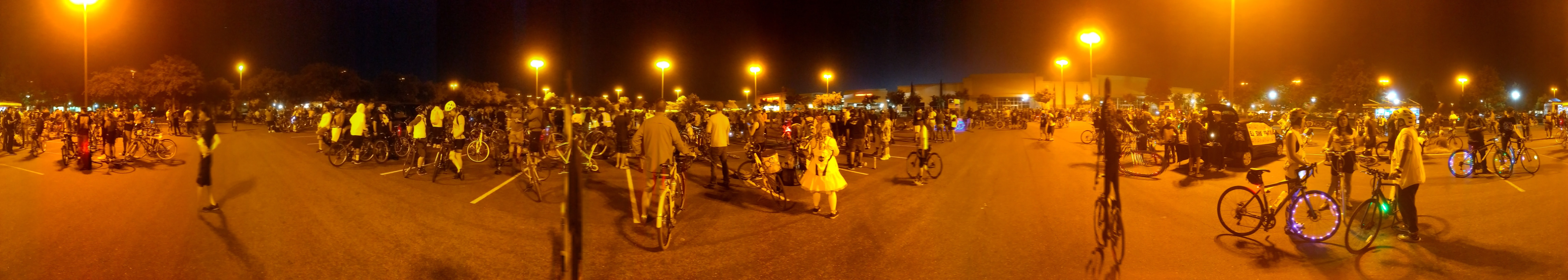
San Jose Bike Party at a regroup point on June 21, 2019

San Jose Bike Party's rides are on the 3rd Friday of each month. The ride begins at 8pm, with a suggested meet-up time of 7:30pm.

There is a different route and title theme for each month. The distance ranges from 15–30 miles. The route is announced on email, the web site and social media 24–48 hours before the ride. The relatively short notice of the route announcements started as a preventative measure against unruly riders who caused some mischief.

=== Regroup points ===
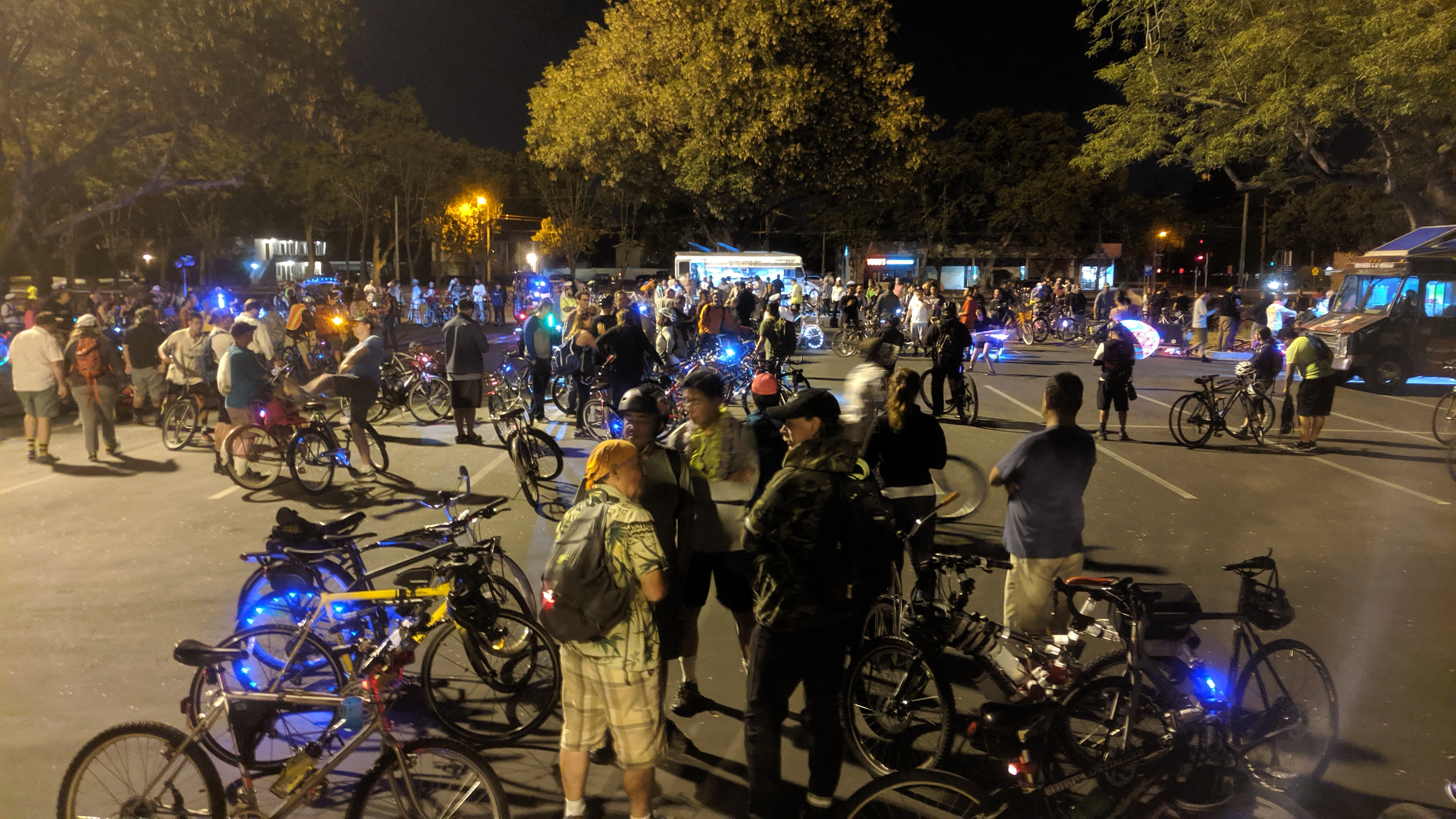
San Jose Bike Party at regroup point on July 19, 2019

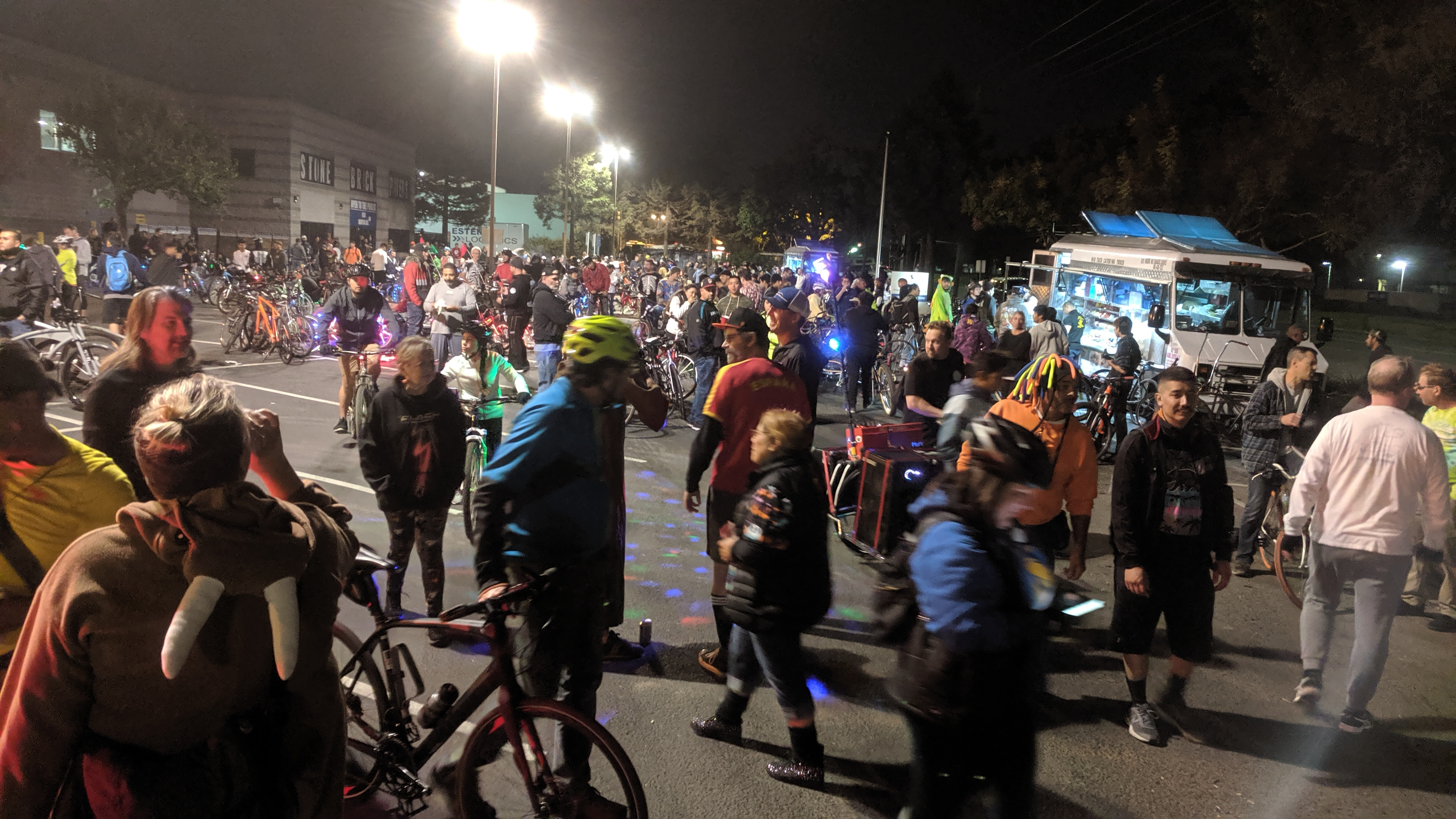
San Jose Bike Party at regroup point on October 18, 2019

Two regroup points along the route allow everyone to catch up. They serve as rest and party stops. The overall pace is slow enough that some families bring their kids. The regroup points often have food trucks and DJ'ed music.

=== Nighttime rides ===
The 8pm start time, after the evening commute, means the regular monthly rides are always night rides. The ride starts before sunset from May to August at San Jose's latitude.

California law requires lights and reflectors for cycling on public streets at night.

=== November 2018 ride cancellation ===
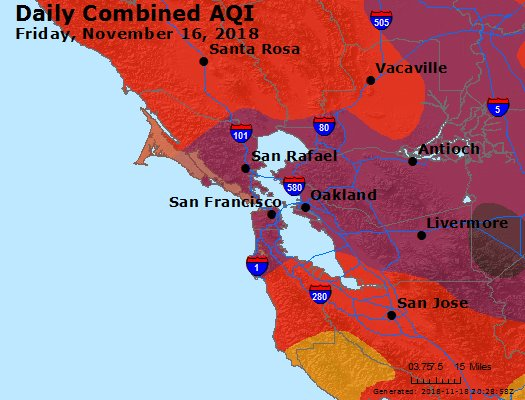
EPA air quality map showing unhealthy air in the SF Bay Area due to smoke from the Camp Fire on the day of SJ Bike Party's November 2018 ride cancellation

San Jose Bike Party usually rides regardless of weather. The ride of November 16, 2018 was the first time a ride was cancelled. The reason for the cancellation was unhealthy air quality. The entire Bay Area was affected by wind-blown smoke from the Camp Fire far to the north in Butte County. For 2 days including the day of the monthly ride, the Air quality index in the Bay Area exceeded 200, a level indicating "very unhealthy" air.

The same route from the cancelled ride was rerun, as well as the "Cartoon/Anime Ride" theme, in June 2019 under direction of the same ride leader volunteer who had originally prepared it.

=== 2020 cancellations & virtual rides ===
The COVID-19 pandemic caused all bicycle parties to be cancelled from March to July 2020. From August 2020 to June 2021, the bike parties were hosted as virtual events.

== Emphasis on civility and safety ==
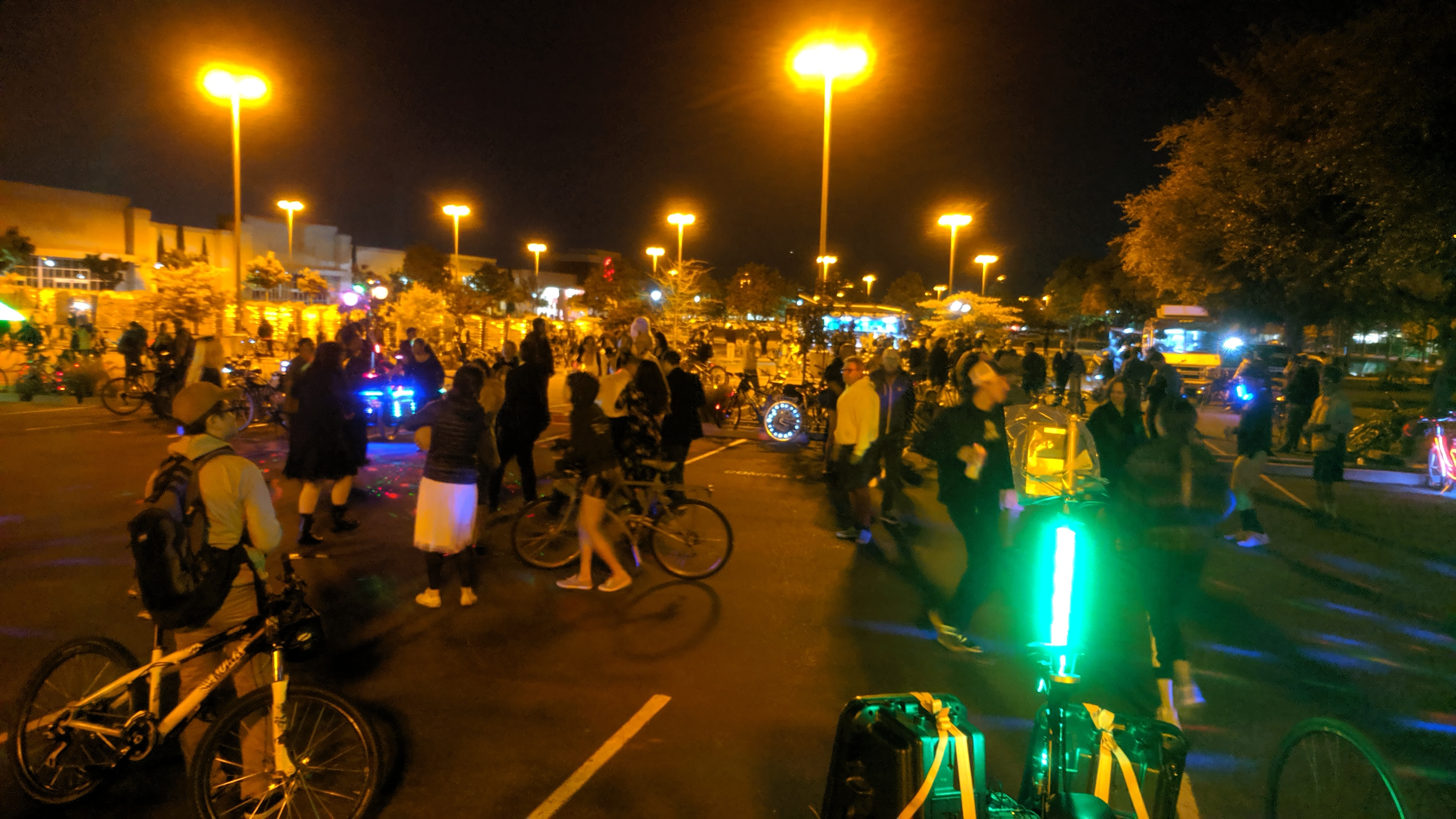
San Jose Bike Party at a regroup point on May 17, 2019

San Jose Bike Party differentiates itself from protest rides such as nearby San Francisco's Critical Mass. Bike Party is a social event, not a protest. The organization encourages riders to ride safely, obey rules of the road and set a good example for others as much as possible. They repeatedly remind riders of 6 rules as "How we ride".

- Stop at lights
- Stay to the right
- Pack your Trash
- Roll Past Conflict
- Ride Sober
- Be nice

Making a point about safety is relevant. Accidents and injuries have occasionally occurred.

== Visits by politicians ==
Mostly during election seasons, San Jose's Mayor and City Council members or candidates for those offices have ridden with San Jose Bike Party. City Councilman Pierluigi Oliverio wrote an op-ed for San Jose Inside about his experience riding with Bike Party in March 2009.

Bike Party has also attracted visiting politicians. There have been two occurrences of participation by mayors of sister city Dublin, Ireland. In both cases a special event ride was arranged on a weekend afternoon with a shorter route to fit the schedule of the Mayor's visit to San Jose. The ride for Lord Mayor Andrew Montague was on March 11, 2012. The ride for Lord Mayor Oisín Quinn was on March 9, 2014.

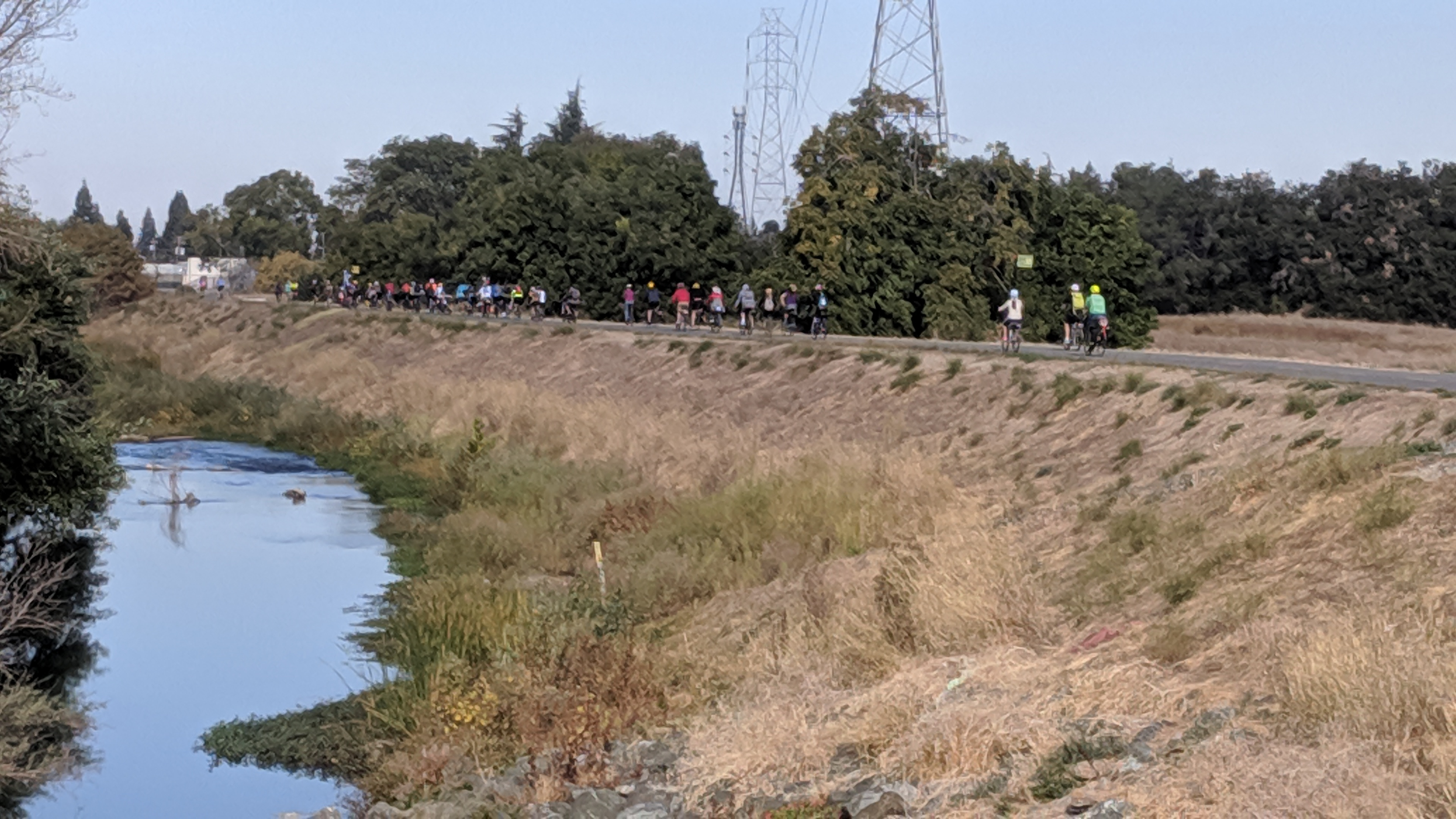
Bike to the Bay 2019 group on the Guadalupe River Trail on October 13, 2019

San Jose Bike Party has since 2016 assisted organizing the annual "Bike to the Bay" event led by Santa Clara County Supervisor Dave Cortese. It is a group bicycle ride held in October along the Guadalupe River Trail from near downtown to Alviso Marina County Park for the Day on the Bay festival.

== Organization ==
Established in 2007, San Jose Bike Party was the original 'bike party', now replicated in other cities. It was originally founded as an informal association. It later achieved non-profit incorporation in 2014 so it could accept donations and work with the city on events. The organization can use the Volunteer Protection Act to shield volunteers from liability when acting on behalf of the organization. It remains an all-volunteer organization with no employees.

== Awards ==
San Jose Bike Party was awarded "2019 Environmental Organization of the Year" by the Santa Clara County chapter of the League of Conservation Voters. A San Jose Bike Party social media post included a photo of the LCV award and a "Certificate of Special Congressional Recognition" signed September 26, 2019 by Congresswoman Anna Eshoo.

== See also ==
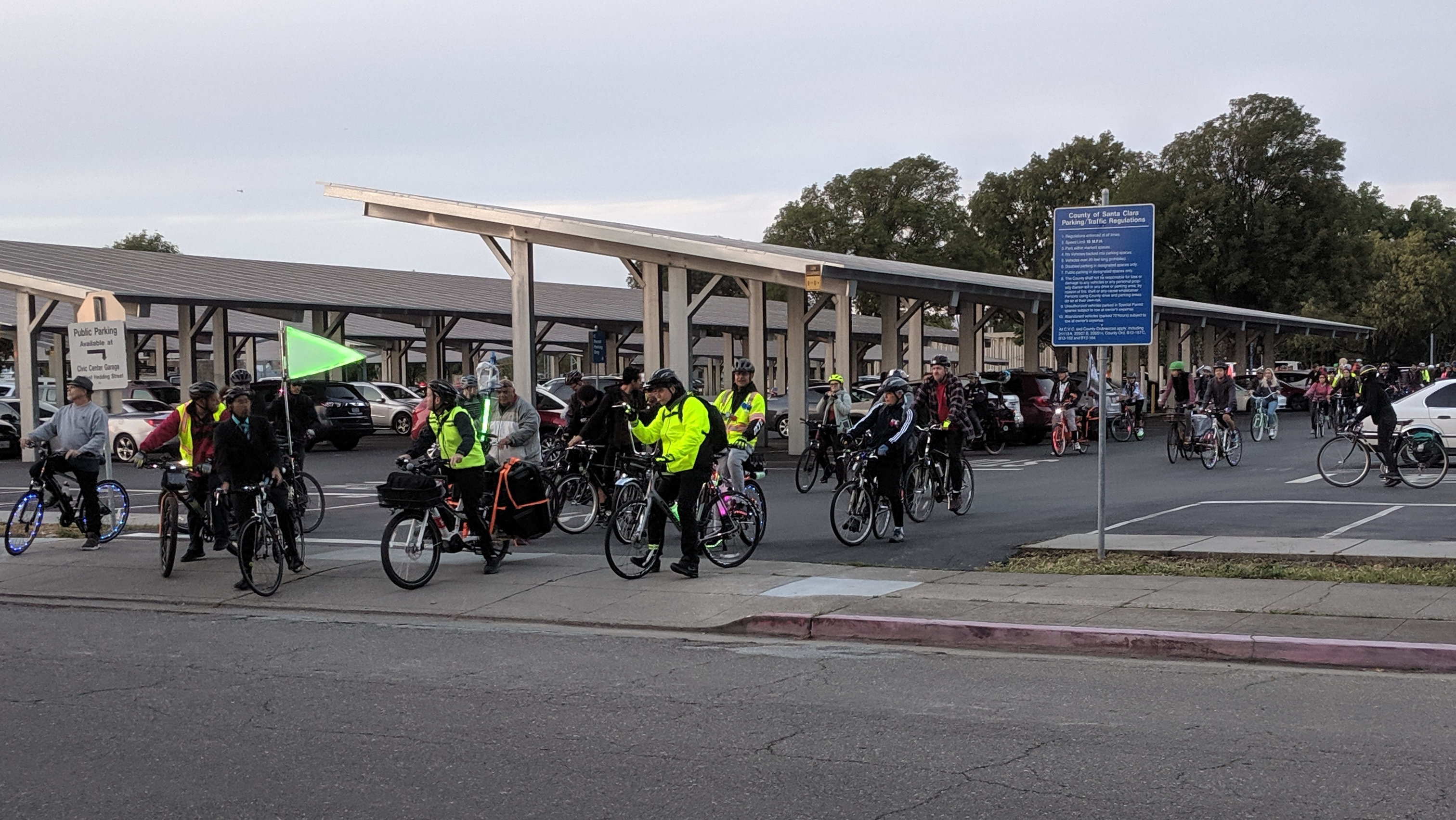
San Jose Bike Party assembling for departure at start point on May 17, 2019

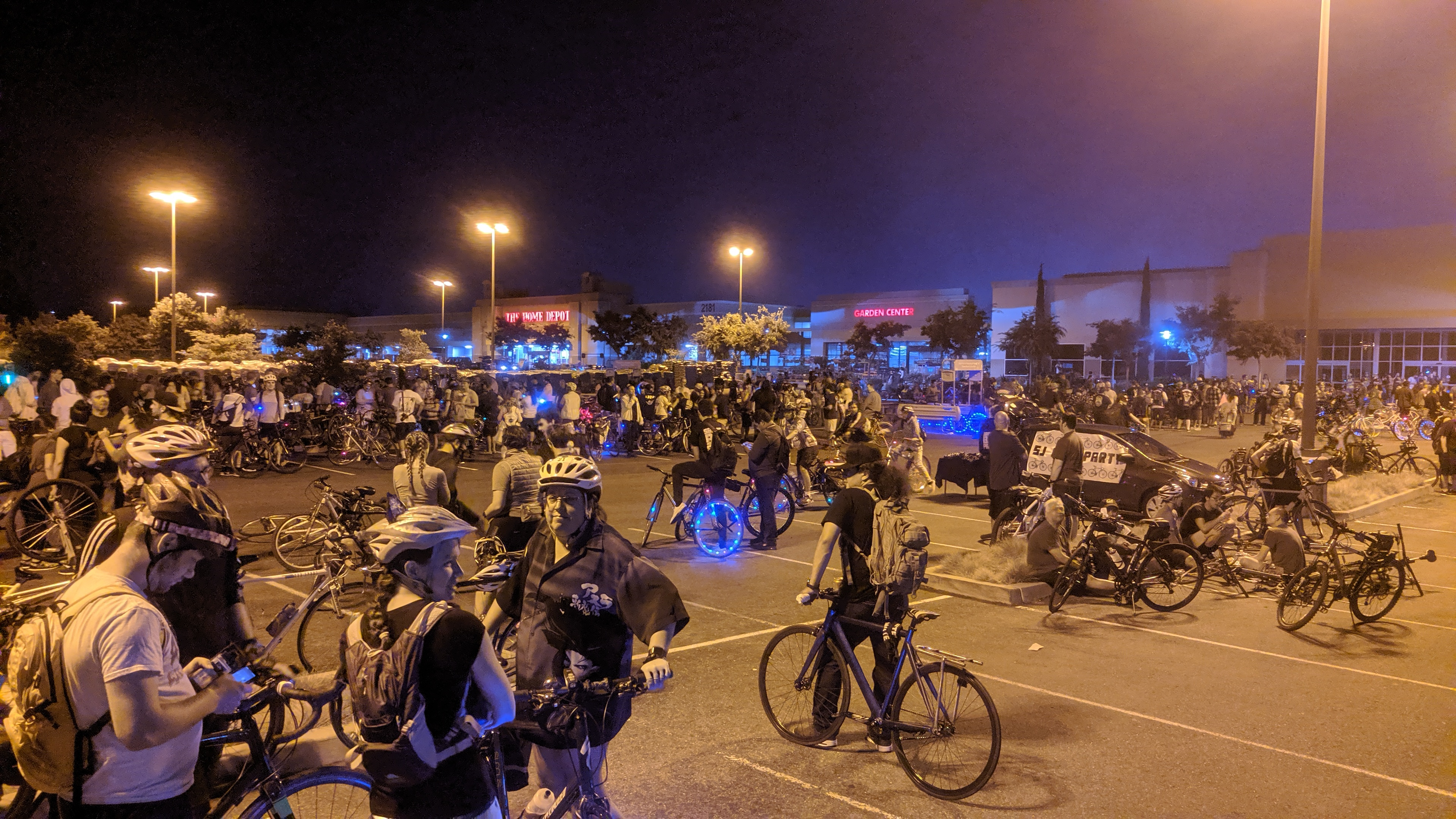
San Jose Bike Party at a regroup point on June 21, 2019

- Bicycle-friendly communities
- Cycling in San Jose, California
- San Francisco Bike Party
