= San Francisco Bicycle Coalition =

- Formation: 1971; 55 years ago
- Type: Non-profit corporation
- Purpose: Bicycle advocacy
- Headquarters: 1720 Market St; San Francisco, CA 94102
- Region served: San Francisco
- Executive Director: Christopher White
- Website: sfbike.org

The San Francisco Bicycle Coalition (SFBC) is a California 501(c)(4) nonprofit public-benefit corporation established to "transform San Francisco's streets and neighborhoods into more livable and safe places by promoting the bicycle for everyday transportation." Founded in 1971, dormant through much of the 1980s, and re-founded in 1990, the SFBC is considered to be one of the most influential membership-based advocacy organizations in San Francisco. In 2024 it had over 6,000 dues-paying members.

== History ==
The San Francisco Bicycle Coalition was founded by Jack Murphy in 1971 with the sole mission of "promoting the bicycle for everyday transportation". It was a volunteer-based coalition of representatives from eight clubs including the Sierra Club and San Francisco Tomorrow. One of its first victories was car-free Sundays in Golden Gate Park, inspired by a similar closure of streets to motor vehicles in New York's Central Park. When Market Street was reconstructed in the early 1970s to install the Bay Area Rapid Transit and Muni Metro rail systems underground, the SFBC lobbied for protected bike lanes to be constructed. They would be built between the sidewalk curb and parking spaces, along with landscaped medians and left-turn pockets. In 1972, the San Francisco Board of Supervisors voted 10–1 to approve this project, but the idea was opposed by the San Francisco Department of Public Works and the protected bike lanes were never built. Although failing to win political support for the installation on bike lanes, the SFBC was able to gain access for bicycles through the Broadway Tunnel, on Skyline Drive, the Golden Gate Bridge, and along with the East Bay Bicycle Coalition, to the Bay Area Rapid Transit system.

The SFBC was inactive for most of the 1980s, and was re-founded in October 1990 with the first issue of its newsletter, then called the "Tubular Times" (the newsletter is called the "Tube Times"). By 1996, the group had 1,000 members, its first paid staff member (Executive Director Dave Snyder), and its first office at 1095 Market Street. San Francisco's 1997 Bicycle Plan resulted in additional bicycle lanes on many city streets, including Arguello and Marina boulevards, Seventh Avenue, and Howard, Oak, Fell, Polk, Fifth, Second, and Cesar Chavez streets. In 2000, the SFBC entered electoral politics, changing its non-profit tax status to be able to endorse candidates. It conducted member surveys to determine which candidates for the Board of Supervisors to support, and organized volunteers by district to ensure that cycling issues were discussed during elections. In 2003, the SFBC led a community outreach effort to involve thousands of San Francisco residents and neighborhood groups to be included in the planning process for the update to the 1997 Bicycle Plan. This five-year plan bundled together 60 bicycle route network improvement projects and was unanimously approved by the Board of Supervisors in June 2005. However, a lawsuit that resulted in requiring an Environmental Review and re-approval of the plan delayed its implementation for four years.

In 2007 the SFBC successfully led a coalition of neighborhood and environmental groups to build support for Healthy Saturdays, the goal of which was to re-establish a car-free weekend day in Golden Gate Park (this event having lapsed since the 1970s). A similar series of events, called Sunday Streets, in which streets were closed in different neighborhoods, was instituted in 2008. Both of these events helped the SFBC develop new advocates for cycling, and even build partnerships with neighborhoods groups that sometimes opposed bicycle projects, in particular, merchants' associations. By 2009 the SFBC had over 10,000 members, and the former 2005 (now 2009) Bicycle Plan was finally approved with its required Environmental Review. The San Francisco Municipal Transportation Agency began constructing the 34 miles of bicycle lanes in August 2010. By early 2011, the SFBC became the largest city-based bicycle advocacy organization in the United States with over 12,000 members. The SFBC's current highest-profile campaign, "Connecting the City", calls for a 100-mile network of three fully traffic-separated bike paths to be constructed by 2020. The paths, called "cycletracks", are intended to be safe enough that anyone "from ages 8 to 80" would feel comfortable cycling on them.

== San Francisco Bike Network ==
The San Francisco Bicycle Coalition's primary goal is a city-wide network of bike lanes, bike paths, or traffic-calmed streets interconnecting every neighborhood in San Francisco. The SFBC states that the whole city will benefit from the bike network due to safer streets, more choices for mobility, less congestion, easier parking, benefits to the local economy, and better health. Ironically, no physical improvements for bicycles could be made to San Francisco's streets from June 2006 until August 2010 due to a full environmental impact report.

The SFBC also supports efforts to improve street maintenance and slow the speed of car traffic, as well as events such as the annual Bike to Work Day. The Bicycle Advisory Committee, which consists of 11 members appointed by the Board of Supervisors, makes recommendations to the board and other public agencies on bicycle transportation projects and policies.

== San Francisco Bicycle Plan ==
In May 2005, the San Francisco Board of Supervisors and Mayor Gavin Newsom unanimously approved the San Francisco Bicycle Plan, which would add bike lanes, require commercial developers to provide bike parking, and outfit Muni buses with bike racks. A June 2006 preliminary injunction stopping all physical improvements for bicycles (including bike lanes, bike parking, and sharrows) was upheld on November 7, 2006, by Superior Court judge Peter Busch pending the completion of a full environmental impact report (EIR). This EIR was finished in June 2009 and certified by the San Francisco Board of Supervisors in August 2009. On August 9, 2010, Mayor Newsom, MTA Board Chairman Tom Nolan, neighborhood groups, and business owners celebrated striping the first new bike lane on Townsend Street.

== Bike to Work Day ==
The San Francisco Bicycle Coalition sponsors the annual Bike to Work Day to encourage commuters to try bicycling as a healthy alternative to driving by organizing groups of cyclists to ride together starting from various neighborhoods, matching new bicycle commuters with more experienced "Bike Buddies", and providing free snacks and coffee at "Energizer Stations" along the busiest bike routes.

In recent years, more elected city officials have participated in Bike to Work Day to show their support for the cycling community. Mayor Ed Lee and Supervisors Eric Mar, Mark Farrell, Julie Christensen, Katy Tang, Jane Kim, and Malia Cohen were among the thousands of cyclists who participated in San Francisco's 21st Annual Bike to Work Day on May 14, 2015.

During the 2015 Bike to Work Day, bicycles made up a majority of street traffic travelling eastbound on Market Street from 8:30 to 9:30, comprising 76% of overall traffic, compared to 54% on Bike to Work Day in 2010. Traffic counts were conducted by Municipal Transportation Agency (MTA) staff.

== Stance on Law Enforcement ==
In 2020, the San Francisco Bicycle Coalition severed formal ties with the police, citing concerns over "racialized police violence." The organization urged member and the public "to consider the potential impact to human life of involving the police in any situation." The Bike Coalition also opposed legislation to ban selling five or more bicycles on the street (by what are often called "chop shops") due to the required police enforcement. As of 2024, the organization is reassessing its stance on the enforcement of bicycle theft laws.

== See also ==
- San Francisco Bicycle Plan
- Cycling in San Francisco
- List of United States bicycle advocacy organizations
