= Bluegogo =

Defunct Chinese bicycle sharing company

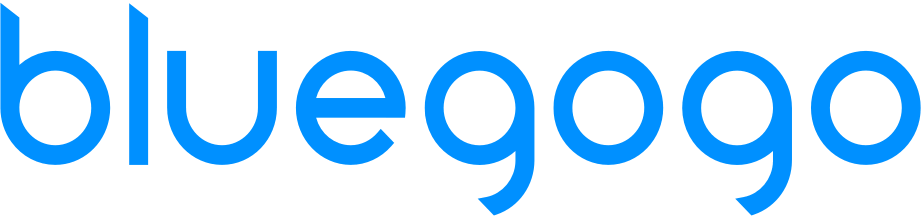

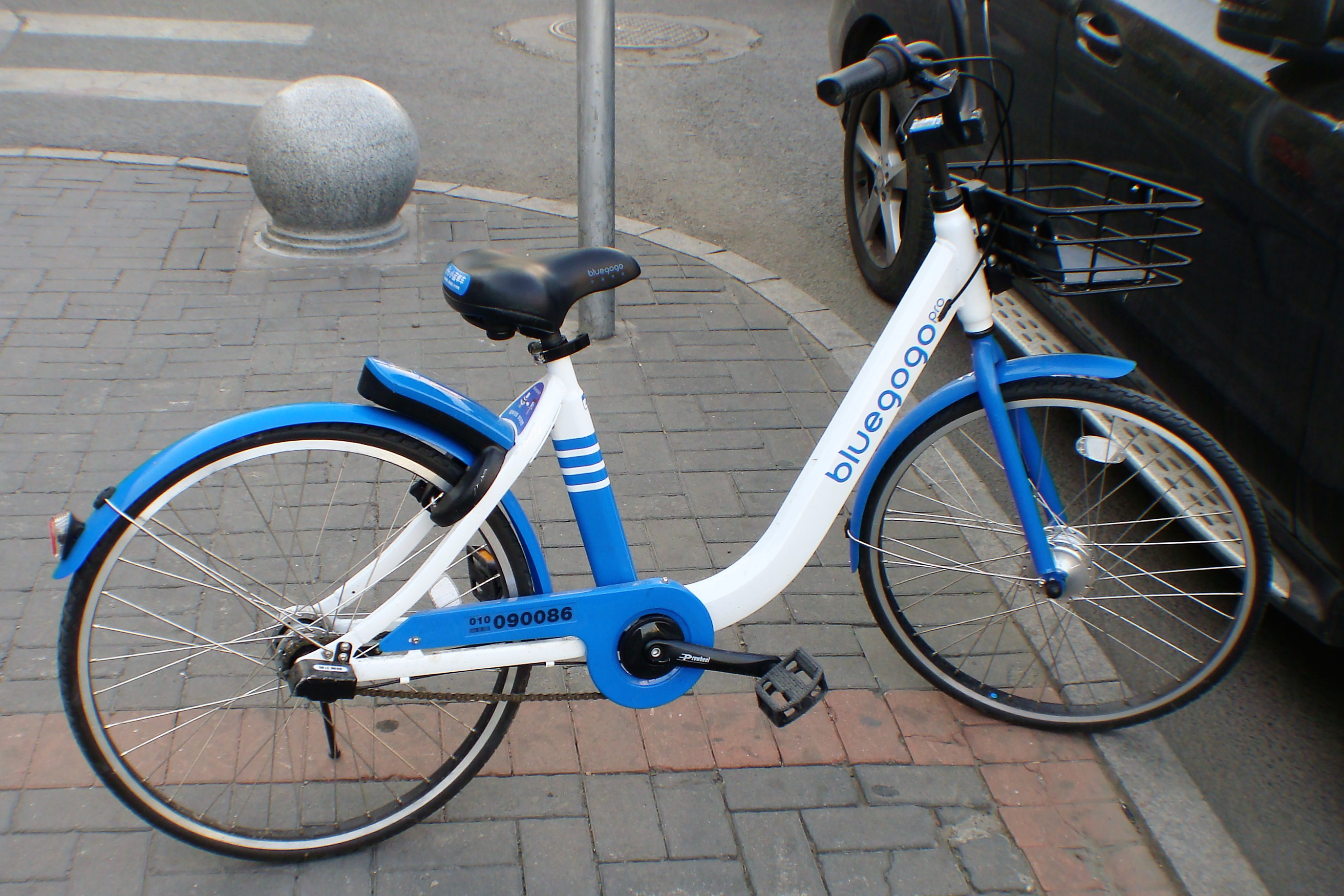
- A Bluegogo bicycle in Beijing, China
- Industry: Transportation
- Founded: November 2016; 10 years ago
- Founder: Gang "Tony" Li (Chinese: 李刚)
- Defunct: November 16, 2017
- Fate: Bankrupted
- Headquarters: Tianjin, China
- Area served: Shenzhen, Guangzhou, Chengdu
- Products: Bicycle-sharing services
- Website: bluegogo.com

Bluegogo
- Simplified Chinese: 小蓝单车
- Traditional Chinese: 小藍單車
- Literal meaning: Little Blue Bike
Transcriptions
Standard Mandarin
- Hanyu Pinyin: Xiǎo lán dānchē

Bluegogo (Chinese: 小蓝单车) was a bicycle-sharing system based in Tianjin, China, founded and owned by Tianjin Luding Technology Co., Ltd (Chinese: 天津鹿鼎科技有限公司). It operated in six Chinese cities, and briefly operated in San Francisco, United States in 2017. The station-less bicycle-sharing system used a mobile app to unlock bicycles. The company went bankrupt in November 2017, and a month later its assets were partly acquired by Didi Chuxing.

== History ==
Bluegogo was founded in November 2016 by Gang "Tony" Li (Chinese: 李刚), the owner of bicycle manufacturer SpeedX, as part of a boom in private bikeshare companies in China led by Mobike and Ofo. The company began operating in Shenzhen and expanded to Guangzhou and Chengdu by January 2017, operating over 70,000 bicycles in total. Bluegogo uses its own bicycle manufacturing plant and raised ¥237 million RMB ($34 million USD) in venture capital. Further expansions in Beijing and Nanjing in early 2017 brought the total number of Chinese cities to six.

In January 2017, Bluegogo announced plans to expand overseas to San Francisco, intending to "disrupt" the bike-sharing industry in the United States. The announcement was met with resistance from local politicians, who objected to the lack of planning and permits for the "dumping of tens of thousands of bicycles" onto city streets. Bluegogo scaled back its rollout plans and sought to cooperate with the city government, which later approved regulations on station-less bicycle-sharing systems to avoid similar problems in the future. After failing to secure commercial permits, Bluegogo suspended its San Francisco operations and took their bicycles off the streets.

According to The Seattle Times, Bluegogo had been discussing a launch in Seattle at the time, along with rival private bicycle-sharing companies Lime and Spin.

On 16 November 2017, Chinese media sources reported that the company had declared bankruptcy and shuttered operations after burning through 600 million yuan (US$119 million) in funds. The bankruptcy was called by analysts as the first sign of a bursting of China's bike-sharing bubble. Green Bike-Transit (Chinese: 拜客出行), a Guangzhou-based company, took over Bluegogo's operations. Many of its users complained on social media that deposits were hard to refund. The Bluegogo app has since been removed from the Apple App Store and Google Play. Their official website has also gone defunct. As of December 2017, the remaining Bluegogo bicycles on the streets can no longer be unlocked and are left abandoned, attracting vandalism and abuse on those uncollected bikes.

Didi Chuxing signed an agreement with Bluegogo to partly acquire the assets of the company in December 2017, expanding Didi's business into the bike-sharing sector. And a number of Bluegogo's former employees have begun working for Didi.
