= National Pedestrian Day =

Indonesian national day

Indonesia's National Pedestrian Day (Indonesian: Hari Pejalan Kaki Nasional) is celebrated annually on January 22 in Indonesia. It is a commemoration of the accident at Tugu Tani Bus Stop, M.I. Ridwan Rais Street, Central Jakarta, on January 22, 2012. A Xenia car crashed onto 13 pedestrians and killed 9 of them. Koalisi Pejalan Kaki (Kopeka) or the Pedestrian Coalition of Indonesia then initiated the commemoration of the date as National Pedestrian Day.

Since then, Koalisi Pejalan Kaki (Kopeka) always stands and contemplates at Tugu Tani Bus Stop every January 22. Over the years, National Pedestrian Day has grown on the discourse and commemoration.
