= Bike-to-Work Day =

Annual event to promote bicycle commuting

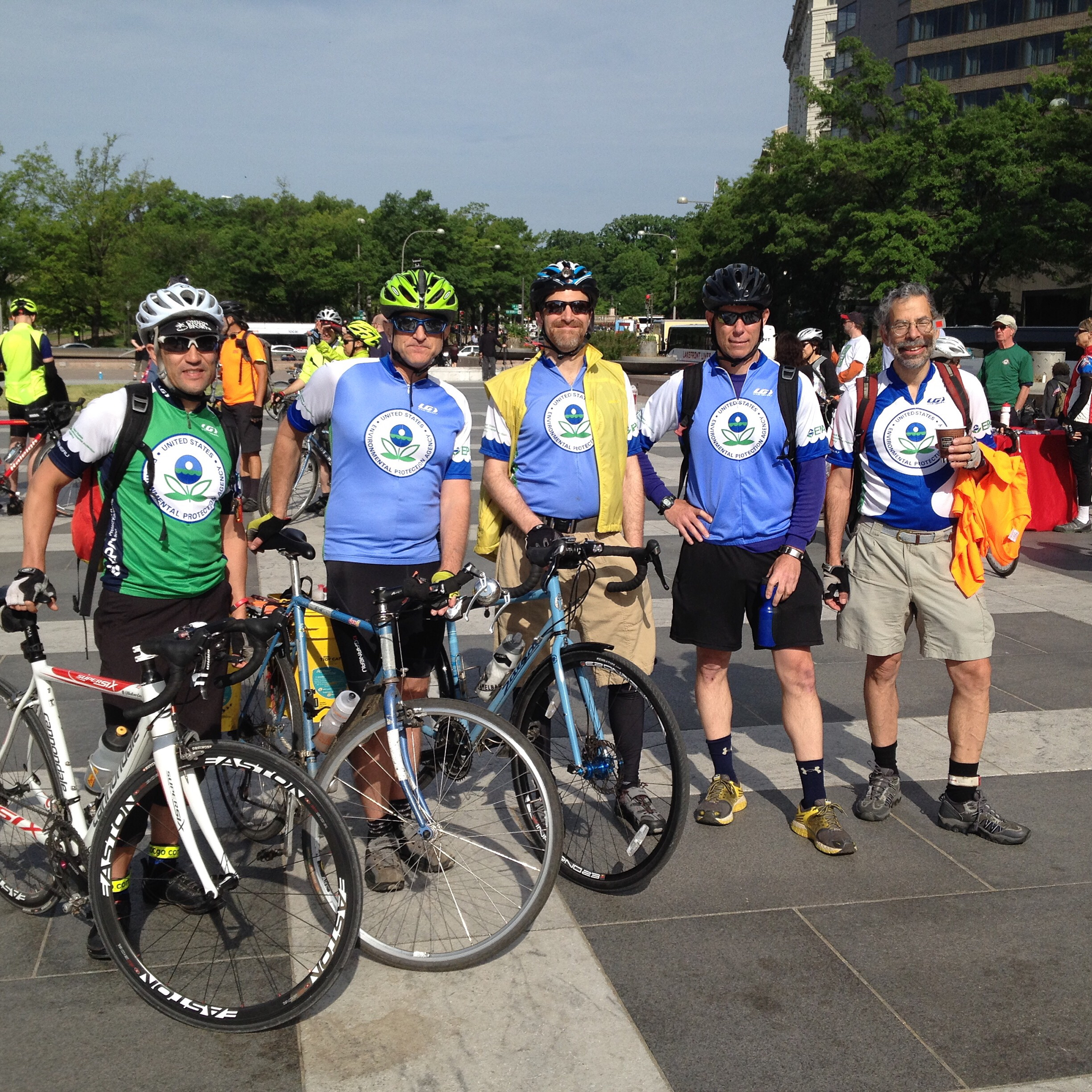
EPA staffers at Bike-to-Work Day in 2016

Bike to Work Day is an annual event that promotes the bicycle as an option for commuting to work (bicycle commuting). It is held in the Spring in a variety of locations including the United States, Canada, Europe and Asia.

Bike Week is the week that includes the Bike-to-Work Day, in May, and the World Bicycle Day, on June 3.

== Origins ==
Bike to Work Day was originated by the League of American Bicyclists and is a part of Bike-to-Work Week, which is in turn part of National Bike Month.

== Activities ==
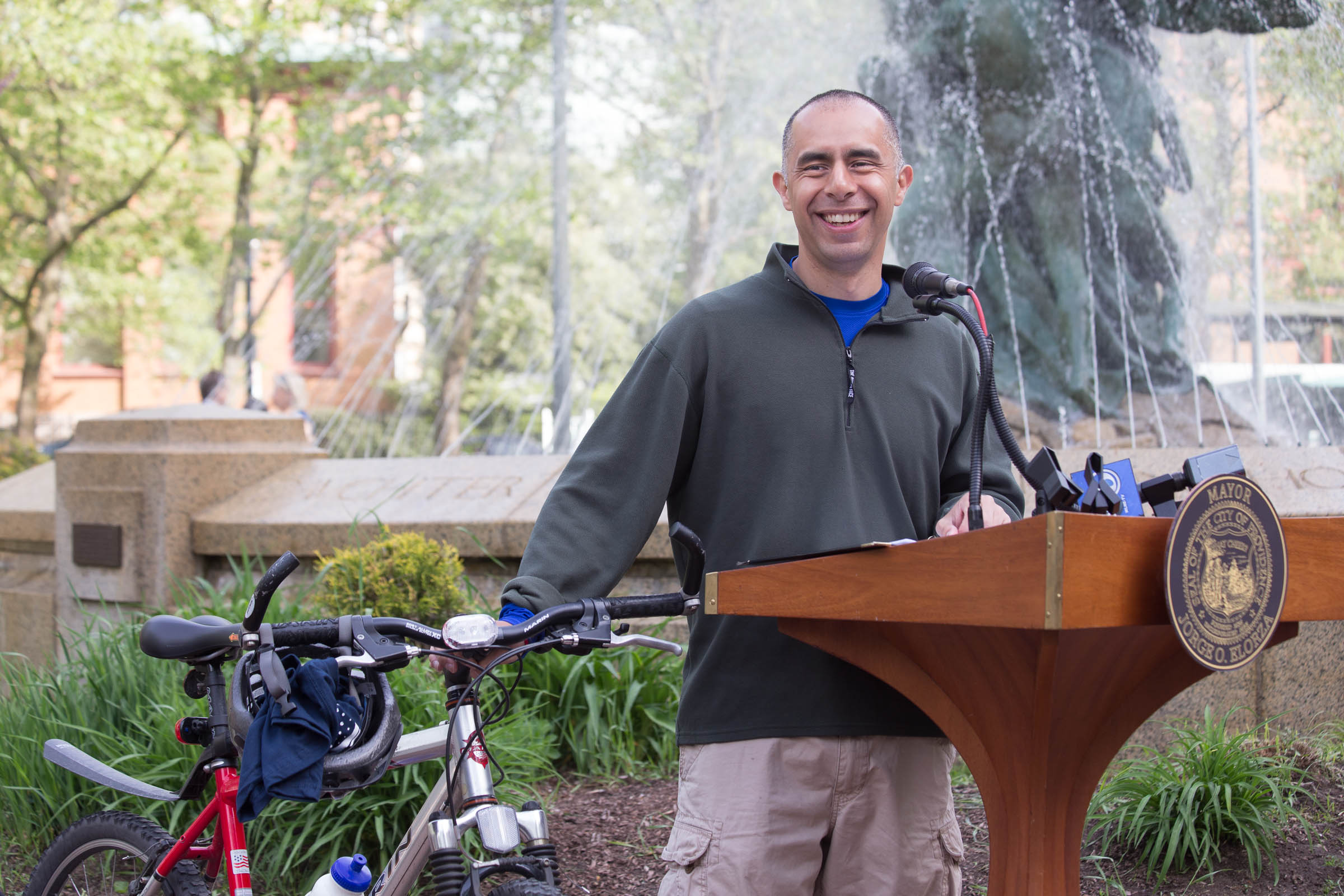
Providence, Rhode Island mayor Jorge Elorza addresses a Bike to Work day gathering in May 2015.

Leading up to Bike to Work Day, national, regional, and local bicycle advocacy groups encourage people to try bicycle commuting as a healthy and safe alternative to driving by providing route information and tips for new bicycle commuters. Further, the American Medical Association has endorsed Bike to Work Day as part of its push to encourage active transportation. The event is supported by many organizations, from local bike shops and restaurants to municipalities and transit authorities. The southern California commuter rail network Metrolink offers free rides to cyclists on Bike to Work day.

On Bike to Work Day, a wide variety of bicycle-related events are organized. The day is a major event in the San Francisco Bay Area, where thousands of residents participate annually, supported by corporate sponsors. Organized "Commuter Convoys," and "Energizer Stations" set up in various locations around the Bay Area providing free food and coffee to bike commuters by organizations such as the San Francisco Bicycle Coalition, East Bay Bicycle Coalition, and Silicon Valley Bicycle Coalition. Members of the San Francisco Board of Supervisors and the Mayor of San Francisco regularly participate, commuting by bicycle to City Hall.

Bike to Work Day also enjoys broad participation throughout the country. Eleven businesses in Boulder, Colorado gave free breakfast to 1,200 participants in 2012 and 1,600 participants in 2013. Bethesda, Maryland used the event to unveil new bike racks (increasing from 200 to 300) and had speeches on transportation. In Kitchener, Ontario, a local bike club, Ziggy's, donated twelve commuter bikes to people who participated and blogged about the event in 2012. Chicago, Illinois gave free tune-ups and balaclavas to participants.

Bike to Work Day is celebrated in Austin, TX by a city-wide offering of free morning fueling stations organized by Ghisallo Cycling Initiative for all commuting cyclists. In 2025, over 40 businesses, organizations and individuals will sponsor fueling stops that range from free coffee and pastries to free bike tune-ups. There are several organized bike rides that are planned by Ghisallo that merge at City Hall where a proclamation is made before cyclists head to work. An after-party is also held that evening to recognize cyclists who participated in riding to work.

== Bike to work day across the world ==
Although the name "Bike to Work Day" originated in the United States, many countries run equivalent campaigns encouraging commuting by bicycle.

In the United Kingdom, Cycle to Work Day is held annually on the first Thursday of August and is promoted by the national cycling charity Cycling UK. Participations are encouraged to ride all or part of their journey to work with campaign guidance stating that riding only part of the way, such as to the nearest train station, still counts.

In Switzerland "bike to work" is a national workplace cycling challenge run by Pro Velo Schweiz each May and June. Employees form teams of four and record the days on which they commute by bicycle; those who ride on at least half their working days enter a prize draw. In 2026, 111,160 participants from 4,072 different companies collectively logged more than 30.6 million kilometres when participating in the challenge.

"Vi cykler til arbejde" ("We cycle to work") is the name of the scheme launched in Denmark by the Danish Cyclists' Federation in 1997 and runs throughout May. Colleagues compete in teams of between two and sixteen to record as many cycling days as possible and winners are drawn by a lot rather than distance.

Germany operates two national campaigns. The first being "Mit dem Rad zur Arbeit" ("By bike to work") is ran jointly by the health insurer AOK and the German cyclists' association and it challenges participants to cycle on twenty days between May and August. Stradtradeln, organised by Klima-Bündnis invites municipalities to choose a 21-day window between May and September during which participants log cycling kilometres for their town. In 2025 more than 1.2 million people from 3,013 municipalities took part and rode 237 million kilometres.

Australia's national ride to work day is held in October and is organised by Bicycle Network, which describes it as the country's largest celebration of commuter cycling. In New Zealand, the Aotearoa Bike Challenge runs throughout February and is organised by the New Zealand Transport Agency in partnership with the behaviour-change platform Love to Ride. Individuals and workplace teams earn points for each ride of at least ten minutes and for encouraging other to sign up, competing within categories based on workplace size. In 2023 more than 23,000 participants from about 3,000 workplaces rode close to four million kilometres.

The Bike to Work Indonesia community (B2W Indonesia) grew out of an informal group of mountain bikers who began campaigning for bicycle commuting in Jakarta in 2004. The community was formally declared on 27 August 2005 at Jakarta City Hall in the presence of the deputy governor, and has since campaigned for cycle lanes and other infrastructure in the capital.

== See also ==
- Bay Area Bike to Work Day
- Bike to Work Week Victoria
- Bike Week (Bicycle Week)
- World Bicycle Day
