= Bike East Bay =

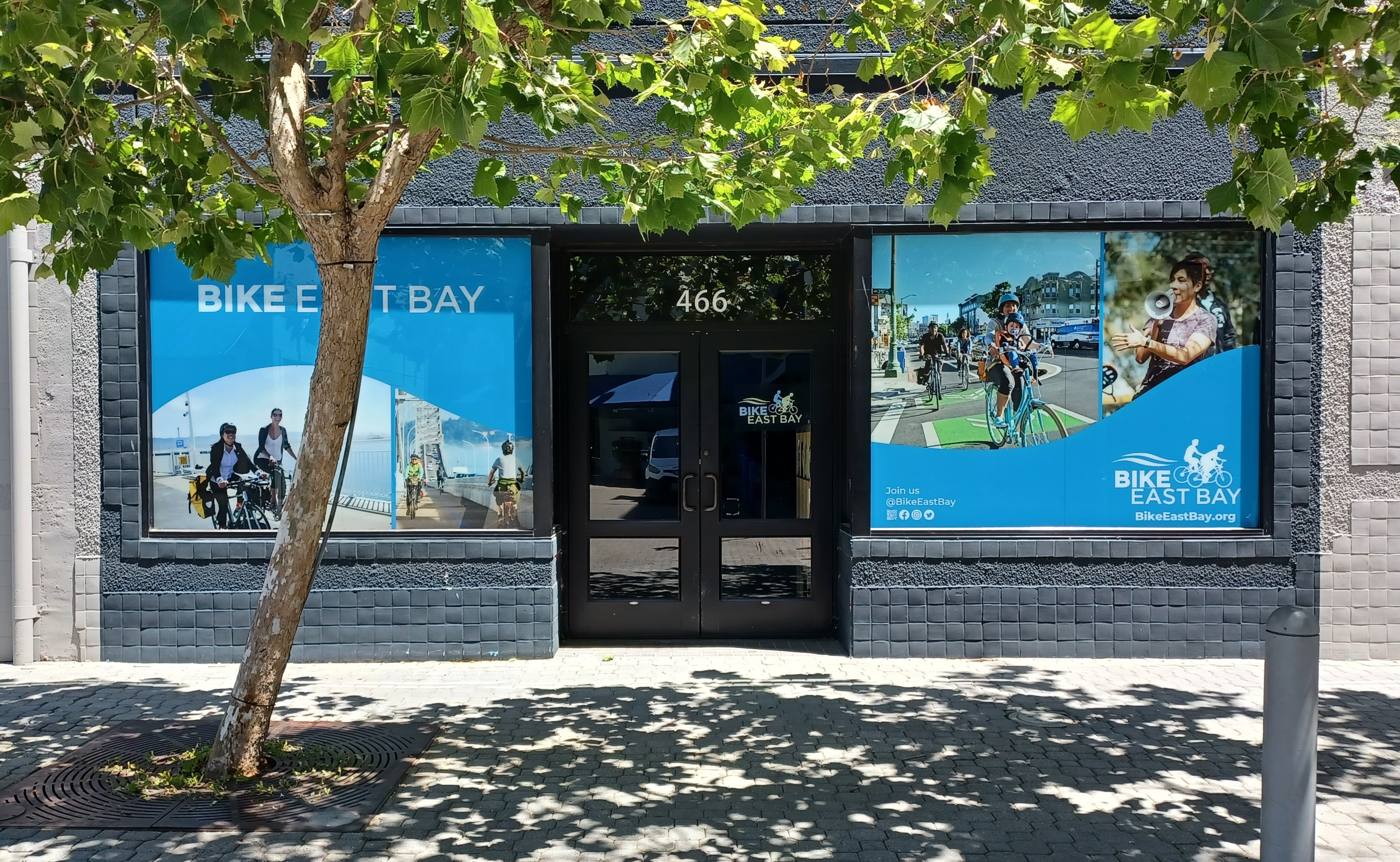
- Formation: 1972; 54 years ago
- Founder: Alexander Zuckermann
- Type: Nonprofit organization
- Headquarters: Oakland
- Location: California, USA
- Region served: East Bay region of San Francisco Bay Area
- Members: over 4000
- Co-Executive Director of People and Operations: Jill Holloway
- Co-Executive Director of Mobility Justice: Justin Hu-Nguyen
- Co-Executive Director of Development and Engagement: Rebecca Saltzman
- Staff: 14 (2026)
- Website: bikeeastbay.org
- Formerly called: East Bay Bicycle Coalition

Bike East Bay, formerly known as East Bay Bicycle Coalition, is a Californian non-profit organization that worked since 1972 toward "promoting bicycling as an everyday means of transportation and recreation" in Alameda and Contra Costa counties of the California's East Bay (part of the San Francisco Bay Area).

== History ==
The coalition was founded in 1972 Alexander Zuckermann, who was among the first to persuade BART to allow bicycles aboard its trains. Zuckerman also lobbied for bike access on the Richmond-San Rafael, Benicia (successfully) and Carquinez (successfully) bridges, among other accomplishments. The bike and pedestrian path on the new eastern span of the Bay Bridge was named after him.

== Membership ==
The coalition now counts over 4000 dues-paying members, plus several thousand members of nineteen affiliated clubs and organizations that are part of the coalition.

== Current campaigns ==
Bike East Bay is developing community liaisons for all 55 cities and municipalities in the East Bay, to include promoting the efforts of bicycle advisory committees in those municipalities; coordinating the annual Bike-to-Work Day in the East Bay; promoting bicycle access on all roads, at all facilities, and on all transit for both sides of the hills; improving BART access and parking; obtaining safe and convenient bicycle parking in downtown areas and other key destinations. Bike East Bay also watchdogs the spending of millions of dollars in transportation and strategic planning funds it has succeeded in allocating for bicycle facilities.

Bike East Bay is currently engaged in joint efforts in Oakland with the East Bay's Cycles of Change organization to establish two Neighborhood Bicycle Centers (NBC's) to serve low income cyclists, one in East Oakland, and another in West Oakland.

Other campaigns include bringing the Bay Area Bike Share program to the East Bay, guiding city bike plans in Berkeley, Concord, Moraga, Hayward and others, asking for more protected bikeways to be built and closing gaps in the bikeway network.

== Outreach ==
=== Bike to Work Day ===
In 1994, following joints efforts with the City of Oakland's Bicycle and Pedestrian Advisory Committee (BPAC), the coalition began celebrating Bike-to-Work Day with a free pancake breakfast at Oakland's City Hall Plaza. Today the event has become an annual celebration on a regional and national scale. In 2014 Bike to Work Day celebrated its 20th birthday. Bike East Bay counted close to 20,000 bike commuters on the day of and organized a pop-up protected bikeway on Telegraph Avenue in Oakland

=== Education ===
Bike East Bay strives to inform both bicyclists and motorists with its Bicycle Safety Quiz, which it has made available online, and in Chinese and Spanish. The organization also supports traffic safety classes in the East Bay which endeavor to educate cyclists on how to drive a bicycle safely and more effectively. The education program offers bike commuting workshops to employers and other groups that wish to foster bicycle commuting to work, errands, and play.

=== Maps and newsletters ===
The organization publishes two East Bay Bicycle Transportation Maps, one covering areas "East of the Hills" and another covering areas "West of the Hills," which planners and activists have used as templates for municipal bike plans in the East Bay.

Members are kept informed of advocacy issues with quarterly issues of "rideOn," the coalition newsletter, each year.

=== Member meetings ===
The coalition holds General Membership Meetings at a variety of public venues in both counties.

=== Pedestrian, bicycling and transit-oriented planning advocacy ===
Bike East Bay has a long history of advocating for broad-based and sustainable transportation and land use planning solutions that also enhance the built environment for pedestrians, cycling and transit riders. The Bike East Bay website links to educational material and activists working toward bus rapid transit, better pedestrian safety and facilities, and smart growth

=== Valet bicycle parking ===
Bike East Bay and its volunteer network across two counties frequently offers free, secure, valet bicycle parking at cultural and civic events throughout the East Bay.

== Public policy accomplishments ==
=== Bicycle accommodation ===
The organization, and its diverse constituencies, have achieved numerous public policy accomplishments over the years in areas of state and local legislation and administrative regulation to include: helping secure $1 billion in funding for the Regional Bicycle Network included in MTC's T2035 Plan; bicycle access on BART trains, all Bay Area ferry services, all East Bay bus systems, as well as bicycle access on Golden Gate Transit buses across the Richmond-San Rafael bridge. Bike East Bay helped implement the Caltrans Bay Area Bridge Bicycle Shuttle and worked to pass Prop 116 funding for Amtrak's Bike-Friendly California Cars on Capitol and San Joaquin trains by 1990. Bike East Bay's calls for "Routine Accommodation" of bicyclists in all transportation projects were adopted by the Metropolitan Transportation Commission a regional planning, financing, and funding government agency in the San Francisco Bay Area which coordinates the transit systems in the area's nine counties.

=== Transportation projects funding ===
In 2014, Bike East Bay campaigned to pass Measure BB, a re-authorization of the previous Measure B. Measure BB, passed November 2014 with 70% of votes, will generate nearly $8 billion over 30 years for essential transportation improvements in every city throughout Alameda County. Of that $8 billion, bikes will get over 10% to fund complete streets, bicycle infrastructure projects and program. Jeff Miller of the Alliance for Biking and Walking said, “This is the biggest financial win of any [bike] organization we know of.”

In 2000, Bike East Bay worked to pass Alameda County Measure B which implemented Alameda County's twenty-year Transportation Expenditure Plan which included a 5% set-aside to fund implementation of the Countywide Bicycle Plan. In 2004, the organization also supported Contra Costa County Measure J, a 1.5% set-aside to fund implementation of Contra Costa County's bike plan. In 2004, Bike East Bay worked to pass the Safe Routes to Transit program as part of the Regional Measure 2 toll increase, to include $20 million in ongoing funding for the program, and later helping to secure an additional $10 million per year for the program in MTC's T2035 Plan.

=== Citizen advisory committees ===
The organization has established citizen-driven Bicycle Advisory Committees in several East Bay cities to review plans and prioritize funding.

== Staff ==
Bike East Bay has a staff that lead advocacy, education and community engagement programs, an executive board, and volunteers and members.
