= World Bicycle Day =

International holiday celebrating the bicycle

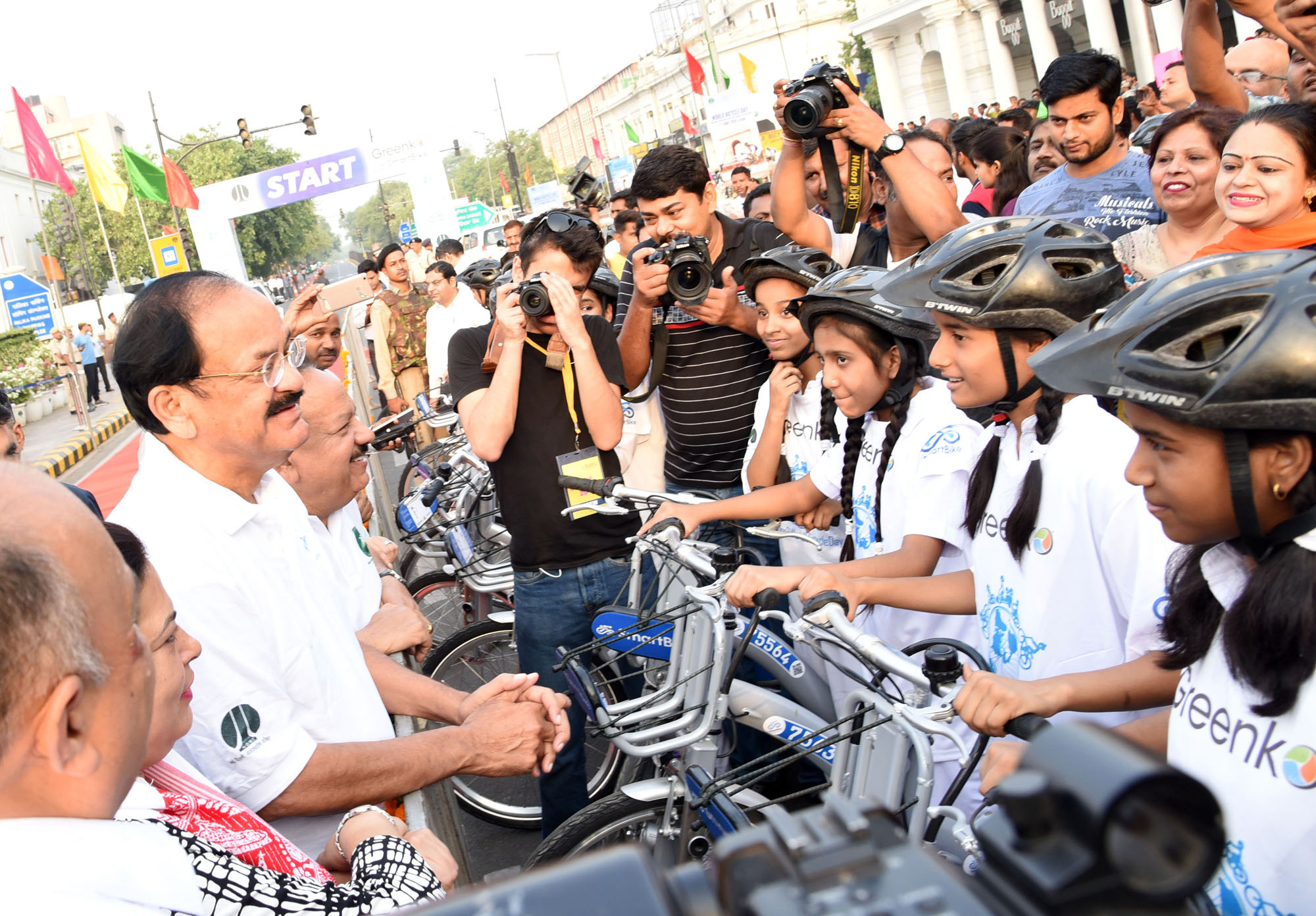
- Bicycle rally on World Bicycle Day 2018, New Delhi
- Observed by: Worldwide
- Type: International
- Significance: Cycling advocacy
- Date: June 3
- Next time: June 3, 2027
- Frequency: Annual
- First time: 2018; 8 years ago
- Started by: Leszek Sibilski; United Nations General Assembly

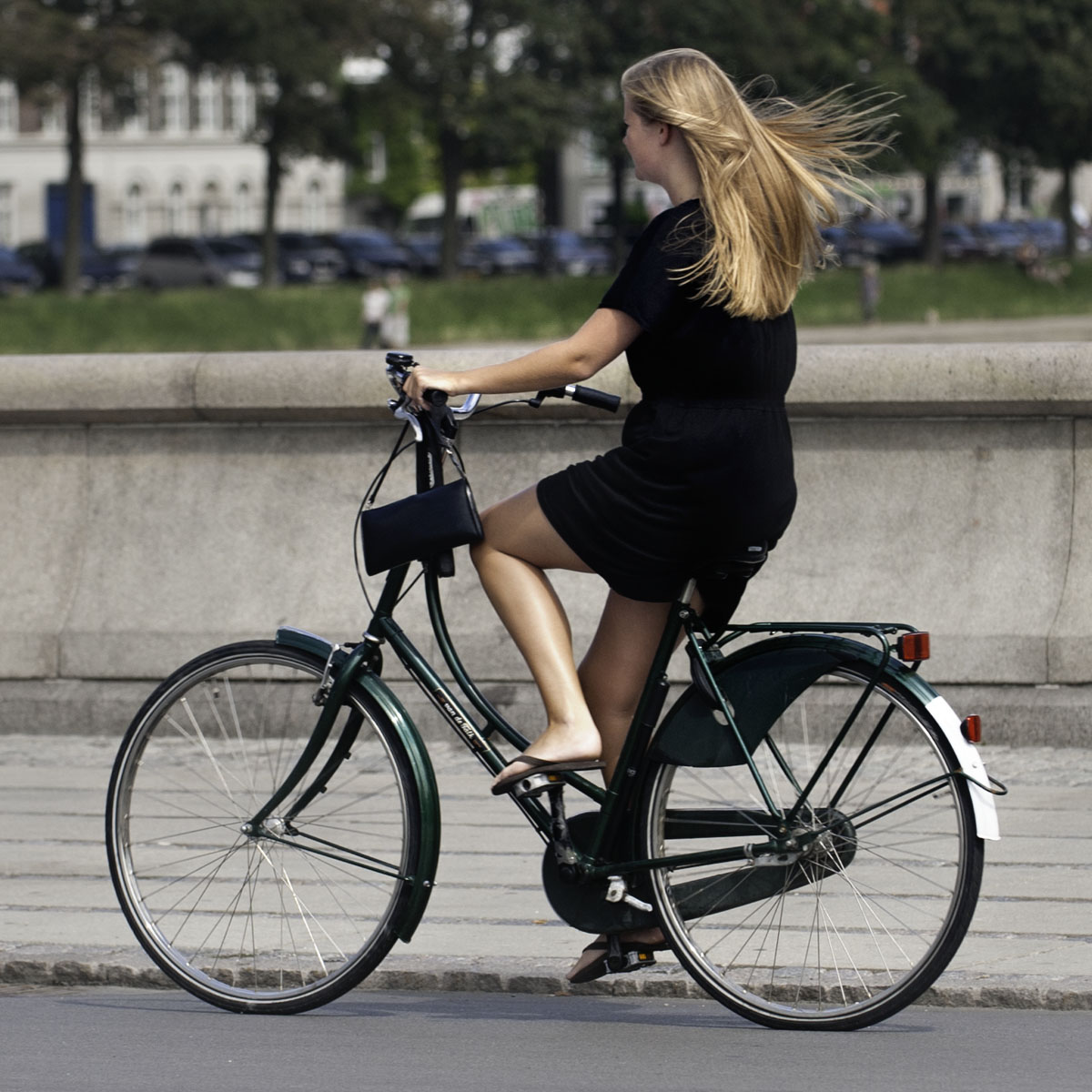
Woman riding bicycle in Copenhagen

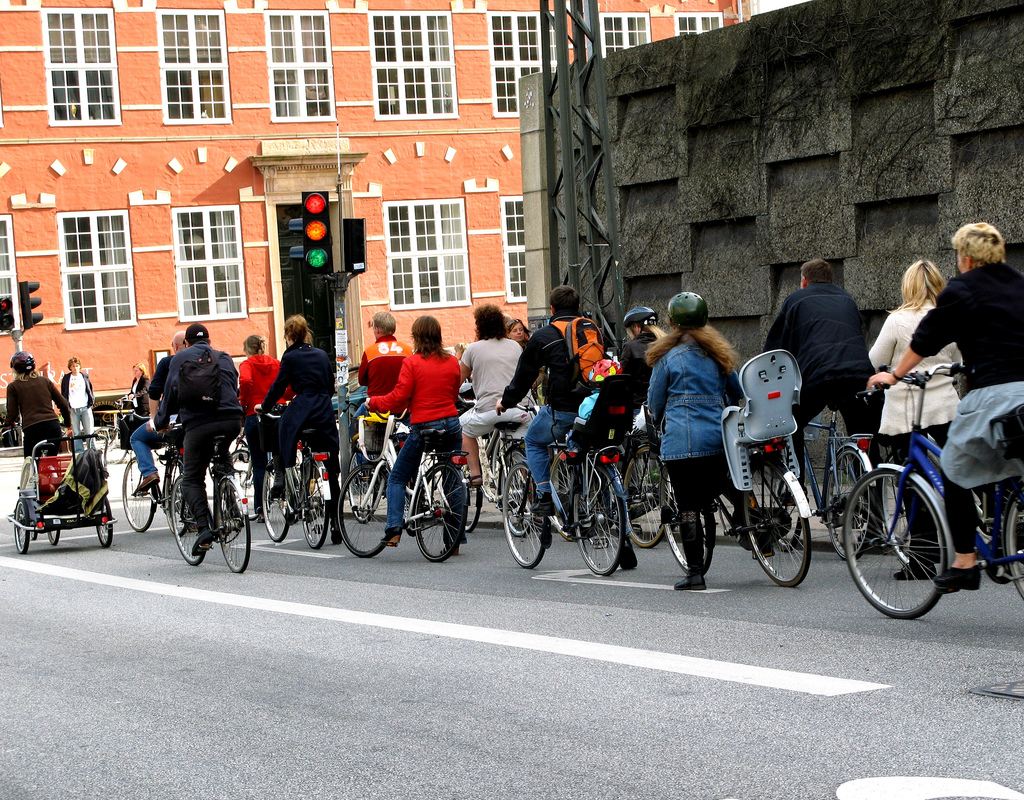
Copenhagen bicycle riders

In April 2018, the United Nations General Assembly declared June 3 as World Bicycle Day. The resolution for World Bicycle Day recognizes "the uniqueness, longevity and versatility of the bicycle, which has been in use for two centuries, and that it is a simple, affordable, reliable, clean and environmentally fit sustainable means of transport."

== Founding ==
Professor Leszek Sibilski (a Polish social scientist working in the United States) led a grassroots campaign with his sociology class to promote a UN Resolution for World Bicycle Day, eventually gaining the support of Turkmenistan and 56 other countries. The original UN Blue and White #June3WorldBicycleDay logo was designed by Isaac Feld and the accompanying animation was done by Professor John E. Swanson. It depicts various bicyclists riding around the globe. At the bottom of the logo is the hashtag #June3WorldBicycleDay. The main message is to show that bicycles belong to and serve all of humanity.

== Significance ==
World Bicycle Day is a special day meant to be enjoyed by all people regardless of any characteristic. The bicycle as a symbol of human progress and advancement "[promotes] tolerance, mutual understanding and respect and [facilitates] social inclusion and a culture of peace." The bicycle further is a "symbol of sustainable transport and conveys a positive message to foster sustainable consumption and production, and has a positive impact on climate."

World Bicycle Day is now being associated with promoting a healthy lifestyle for those with Type 1 and Type 2 diabetes.

== See also ==
- Bicycle Day (disambiguation)
- Cycling advocacy
- List of environmental dates
- Motorist day, car-related observance celebrating the institution of driving
- National Bike Month, United States
