= Biketober =

Month-long festival that celebrates riding a bike

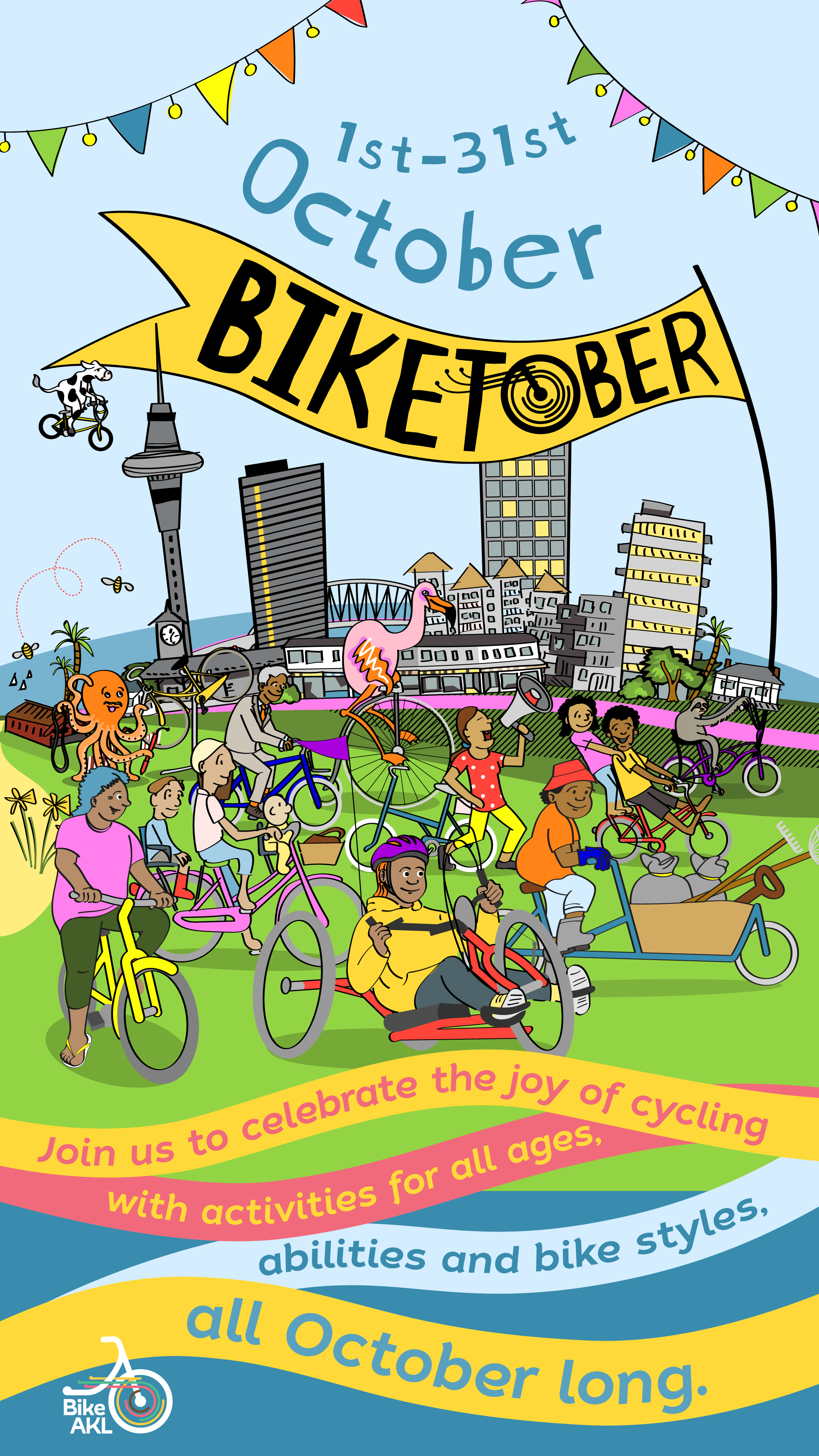
Promotional graphic for Auckland's Biketober festival

Biketober is a month-long festival that celebrates riding a bike.

Biketober takes place in several cities across a number of countries, including Australia and New Zealand.

== Activities ==
Biketober is locally organised and looks different in different locations.

In Aotearoa New Zealand, Biketober is a collection of community-organised activities such as group rides. There is a strong focus on inclusivity and encouraging a wide variety of people to get involved.

Event types include:

- Food tour rides / progressive dinner by bike
- Cargo bike parade
- Pump Track Party
- Halloween Ride
- Sunrise coffee ride
- Big Fancy Bike Ride / Frocks on Bikes
- Murder Mystery Ride
- Zombie Ride
- Treasure Hunt On Wheels
- Books on bikes – a tour of libraries and bookshops
- Bike-in movies / Pedal-powered cinema
- Garden tour by bike
- Bike skills workshops
- Bike-wash
- Bike to school day / Bike Train

In Australia and the US, Biketober has included a challenge where people can win prizes for biking.

Some Biketober festivals have cycling activism elements too.

== List of Biketober festivals ==
- Atlanta Midtown Alliance Biketober
- Biketober Melbourne
- Biketober Auckland
- Southern Lakes Festival of Cycling
- Biketober Christchurch

== See also ==
- Active mobility, unmotorised transport powered by human physical activity
- Bike bus, a regular ride with a group of people following a set route
- Critical Mass, cycling action where many people travel as a group on bicycles
- Kidical Mass, organised bicycle ride highlighting children's right to mobility through cycling
- Pedalpalooza, a months-long cycling festival in Portland, Oregon
- Urbanism, how inhabitants of towns and cities interact with the built environment
