= Kidical Mass =

Organised bicycle ride for children

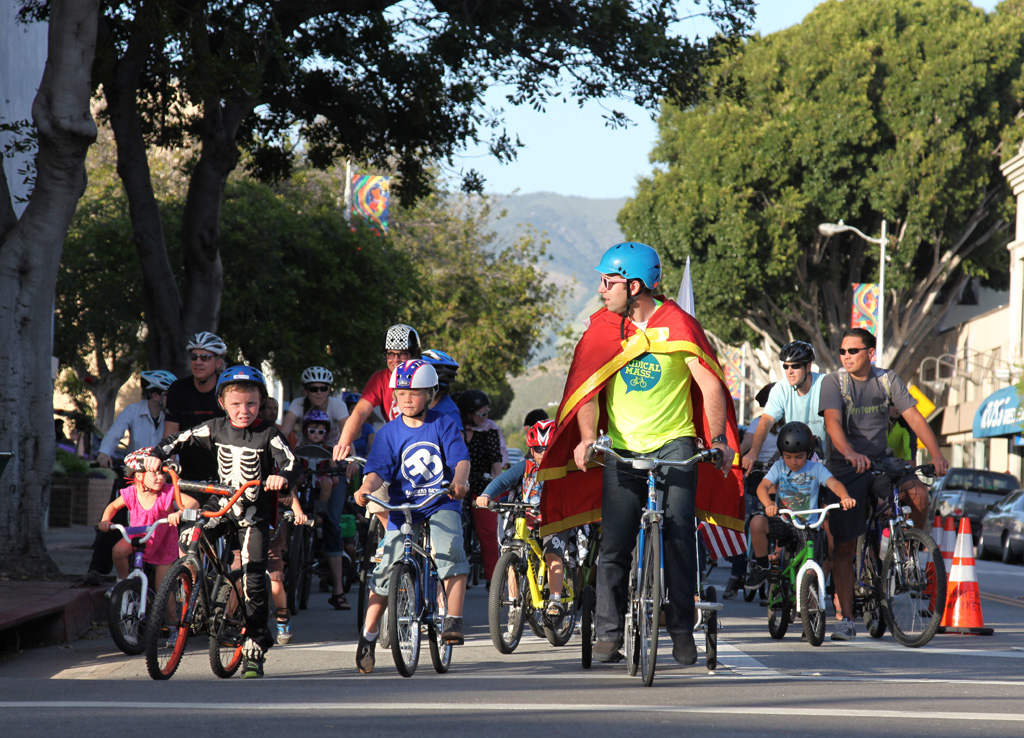
Children and adults riding bicycles on the road during a Kidical Mass event in San Luis Obispo, California

Kidical Mass (sometimes Kiddical Mass) is an organised bicycle ride for children, often using public roads in towns and cities. The rides are free of charge and open to all, with adults acting as safety marshals. Unlike Critical Mass, the route is planned in advance. Rides are usually between 3 and 8 km (2 and 5 mi) long and may have feeder rides to reach the starting point.

== History ==
The name 'Kidical Mass' is a pun on the Critical Mass cycling event and 'kid' meaning 'child'. The name was first used for a ride in Eugene, Oregon which took place 18 April 2008.

Kidical Mass rides now take place in cities around the world. International action weekends take place twice a year, in May and September (the latter around World Car Free Day on 22 September).

== Purpose ==
Kidical Mass rides are an opportunity for children to practise riding on public roads and cycling paths, taking advantage of visibility and safety in numbers. They create awareness of children's mobility rights and promote the idea that kids should be able to go by bike to school or to their leisure activities. While connecting and uniting children and their parents, Kidical Mass rides are often also considered protests calling for safer cycling infrastructure.

== See also ==
- Bike bus, a regular ride with a set route
- Critical Mass, a cycling protest
