= Space Hijackers =

British anarchist group (1999–2014)

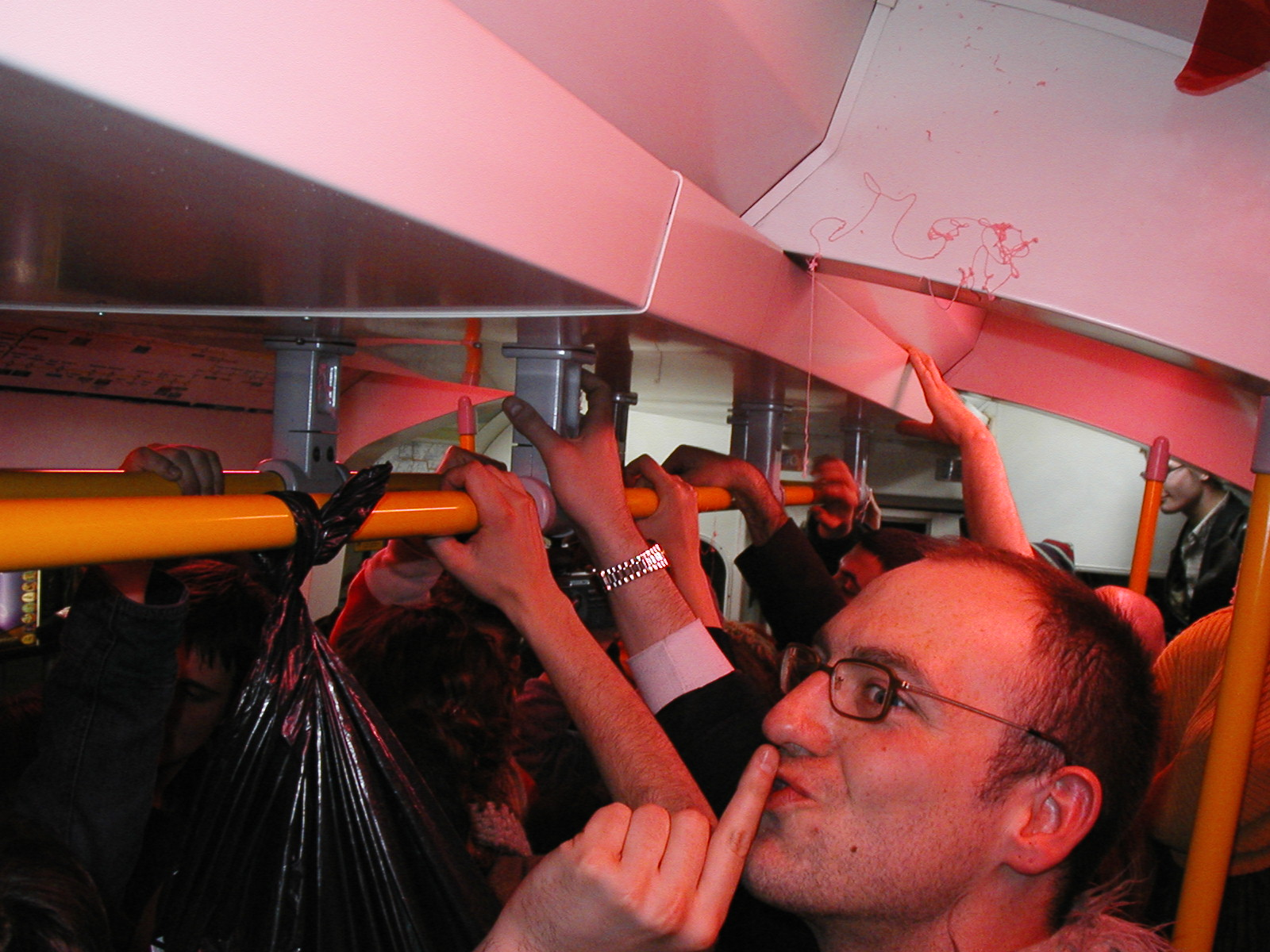
A reveler urges silence on one of the Space Hijacker's Circle line parties on the London Underground on 14 March 2003. The tactic for keeping the party unnoticed by the authorities was to keep quiet while the train was in the stations. The first Space Hijackers Circle Line Party took place on 10 March 1999.

The Space Hijackers was a group based at Limehouse Town Hall in London, active between 1999 and 2014, that defined itself as "an international band of anarchitects who battle to save our streets, towns and cities from the evils of urban planners, architects, multinationals and other hoodlums". Time Out magazine described the group as "an inventive and subversive group of London 'Anarchitects' who specialise in reclaiming public spaces – usually without permission."

The group's activities included "guerrilla benching" — restoring benches that had been recently removed and bolting them to the ground — organising a midnight game of cricket in the centre of the City of London financial district, and satirising the glossy architects' drawings that are displayed on the perimeter of luxury apartments by depicting children's playgrounds and other projects they believe to be actually desirable. Many of these activities aimed to bring to people's attention to the role which corporations play in society in a different light.

== Purpose ==
Space Hijacking is mental graffiti, designed to change how the space is perceived and take some of the power away from the people who own or design the space.

— Space Hijacker Agent Bristly Pioneer

The Space Hijackers existed mainly to change the public's perception of spaces it regularly uses, mainly by staging unexpected events. Their explicit objective was "to effect and change the physical space of architecture", and, eschewing violent protest and other forms of transparent direct action, their methods aimed "to invade and re-brand corporate space". They believed that the use of physical space is becoming more and more politicised, and thus in order to break apart from that politicization they staged events that were typically 'unusual' for that particular space, 'hijacking' it and hoping to change people's perception of the use of that space forever. They believed that increasing politicisation usually leads to increased subordination and discrimination and other forms of domination and control and so Space Hijackers claimed to seek to break down and deconstruct society's notions of space. They sought to effect this by attempting to undermine the authority of the owner's "text", confusing and re-contextualising it and thereby making apparent the possibility of an alternative future. Protests tended to be non-violent and Space Hijacker projects usually involved a good sense of fun. Protest strategy includes involving passers-by.

The Space Hijackers had many contacts with other groups, including but not limited to Critical Mass, Indymedia, Rhythms of Resistance samba band, free media collective iconscious, Reverend Billy and the Church of Stop Shopping and evoLhypergrapHyCx. The Hijackers pulled several of these groups together in Anarchitecture Week 2005, a week of anti-building related activities in response to, and hosted at the same time as Architecture Week.

== Projects ==
Formed in 1999, their first major action was the Circle Line Party, a party on London Underground's Circle Line which attracted around 150 people armed with sound systems, disco lights and bars all disguised as luggage.

We're a bunch of fuck-wits, really. So if we can do this, then you can.

— Agent Robin, quoted in Red Pepper, May 2004 edition.

If you don't look like your average protester, there's less of a barrier to break down.

— Agent Bristly Pioneer, quoted in The Observer, Jan 2008 edition.

Projects of the Space Hijackers included the following:

- Becoming the Official Protestors of the London 2012 Olympics
- Zapatista Army of National Liberation protests
- Spoof Planning Permission Applications
- A Second and Third Circle Line Party
- Inner-City Midnight Cricket
- Mayday Anarchists vs Members of Parliament Cricket
- "arms dealing" at the DSEI arms fair
- Using a parking meter space as a rented office
- 'Supporting' Nike with banners including "Sweatshops ROCK!" at their sponsored events
- 'Auctioning' a tank outside the DSEi weapons exhibition in 2007
- Running a 'professional protest stall' on the London Police march for more pay, with advice for the police on their rights as protesters

=== G-20 London Summit ===
During the 2009 G-20 demonstrations in London, members of the Space Hijackers protest group drove their Alvis Saracen armoured personnel carrier (known to them as "the tank") into the City of London and parked it outside the Royal Bank of Scotland in Bishopsgate. The Saracen, which had been painted bright blue with black and white chequer stripes in a mock police livery, was equipped with CCTV. Eleven Hijackers were arrested and charged on two counts of impersonating police officers. On 27 January 2010, the Crown Prosecution Service dropped all charges against the Space Hijackers because there was "not enough evidence to provide a realistic prospect of conviction". The Space Hijackers won compensation from the police, but their names and biometric data were kept on file for 18 months, allegedly because of a dispute between the Metropolitan Police and the City of London Police.
