= The London Freewheel =

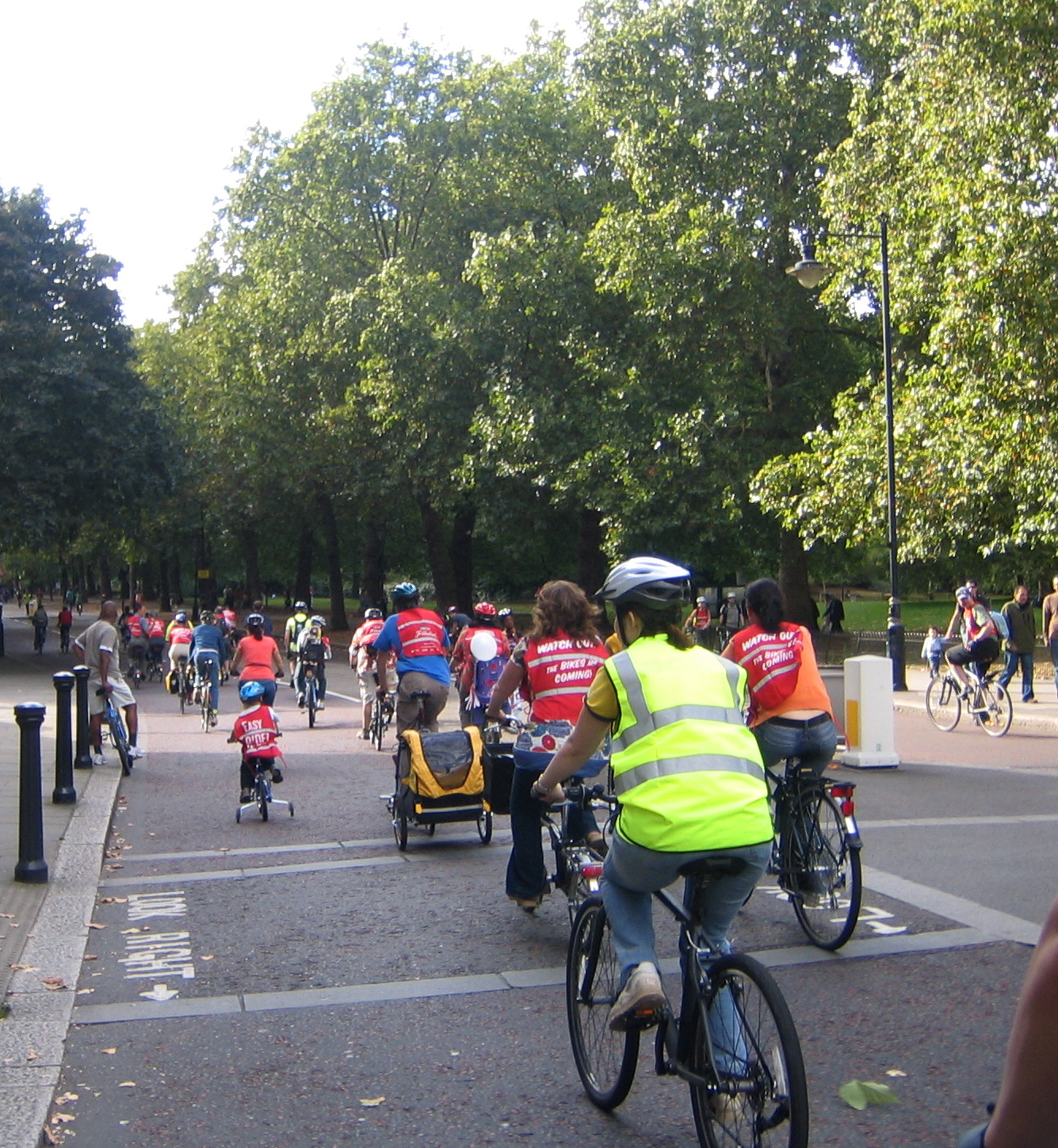
Cyclists of all ages together on the route, passing St. James's Park

The London Freewheel, originally known for sponsorship reasons as the 'Hovis London Freewheel', was developed by the Mayor of London and Transport for London (TfL) to encourage and increase cycling participation, and promote cycling as a form of transport within London. The event was launched at City Hall on 26 June 2007 by the Mayor, Ken Livingstone, Konnie Huq and Tim Dewey, marketing director for the event's sponsor Hovis. Hovis contributed £300,000 out of the total £600,000 raised in commercial sponsorship and support.

== History ==
=== Origins ===
Cycling in London grew by 83% from 2000 to 2007. It was estimated that 40% of Londoners have access to a bike, but only five per cent use one regularly.

The Mayor of London and Transport for London (TfL) increased investment in cycling from £5.5 million in 2000 to £36 million in 2007/08. This money was spent on improved cycle parking facilities, education and training, events and cycle promotion. 500 km of the London Cycle Network Plus – a network of signed routes for cyclists across the capital — had been completed by 2007. TfL also installed 10,000 cycling parking spaces across the capital.

=== 2007–2008: London Freewheel ===
The first major sportive event in London was held in 2007 as the London Freewheel. The London Freewheel was the brainchild of David Love, vice-chair of London Cycling Campaign, inspired by riding in the Cape Argus Cycle Race in 2001.[2] TFL promoted it with the goal of giving more people a chance to discover cycling as both fun and efficient.[1]

The event took place on Sunday 23 September 2007. In 2007, a 14 km route around central London from London Bridge to St. James's Park was closed to motorised traffic, allowing cyclists to take over the streets and enjoy London's most iconic sights. The route took participants past a number of landmarks including the London Eye, Victoria Embankment, Westminster, Whitehall, St Paul's Cathedral, and The Mall. The event was designed for 30,000 cyclists but over 50,000 took part.

As part of the day's cycling experience, there were six ‘Freewheel Hubs' across London where riders gathered to be led by experienced cyclists onto the vehicle-free route. The six borough ‘Freewheel Hubs’ at Gladstone Park – Brent, Finsbury Park – Haringey, Victoria Park – Tower Hamlets, Peckham Rye – Southwark, Clapham Common – Wandsworth, Ravenscourt Park – Hammersmith and Fulham, also offered the chance to have bikes checked by experts.

London Freewheelers could also take part in the Freewheel Festival, an event at St. James's Park open to all participants and visitors. Highlights of the festival included a Hovis picnic, BMX, mountain and trial bike stunts, cycling acrobatics, and bike displays along with children's activities and information on cycling in London.

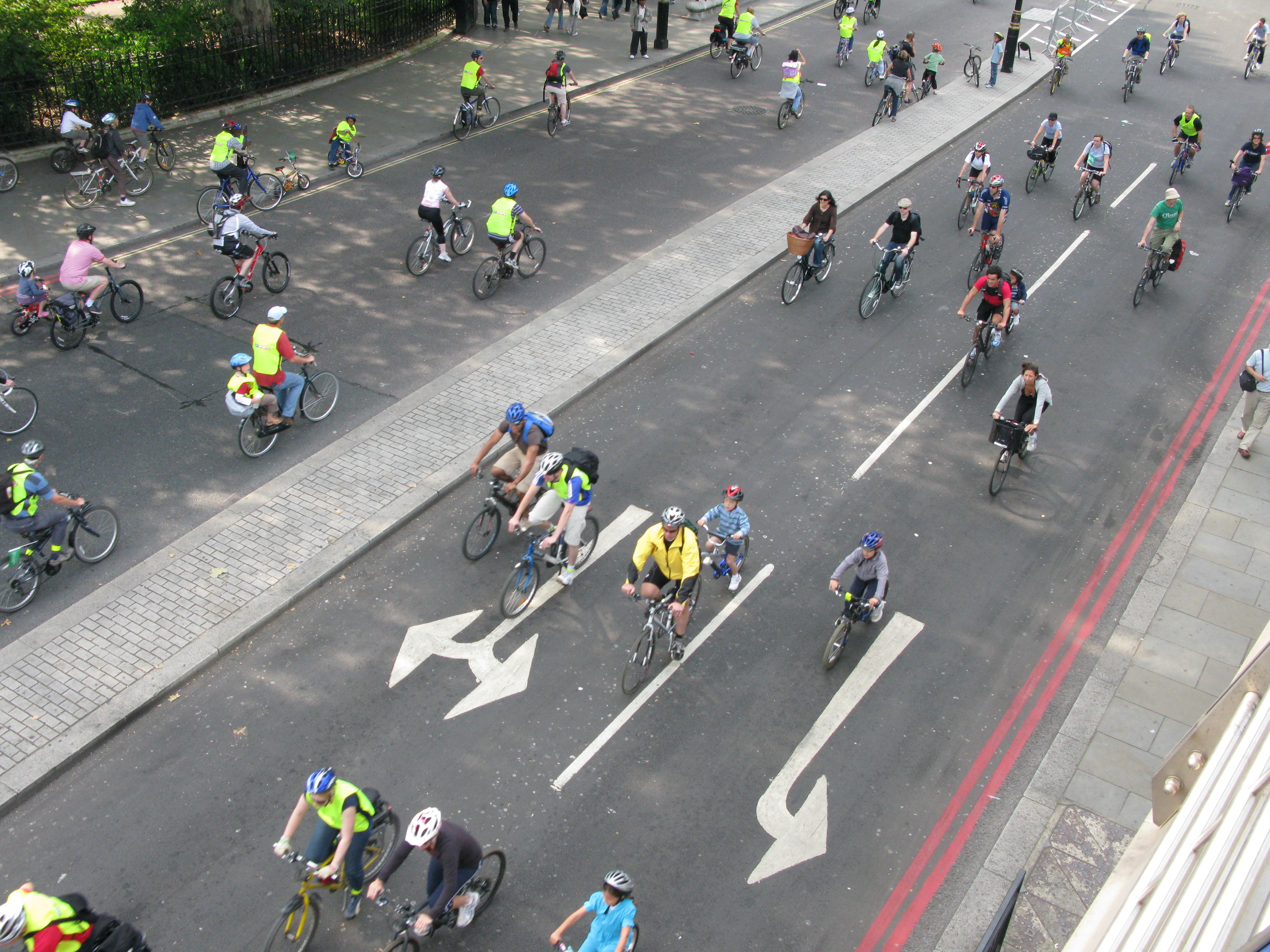
London Freewheel 2008, seen from Hungerford footbridge

Renamed as the Sky London Freewheel, the second edition took place on Sunday 21 September 2008, organised by TfL and the new mayor Boris Johnson, and sponsored by Sky Sports. Sky contributed £100,000 out of the total £780,000 raised in commercial sponsorship and support.

The 2008 event was announced as accommodating 100,000, but this was later scaled back to 45,000. Organisers estimated that 50,000 took part.

A different route, 12 km in length, between the Tower of London and Buckingham Palace, was again closed to motor vehicles all day (between 09:30 and 16:30) and open to cycles. Local 'hubs' at the Emirates Stadium in Islington, Victoria Park, Clapham Common and Ravenscourt Park provided meeting points and guided rides to the event.

=== 2009–2011: Mayor of London Sky Ride ===
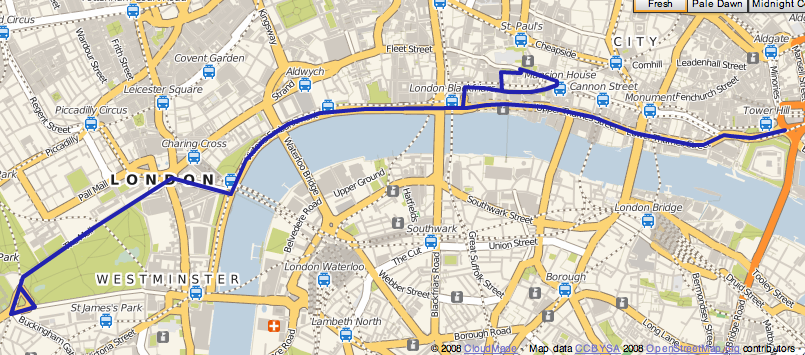
Map of the 2009 route

In 2009 the event was renamed from London Freewheel to the Mayor of London's Skyride following a multi-year sponsorship deal between Sky Sports and the Mayor of London.

The Mayor announced in October 2008 that the central route would again be reviewed, considering opportunities for including part of the 2012 Summer Olympics cycling road race course or the 2009 Tour of Britain route. He also planned to work with outer London boroughs to host their own Freewheel events.

The first local event in outer London was held in Hounslow on Sunday 9 August; about 11,000 cyclists taking part. Other Skyride events took place the same month in Manchester, Glasgow and Leicester.

The renamed 2009 Mayor of London's Skyride took place on 20 September, along a 15 km route including a loop through the city. A record 65,000 took part. 3,500 joined 55 guided feeder rides from the suburbs, organised by the London Cycling Campaign.

In January 2010, the Mayor and TFL announced plans to increase the motor-traffic-free events to three Sky Rides, including two unnamed outer London boroughs.

On 25 May, Sky Ride announced its programme of City Rides for 2010, with twelve rides in ten cities, including the Mayor of London's Sky Ride Ealing on 18 July 2010, the Mayor of London's Sky Ride Redbridge on 15 August 2010 and the main Mayor of London's Sky Ride on 5 September 2010. On 31 August, Kelly Brook (as "Sky Ride Ambassador") joined Boris Johnson to launch the event.

A new record of 80,000 cyclists took part in 2011.

=== 2012: Hiatus ===
There wasn't an event in 2012 to allow for the holding of the Olympic and Paralympic Games. The road cycling events of the Olympic Games proved exceptionally popular, with many thousands of spectators along the lengths of the courses.

=== 2013: RideLondon ===
In 2013 SkyRide was discontinued as the Mayor backed a new event called RideLondon. It was developed to include a larger cycling series of events including the Prudential RideLondon-Surrey 100, the aim being to create the largest cycling event in Britain, aimed at cyclists of every age and ability. The event pointedly drew inspiration for the mass participation London Marathon events for runners. The route for both amateurs and professionals followed closely, but with a minor diversion, avoiding Richmond Hill, the road race of the Olympics.

The events incorporated the Prudential RideLondon FreeCycle, an eight-mile loop around central London following a similar route to previous Skyride events and open to the public.

RideLondon featured a 100-mile ride open to all clubs and amateurs and a 'Grand Prix' event for ranked professional female cyclists. These were run under competition rules and required helmets to be worn.

For its UCI-rated event (at 1.1) as a one-day, top tier event respectively denoting the numbers, effectively in 2013 the London-Surrey Cycle Classic returned following its conversion the previous year into the Olympic road race. Once again, this set the number of UCI Europe Tour events in Britain up one, to three over the whole year-long season.

== London-Surrey Cycle Classic ==
Although first held in 2013, two races (similar in their route) were held in previous years; in 2011 a 'London Prepares' test event, the London–Surrey Cycle Classic, tested the course for the purposes of the following years Olympic road race; the event was won by Mark Cavendish. No women's event was held, a decision criticised by many.

In 2012 the Olympic road races were held over broadly similar courses, with additional loops of Box Hill. The men's event was won by Alexander Vinokourov from Rigoberto Urán. The women's event, held the following day was won by Marianne Vos from Lizzie Armitstead.

In 2013, the Classic returned as an annual event, within the rebranded RideLondon event, as part of the 2013 UCI Europe Tour. The first edition of the rebranded event was won by Arnaud Démare of FDJ (cycling team). The event attracted 25 teams with 148 entrants, of which 131 finished. the numbers, effectively in 2013 the London-Surrey Cycle Classic returned following its conversion the previous year into the Olympic road race. Once again, this set the number of UCI Europe Tour events in Britain up one, to three over the whole year-long season.
