= Circle line party =

Type of subway party

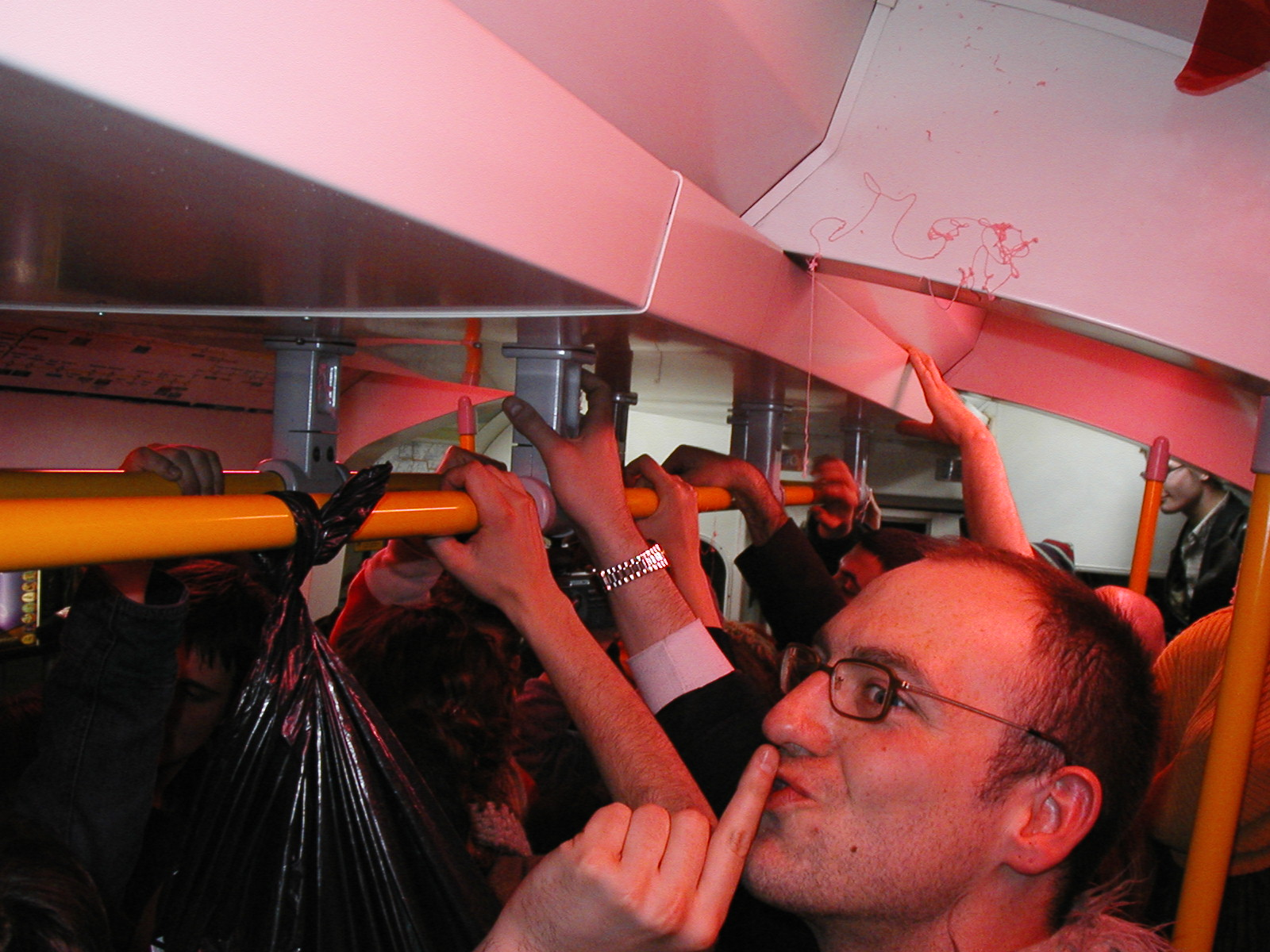
A reveler urges silence in anticipation of the second Circle line party on 14 March 2003

A Circle line party is a type of subway party occasionally held on the Circle line of the London Underground.

== Description ==
Although the time and place of these parties is planned, the event itself occurs spontaneously, as each participant decides for themselves what sort of revelry, costume, decorations, snacks, libations and guests to bring to the party. The participants decorate the carriages festively, and play music, either live or on portable sound systems, disguised to appear as normal luggage.

Other activities include setting up pole-dancing poles on the trains. Free drinks, snacks and sweets are provided, often being provided from well-stocked portable bars and snack tables, which disappear as the train arrives at the station. Commuters are invited to participate in the parties.

To maintain a low profile while the trains are in the stations, most participants only revel and frolic once the trains are in tunnels. Permission is not sought from London Underground or the British Transport Police for Circle line parties, and police sometimes stop trains for long periods to break the parties up. However, their organisers, typically linked to anarchist groups such as the Space Hijackers, claim that Circle line parties are not meant to disrupt travel, but to "reclaim the public space from the advertisers and give it back to the people to whom it belongs".

=== May 2008 party ===
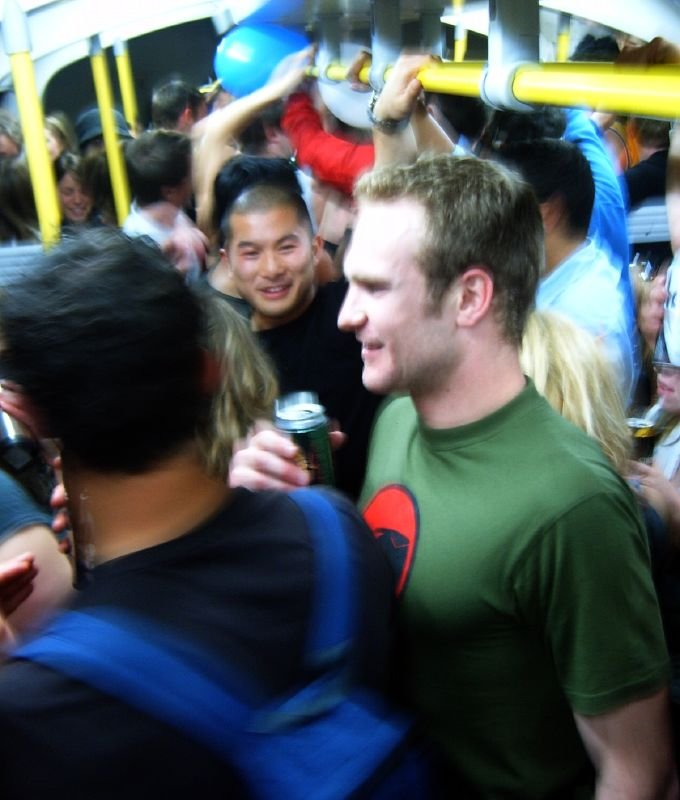
Thousands celebrate the last night of legal drinking on the Underground in May 2008

On 7 May 2008, the newly elected Mayor of London Boris Johnson announced that the drinking of alcohol would be banned on all public transport services run by Transport for London from 1 June. Three independent Facebook groups were set up to organise another Circle line party to celebrate the last night of legal drinking on the London Underground, who quickly merged into one event called "Last Orders On The Underground". The plan quickly received media attention and was mentioned in several newspapers.

On 31 May, the night itself, thousands of people attended, the largest Circle line party ever. Some dressed in costumes ranging from 1920s prohibition figures to Boris Johnson himself. The line was suspended after several trains were damaged during the party, and a number of London Underground staff and police officers were assaulted. Seventeen people were arrested due to disorderly behaviour and six tube stations were closed as they became overcrowded.
