= Cardboard Tube Fighting League =

The Cardboard Tube
- Formation: July 22, 2007
- Purpose: To get people to play more.
- Headquarters: Los Angeles, CA
- Location: San Francisco, U.S.A., Seattle, U.S.A., Sydney, Australia.
- Leader: Robert Easley
- Main organ: Robert Easley, Dan Gilmore, Colin Knight, Ravin Pierre.
- Website: http://www.tubeduel.com

The Cardboard Tube Fighting League (CTFL) is a global organization that hosts cardboard tube based events in Seattle, Washington; San Francisco, California; and Sydney, Australia. The CTFL hosts tournaments and battles where cardboard tube fighters go head-to-head in an attempt to break their opponent's tube without breaking their own. The events also focus on cardboard costumes and theatrics. These events are often held at public parks throughout the summer, are open to everyone ages 5 and up, and emphasize fun over competition. Cardboard tubes are provided and all events are free for participants.

== History ==
The CTFL was started by Robert Easley in Seattle, Washington. Robert had childhood memories of hitting friends and family with cardboard tubes in mock sword fights. He came up with the idea of starting regular tournaments around the act of cardboard tube fighting. This idea comes from three core beliefs:

- People need more ways to play and take themselves less seriously.
- Events can be fun without alcohol.
- Cardboard sword fighting is fun.

The CTFL conformed to these guidelines. After two months of planning, the first event was held in Seattle at Gas Works Park on July 22, 2007. The tournament had been the "pick of the week" in a local publication called The Stranger. The Stranger is credited as being the driving force behind the early adoption of the CTFL by the public. This led to a number of blog posts and radio interviews. The first event drew over 40 people and was described as "fun" by a majority of those who attended. For the remainder of the summer, events were held in Seattle. During this time, the league started battles: two groups dueling until one team no longer had any usable tubes. By the end of the summer of 2007, the CTFL spread to San Francisco; by the end of the summer of 2008, CTFL spread to Sydney, Australia. Also, Newmindspace put on a 1200 cardboard tube lightsaber jedi battle.

== Active Branches ==
Cardboard Tube Fighting League Seattle, USA

Started on July 22, 2007, by Robert Rieuall CTFL events are held at Gas Works Park in Seattle, Washington. The Seattle chapter is now run collectively by Colin Knight and Ravin Pierre. Events continue during the summer and usually range between 30 and 50 participants. Regulation tubes are generally 1.5 inches in diameter, 36 inches in length, and .045mm thick.

Cardboard Tube Fighting League San Francisco, USA

Started on October 28, 2007, by Robert Easley. Events are held throughout the summer and usually range between 40 and 64 participants. Regulation tubes are generally 1.5 inches in diameter, 36 inches in length, and .045mm thick. The San Francisco branch of the CTFL was the first to incorporate a children's league into the tournament.

Cardboard Tube Fighting League Sydney, Australia

Started on April 5, 2008, by Dan Gilmore, the first event gained worldwide attention and attracted large numbers of participants.

Washington DC

According to Wonkette, a DC gossip blog, a Cardboard Tube Fighting Tournament was held in Washington DC at the National Mall on July 26, 2008, by Ravin Pierre. The DC did not have an active branch at this time.

Cardboard Tube Fighting League Bristol, UK

This fledgling but enthusiastic cadre of cardboard cavaliers was begun on January 7, 2009.

Cardboard Tube Fighting League Belgium

Guerrilla Cardboard Ninja Troops. Founded by accident by Diepmassief end of 2008. Later gained the official recognition on 24/10/2010 by Robert of founding chapter CTFL Seattle.

== Event Types ==
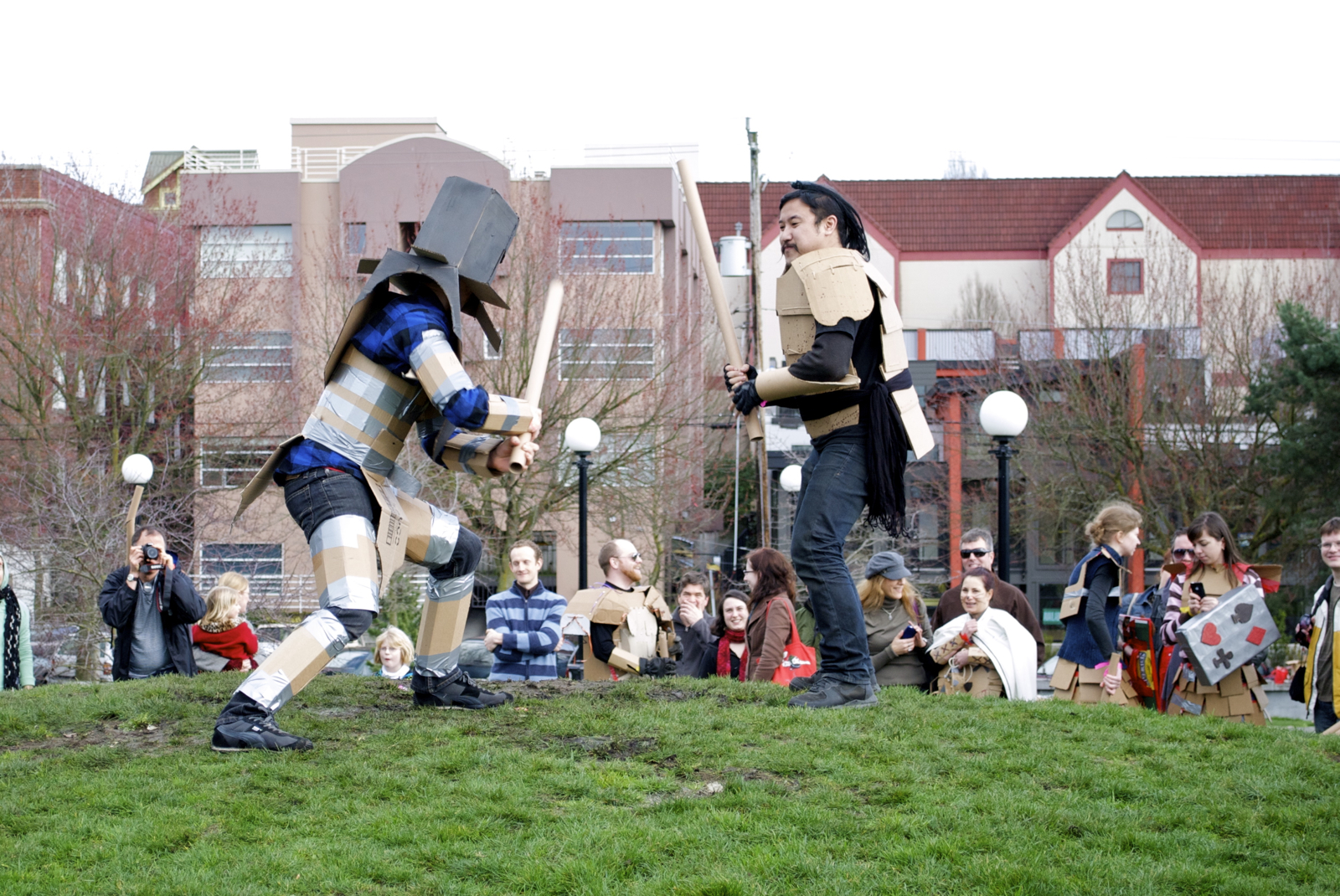
Two participants battling it out.

Tournament

CTFL tournaments generally range between 24 and 64 participants and have a multi-stage tournament structure. During the first and second rounds, participants must use the same tube. After the second round, new tubes are issued. Sometimes tournament organizers participate to even out the number of participants. Also, three-person chaos bouts are not uncommon. Tournaments can run anywhere from 30 minutes to several hours.

Battle

A CTFL battle is different from a tournament because there is only a shared victory. Participants are given tubes and colored markers designating their team. When the battle begins, participants attempt to break the opposing team's tubes. In a battle, a tube is considered broken if it is completely unraveled or severed completely. The last team with intact tubes win. Cardboard armor is allowed in battles and participants with the best costumes are rewarded with prizes. Sometimes CTFL battles are accompanied by live music in the form of bagpipes.

== Rules ==
The CTFL focuses on keeping rules simple so that events are as low barrier as possible. The commonly observed rules in the CTFL are:

1. Don't break your tube. In a duel, the last person with an unbroken tube is the winner. In the event that both participants break their tubes at the same time, both duelists are considered losers. A tube is considered broken when it is held horizontal and the tip drops to an angle greater than 45 degrees or it is completely detached from the rest of the tube.
2. Attacking until the other combatant is knocked out, or dead. No stabbing. No weapons.
3. No stabbing. Lunges involving tubes are not allowed under any circumstances. Participants who exhibit this behavior will be ejected from the event.
4. Do not attack the opponent's face. Hitting the face is heavily frowned upon and can force ejection from the event.
5. Once a tube is broken, fighting must cease.
6. Only official CTFL tubes are allowed. These tubes are provided at the events.
7. No blocking of opponent's tube other than with your own tube.
8. Tubes must always be held near the end. Participants may switch ends as they see fit. Holding tubes in the middle is illegal.
9. Shields are banned in tournaments.
10. All participants must sign a waiver.

== Prizes ==
The CTFL offers "Legendary Cardboard Tubes" as prizes for their tournaments. These tubes are often associated with a historical or mythical weapon. Some prizes of note include: Thor's Hammer, d'Artagnan's Saber, Heaven's Will, and the Suffusca Mors. At times, the CTFL has also offered official T-shirts with the slogan "training elite militias of cardboard tube wielding ninjas". A large majority of participants have claimed CTFL grand prizes.
