= Newmindspace =

Former urban arts collective

Newmindspace was a New York- and Toronto-based urban arts collective founded in 2005 by Lori Kufner and Kevin Bracken and last active in 2016. The pair organized free, monthly events in cities throughout North America. Using a mailing list and their website newmindspace.com to communicate with their community, Newmindspace hosted all-ages events that generally attracted teenagers, twentysomethings and people in their early 30s. Their events inspired other groups to undertake similar projects in cities around the world.

== Events ==
- Subway Parties
- Urban Capture the Flag
- Public pillow fights
- Bubble battles, where hundreds participants use bubble toys simultaneously
- Massive (2 km+) murals
- Blacklight-lit cardboard tube fighting Lightsaber battles

== Ideology and inspiration ==
Newmindspace was loosely connected to the Toronto Public Space Committee, and considered reclaiming public space the most important goal of their activities. They also claimed they are committed to "inventing new ways of having fun", pointing out that most cities lack free, quality entertainment for young people. Other events, such as their urban easter egg hunts or Night Lights, were intended to be public art installations modeled after the works of Christo and Jeanne-Claude.

== Sources ==
- McGinn, Dave. "Don't stop the guerilla party train". Dose magazine, 18 Aug 2005.
- Lazarovic, Sarah. "Revelers See Stars at Underground Celebration". The Globe and Mail, 16 Aug 2005.
- "Subway parties". CBC's The Hour with George Stroumboulopoulos, 12 Dec 2005.
- "Space Invaders". National Post, 4 Nov 2006.
- "Reclaim the City, One Party at a Time". National Post, 21 Jan 2006.
- "(Pillow) Fight Club". New York Times, 18 Feb 2006.
- "Shiny Happy People". University of Toronto Magazine, 1 Sep 2006.
- "Newmindspace Puts Stars in the Sky". Now Magazine, 16 Nov 2006.
