= Peloton =

Main group of bicycle riders

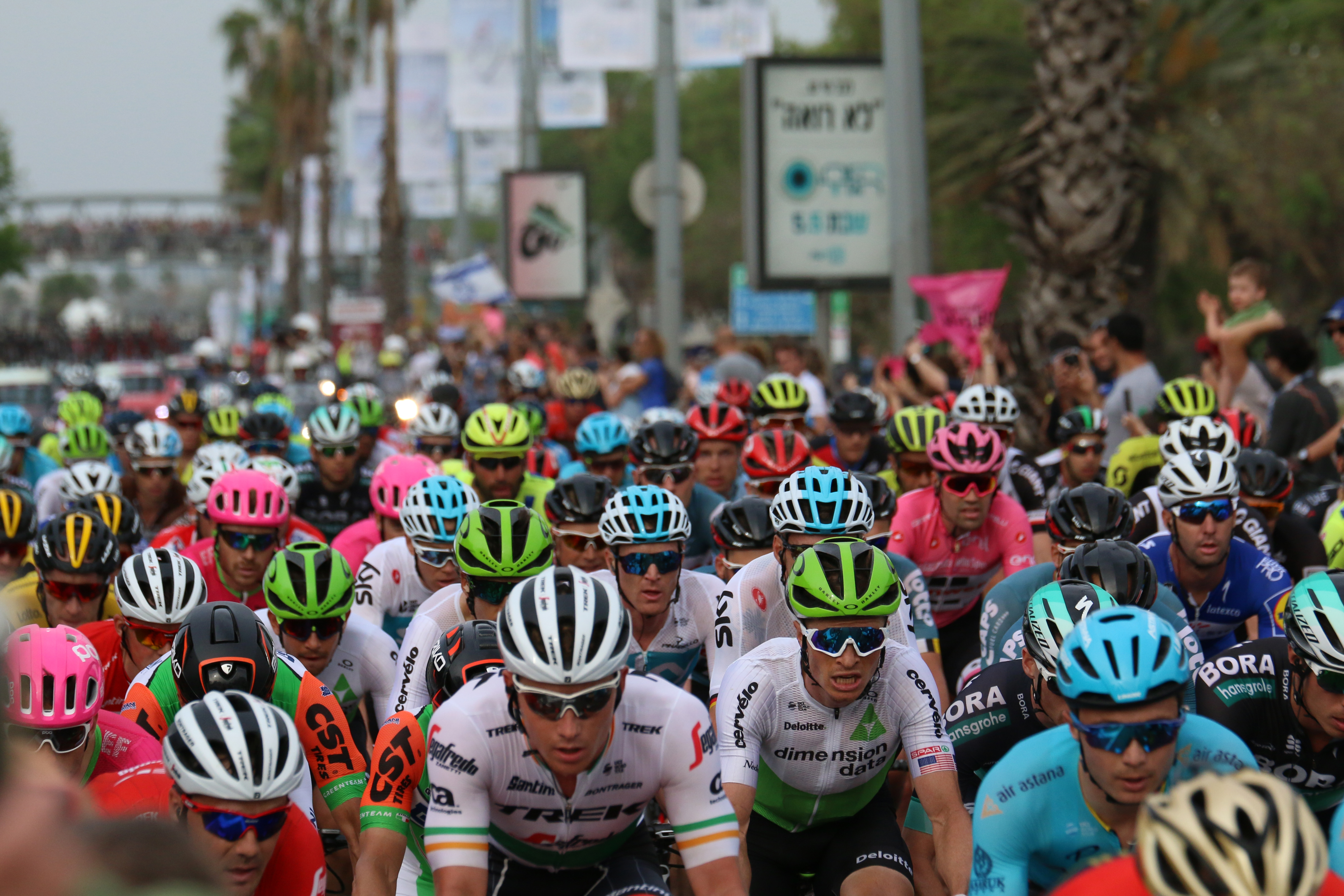
Peloton at 2018 Giro d'Italia

In a road bicycle race, the peloton (from French, originally meaning 'platoon') is the main group or pack of riders. Riders in a group save energy by riding behind or close to other riders (drafting, or slipstreaming). The reduction in drag is dramatic; riding in the middle of a well-developed group, drag can be reduced by as much as 95%. Exploitation of this potential energy saving leads to complex cooperative and competitive interactions between riders and teams in race tactics. The term is also used to refer to the community of professional cyclists in general.

== Definition ==
More formally, a peloton is defined as "two or more cyclists riding in sufficiently close proximity to be located either in one of two basic positions: (1) behind cyclists in zones of reduced air pressure, referred to as ‘drafting’, or (2) in non-drafting positions where air pressure is highest. Cyclists in drafting zones expend less energy than in front positions." A peloton has similarly been defined "as a group of cyclists that are coupled together through the mutual energy benefits of drafting, whereby cyclists follow others in zones of reduced air resistance." A peloton is a complex system, which means that collective behavior emerges from simple rules of cyclists' interactions.

== Formations ==
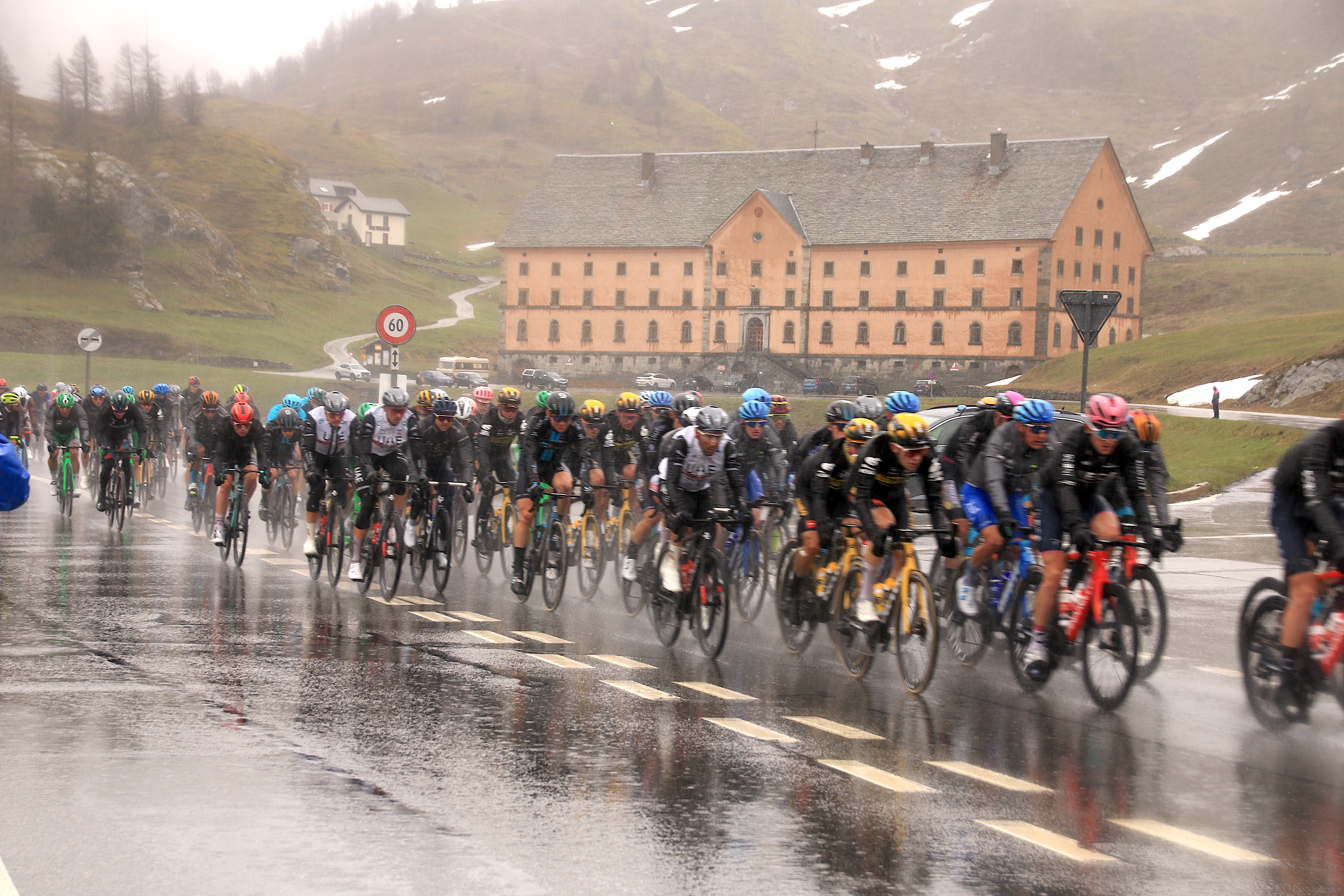
Peloton riding in a straight line to increase slipstreaming, thus reducing drag and conserving energy for cyclists behind, often for key riders such as sprinters or GC cyclists

Pelotons are typically observed during bicycle races in which drafting is permitted, although pelotons also form from cyclist commuter traffic. Pelotons travel as an integrated unit in which each rider makes positional adjustments in response to the movements of adjacent riders and those ahead. Riders at the front are fully exposed to wind resistance, hence they experience higher fatigue loads than riders in drafting positions. After a period of time in front, leading riders maneuver farther back in the peloton to a drafting position to recover. Thus the peloton is in fluid motion as a continuous rotation of riders push from the back through to the leading edge, then falling away. Like bird flocks, peloton-like behavior that involves drafting or similar energy-saving mechanisms has been identified in a variety of biological systems.

The shape or formation of the peloton changes according to multiple factors. Comparatively high power output efforts due to high-speeds on flat topography, a strong headwind or inclines (hills) tends to spread out or lengthen the formation, often into single file. A slow pace or brisk tailwind in which cyclists' power outputs are low result in compact formations such that riders ride side-by-side, often filling roads from one side to the other. When two or more groups of riders have reason to contest control of the peloton, several lines may form, each seeking to impose debilitating fatigue on the other teams. Fatigue is a decisive factor in the outcome of every race. Cyclists' range of peripheral vision is a significant factor in peloton formation.

Thus these formations comprise two main phases of behavior: a compact, low-speed formation, and a single-file, high-speed formation. Peloton phases are indicated by thresholds in collective output that can be modeled mathematically and computationally. The principles of phase behavior identified by Trenchard et al. have been applied to optimize engineering problems.

Similarly, these thresholds in peloton formations define transitions between peloton cooperative behavior and free-riding behavior. Cooperation and free-riding in pelotons have been studied using game theory and as a social dilemma, and have also been considered in terms of equivalencies to aspects of economic theory.

Basic peloton behaviors have also been modelled with robots, and principles of peloton behavior have also been considered in relation to the future of collective robot behavior.

== Models and simulations ==
=== Olds' model ===
Olds' analysis involved peloton breakaway and chasing groups. He identified the factors involved in determining the likelihood that a breakaway group would succeed in reaching the finish ahead of chasing groups. He identified the following critical factors: distance remaining in the race, the speed of the breakaway group, the number of riders in both the breakaway and chasing groups, how closely riders draft each other, course gradient and roughness, and headwinds and crosswinds (referred to as "demand" factors). Introducing riders' physiological variables including metabolic power production and time to exhausion ("supply" factors), Olds' presents an iterative algorithm for determining the mean power of each group and their relative times to exhaustion, thus determining whether the chasers will catch the breakaway.

Olds' key findings include that group mean velocity increases rapidly as a function of group size up to five or six riders, and then continues to increase but only gradually up to about 20 cyclists; wheel spacing is a significant determinant of group speed due to drafting advantages; mean velocity falls as a function of distance remaining; the required lead time for a breakaway group falls rapidly as the number in the breakaway group increases up to about 10 riders, but flattens as the number of riders in the breakaway group approaches the number of riders in the chasing group. Similarly, Olds' observed that if the chase-group size is less than the size of the breakaway group and the wheel spacing among the chasers is greater than 3 meters, a chasing group will never catch a lead group, assuming other factors remain constant between the groups.

=== Hoenigman et al.'s model ===
Agent-based computer models allow for any number of independent "agents" with assigned attributes to interact according to programmed rules of behavior. In this way, simulated global behaviors emerge which can be studied for their properties and compared with actual systems. For their cyclist agents, Hoenigman et al. assigned individual maximum-power-outputs over a heterogeneous range among peloton cyclists and individual and team cooperative attributes in which agents share the most costly front position, or defect by seeking lower-cost drafting positions within the peloton, both according to some probabality. Hoenigman et al. introduced power equations from the literature for non-drafting and drafting positions, an approximate anaerobic threshold as a percentage of cyclists' maximum power when traveling alone without drafting, and a time-to-exhaustion parameter. The authors also introduced a "breakaway" state in which defecting riders increase their speeds to a higher threshold either to breakaway or to catch a group ahead.

The authors performed experiments by varying the noted parameters over a simulated 160 kilometres (99 mi) flat road race containing 15 teams of 10 riders. Cooperators (those willing to take the most costly front position) spend 5 minutes at the front, then rotate to the back of the pack. Defectors spend only one minute at the front. As the race approaches the end, strategies change such that each agent increases their output incrementally based on their remaining energy up to 100% of their maximum power output. Results of the model shows that weaker riders are better off defecting, while cooperation is a good strategy for stronger riders. The results are realistic when compared with real-world competitive cycling and demonstrate the effectiveness of this kind of agent-based model which facilitates accurate identification and analysis of underlying principles of system (in this case, peloton) behavior.

=== Erick Ratamero's simulation ===
Ratemero's peloton simulation

In his 2013 agent-based peloton simulation, Erick Ratamero applied Wilenski's agent-based flocking model that incorporates three main dynamical parameters: alignment, separation and cohesion. Wilenski's model originates from Craig Reynolds' flocking model that incorporates the same parameters, which he described as velocity matching, collision avoidance, and flock centering.

Ratamaro then applied Sayama's algorithm for cohesive and separating forces to adjust agents' acceleration based on their proportionate spacing within a defined field of vision. Ratamero then introduced cyclists' energetic parameters, adopting elements of Olds' equations for cyclists' energy expenditure, and cyclist performance results from Hoenigman, and Kyle's drafting equation. Ratamero then introduced a threshold energetic quantity to simulate the lactate threshold derived from Hoenigman, whereby cyclist-agents which expend energy above this level will fatigue and eventually fall back in position within the simulated peloton. Thus cyclist-agents expend their energy differentially within the peloton based on their positions and proximity to drafting positions.

Ratamero's model demonstrates that cyclists tend to expend energy more efficiently by participating in well-organized lines in which cyclists advance toward the front, even though they might spend more time in front non-drafting positions than some cyclists internal to the peloton whose continual positional adjustments may result in less time in optimal drafting positions. Ratamero's model exhibits self-organized convection-like behavior which Trenchard described as a phase of peloton behavior.

=== Trenchard et al.'s simulation ===
Trenchard et al. peloton simulation

In their 2015 agent-based peloton simulation, Trenchard et al. applied Ratamero's dynamical model, but introduced a different way of modelling the energetic relationships between cyclist-agents. Whereas Ratamero applied a constant maximal sustainable output for all cyclists who then lose energy differentially according to their proximity to drafting positions, Trenchard et al. introduced different maximal sustainable capacities for each cyclist-agent whose positions are determined by the proportion of their maximal capacities to that of the front rider who sets the speed of the peloton. For this they apply the equation:

PCR = [P_{front} - [P_{front} ⋅ (1 - d)]] / MSO_{follow}

where PCR is the "peloton convergence ratio", describing two coupled riders; the non-drafting front-rider sets the pace, while the follower obtains the drafting benefit of reduced power output at the same speed as the front rider. Two-cyclist coupling generalizes to multiple rider interactions.

"P_{front}" is the power output of the front-rider as she sets the pace within the coupled system;

"d" expresses the follower’s energy savings due to drafting, as a fraction (percentage) of the front-rider’s power output;

"MSO_{follow}" is the maximal sustainable power output for the follower.

Thus, if P_{front} exceeds the follower's MSO, the follower will be unable to sustain the speed of the pace-setting front-rider and must decelerate to a speed less than or equal to that speed representative of the limitation of MSO. A drafting cyclist may operate at or below MSO. If the cyclist is at MSO while drafting but conditions change (e.g., the rider falls too far behind or too far to the side of the optimal drafting position, with respect to the leader), then the follower must decelerate. If she is below MSO while drafting but temporarily falls outside drafting range, she can increase power output to maintain the pace of the leader as long as she does not exceed MSO. This algorithm produces a realistic simulation of oscillating phase behavior between compact and stretched pelotons as speeds vary throughout the course of a race. Trenchard et al. tested the model against an actual set of MSOs for 14 cyclists who participated in a velodrome (track) race. The simulation test produced a realistic simulation of the actual race in terms of phase oscillations and cyclist's relative positions.

== Protocooperative behavior in pelotons ==
Trenchard proposed a theoretical framework for peloton "protocooperative" behavior, a form of cooperation that emerges naturally from physical interactive principles as opposed to ones driven by human competitive, sociological or economic motivations. In this way, protocooperative behavior involves universal principles which Trenchard hypothesizes may be found in many biological systems involving energy saving mechanisms. The parameters of protocooperative behavior include: 1. two or more cyclists coupled by drafting benefit; 2. cyclists' power output or speed; and 3. cyclists' maximal sustainable outputs (MSO). The main characteristics of protocooperative behavior are: 1. a comparatively low-speed phase in which cyclists naturally pass each other and share highest-cost front positions; and 2. a free-riding phase (essentially the singe-file phase identified above), in which cyclists can maintain speeds of those ahead, but cannot pass. The threshold between these two phases is equivalent to the coefficient of drafting (d), below which cooperative behavior occurs and above which free-riding (single-file) occurs up to a second threshold when coupled cyclists diverge. Applying the PCR equation (noted above), the range of cyclists’ MSOs in the free-riding phase is equivalent to the energy savings benefit of drafting (1-d). When driven to maximal speeds, pelotons tend to sort into sub-groups such that their MSO ranges equal the free-riding range (1-d).

Trenchard extracts the following principles:

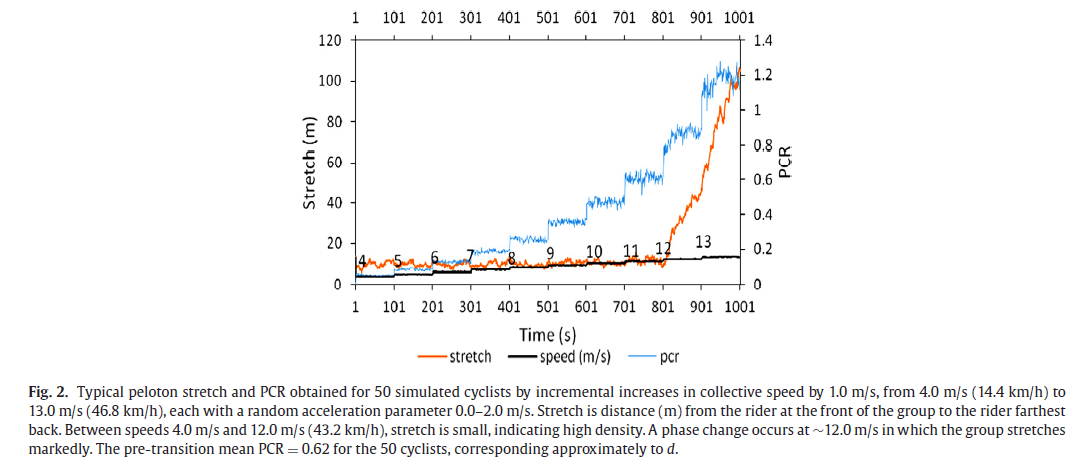
Threshold between compact and stretched peloton.

1. Weaker cyclists can sustain the pace of the strongest rider between PCR = d and PCR = 1 (d < PCR < 1), as free-riders. In this PCR range, equivalent to the energy savings (1-d), these cyclists cannot pass and share the most costly front position. Stronger cyclists in drafting positions will always be able to pass weaker cyclists ahead.
2. As speeds are increased up to maximal speeds set by the strongest riders, cyclists whose MSOs are below the PCR range (1-d), equivalent to the energy saved by drafting, will separate from the peloton (PCR ≥ 1).
3. Cyclists can engage in cooperative behavior (passing and sharing most costly front position) in combinations of MSOs at speeds such that PCR ≤ d.
4. These principles imply that if cyclists in a peloton exhibit a range of MSOs greater than the energy savings equivalent of drafting (1-d), over time and continual fluctuations in peloton speed, the peloton will divide such that sub-groups fit within the range equivalent of 1-d.

It is this sorting behavior that Trenchard hypothesizes to be a universal evolutionary principle among biological systems coupled by an energy-saving mechanism, which he and collaborators have developed further in relation to extinct trilobites and slime mold.

== See also ==
- Glossary of bicycling
- Road bicycle racing
- Autobus (cycling) – Group of cyclists behind leading peloton
- Bike bus – Group of utility cyclists
- Platoon (automobile) – Group of vehicles travelling separately but following another
