= Subway party =

Celebration on a mass transit system

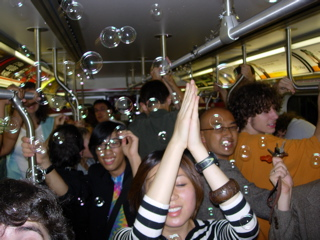
A subway party that took place in Toronto

A subway party is a celebration that occurs on a mass transit system. Generally, people meet at a predetermined station in their city's mass transit system, wait until their numbers have achieved critical mass, and board the train. From there, revelers may engage in many different activities, from playing music and dancing to exchanging gifts.

There are several kinds of subway parties, the two most distinct being the rush hour subway party and the late night subway party.

== Types ==
Rush hour subway parties aim to spread joy to commuters, whose daily treks into the center of their metropolis can be long, boring or stressful. Several subway party groups have boarded subway cars dressed in goat skins to give presents to commuters, and have been known to play parcheesi, wear wings and sprinkle glitter on the willing.

Late night subway parties are for the enjoyment of the attendees. Party-goers don costumes, decorate the subway car, bring musical instruments and sometimes the parties have a theme.

On nights that are especially festive such as New Year's or World Cup victories, a spontaneous subway party may occur. People may already be drinking above ground and decide to board the subway. When this happens, the general feeling of revelry continues below ground.

Critics of subway parties of this kind say that, by introducing chaos, these activities may place the already-crowded subway riders in danger or cause delays. Also, some people may simply become annoyed by them.

With the advent of email and cellphones, invitations to subway parties can now be distributed electronically. The party usually starts at one subway station and acquires more participants as it proceeds through the system. The instructions often ask people to meet by the last car of the train.

== History ==
In 1904, the New York City Subway system's first line opened. Photographs from the event show people dressed in tuxedos and top hats and drinking champagne to celebrate.

In the 1980s, Michael Alig and the Club Kids threw parties on New York City subway trains where they purportedly took the drug ecstasy. The events were promoted through word of mouth and telephones. These parties are detailed in the book Disco Bloodbath.

In the late 1990s the Ransom Corp Collective threw a series— the Red Line Action Party, The Orange Line Party, The Yellow Line and the Blue Line ranging from one car bacchanales to whole train takeovers. Revelers wore clothes the color of the line. Fake ads replaces subway ads. Liquids in line colors were passed. Marine battery powered sound systems roamed the cars along with marching bands and beat boxers. The MTA expressed several trains to Coney Island end stops where impromptu fire dancers took stage on the beach and many plunged into the ocean. Orange line was photographed in the New York Times. An excerpt of the exercise documented in the Cultural Resistance Reader by Stephen Duncombe.

In 2005, the Toronto Transit Commission declared October "culture month", perhaps inspired by recent subway parties in the city. This campaign included "culture cars", which were randomly selected cars that contained spontaneous, professional singing, dancing and music.

== See also ==
- Flashmob
- Circle Line Party
- Newmindspace
- Improv Toronto

== Sources ==
- McGinn, Dave. "Don't stop the guerrilla party train". Dose magazine, 18 Aug 2005.
- Lazarovic, Sarah. "Revelers See Stars at Underground Celebration". The Globe and Mail, 16 Aug 2005.
- "Subway parties". CBC's The Hour with George Stroumboulopoulos, 12 Dec 2005.
- James St. James. "Disco Bloodbath: A Fabulous But True Tale of Murder in Clubland".
