= Bike bus (disambiguation) =

Bike bus may refer to:

- Bike bus, a group of people on bikes that follow a route on a schedule as a means of transportation.
- Bike bus, a bus that has attached a bicycle carrier for transporting bicycles.
- Bike bus or pedal bus, a collective transport vehicle that moves thanks to the pedaling of its passengers.
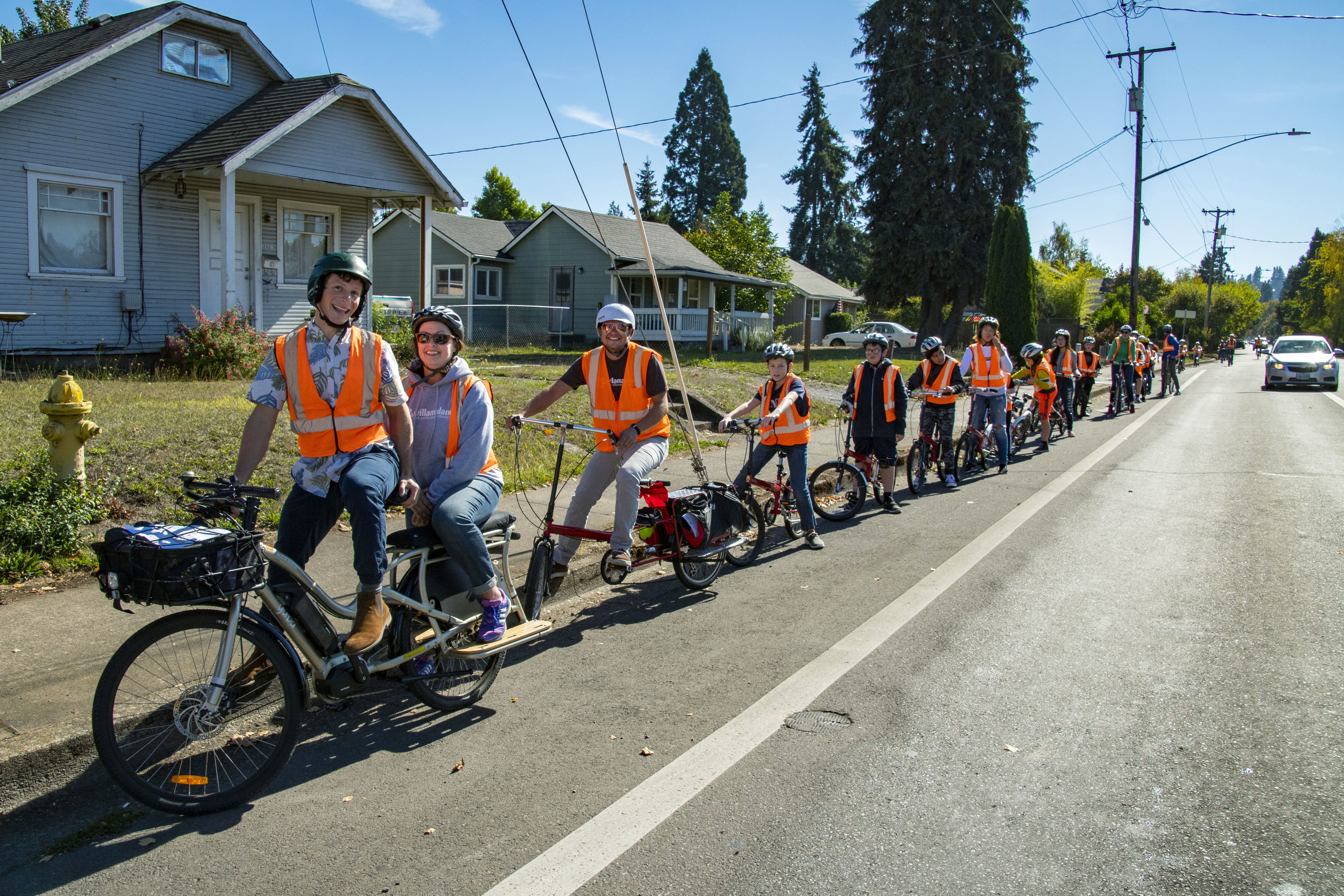
A bike bus on the way to school.

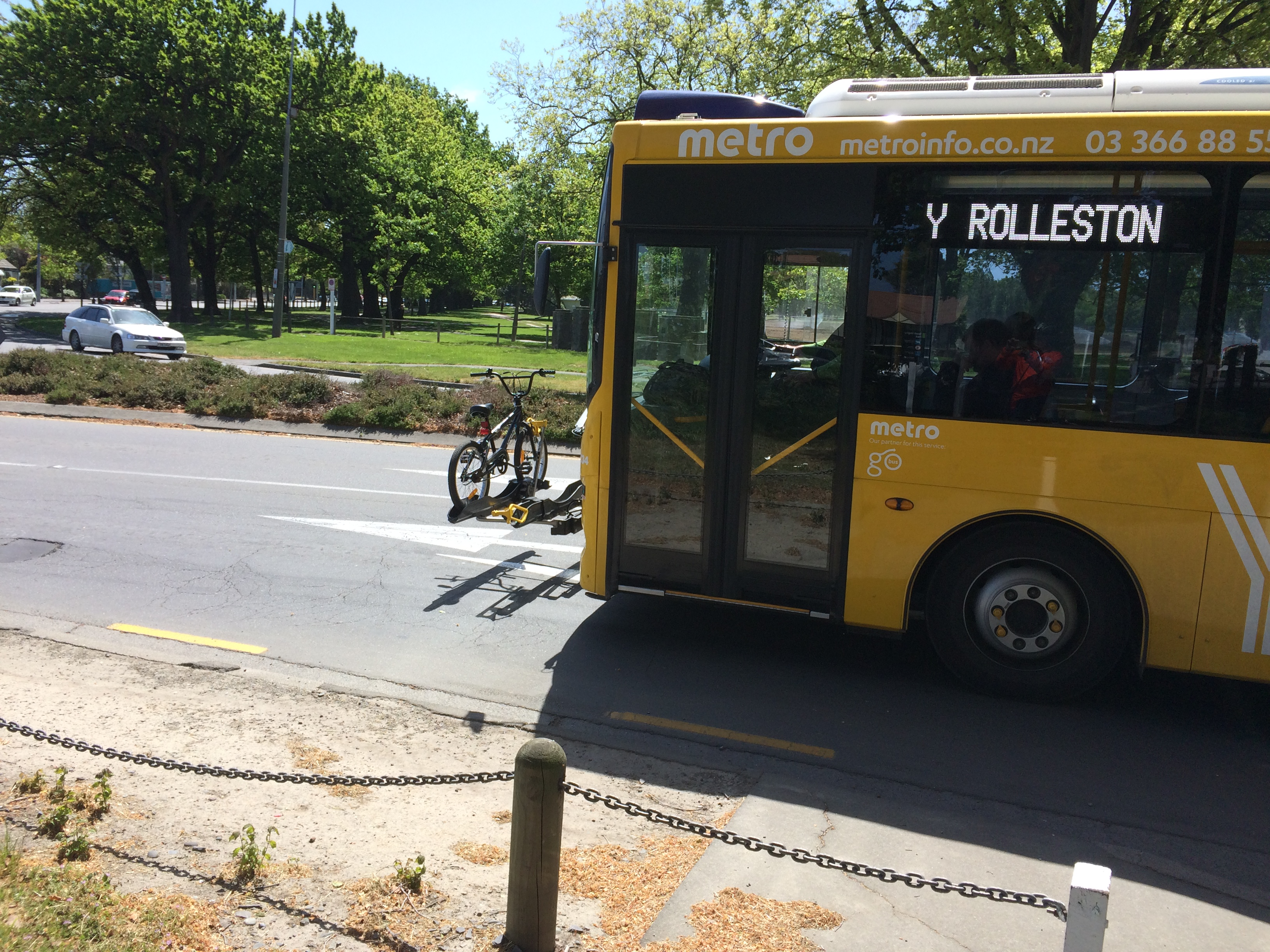
A bike bus with a bicycle carrier.

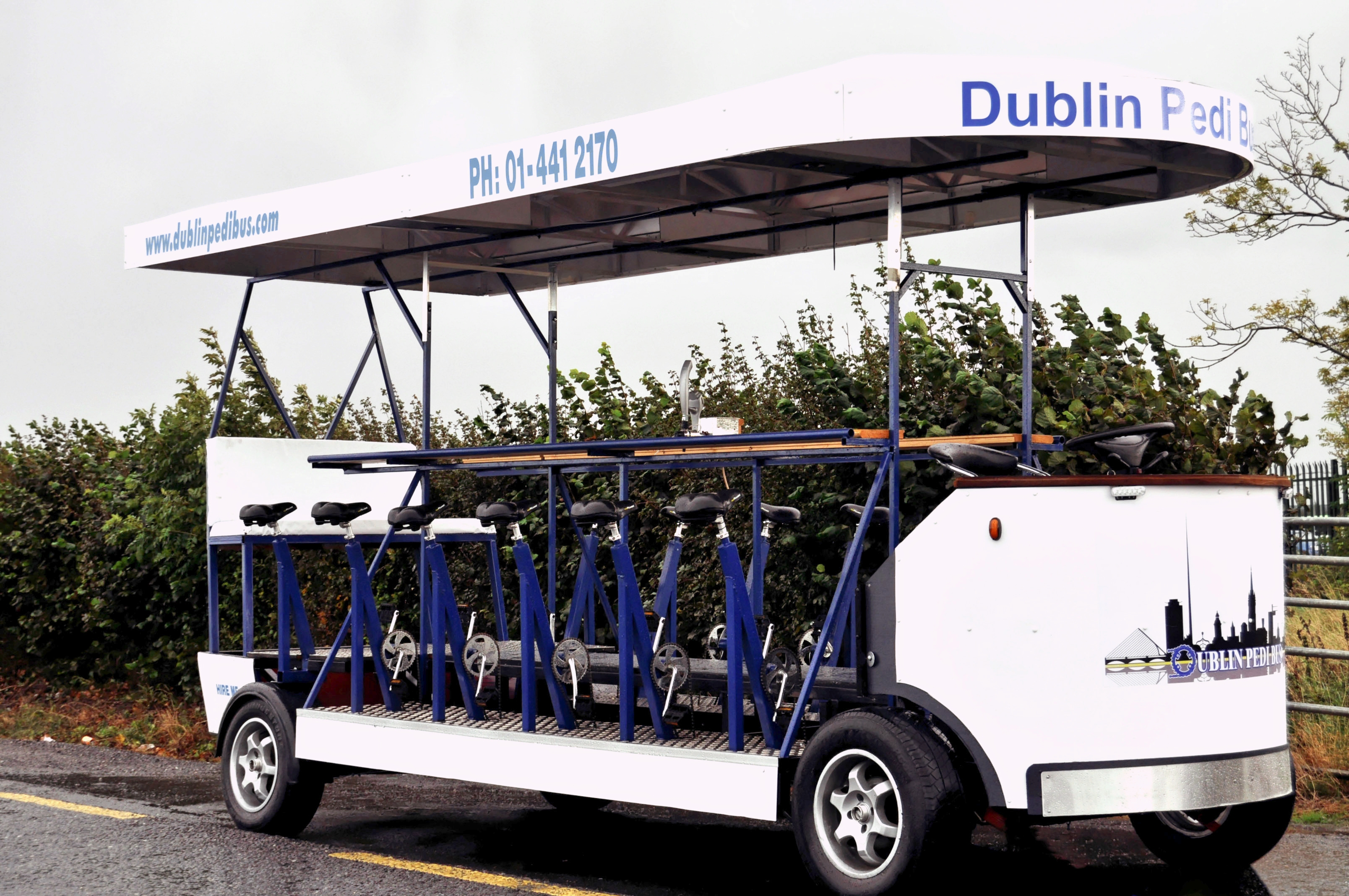
A touristic bike bus.
