= Bike bus =

Group of utility cyclists

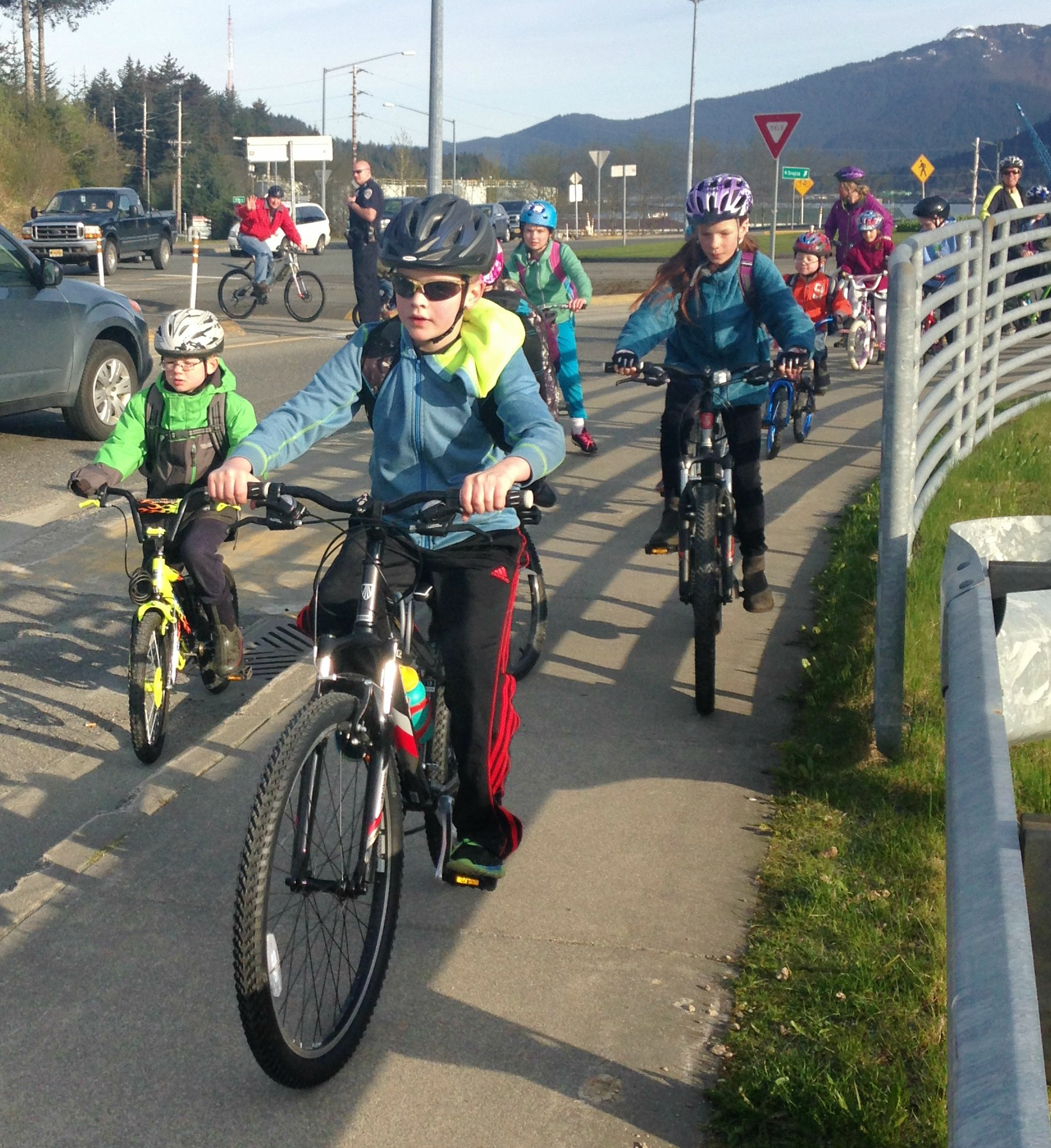
Gastineau Elementary Bike to School Day

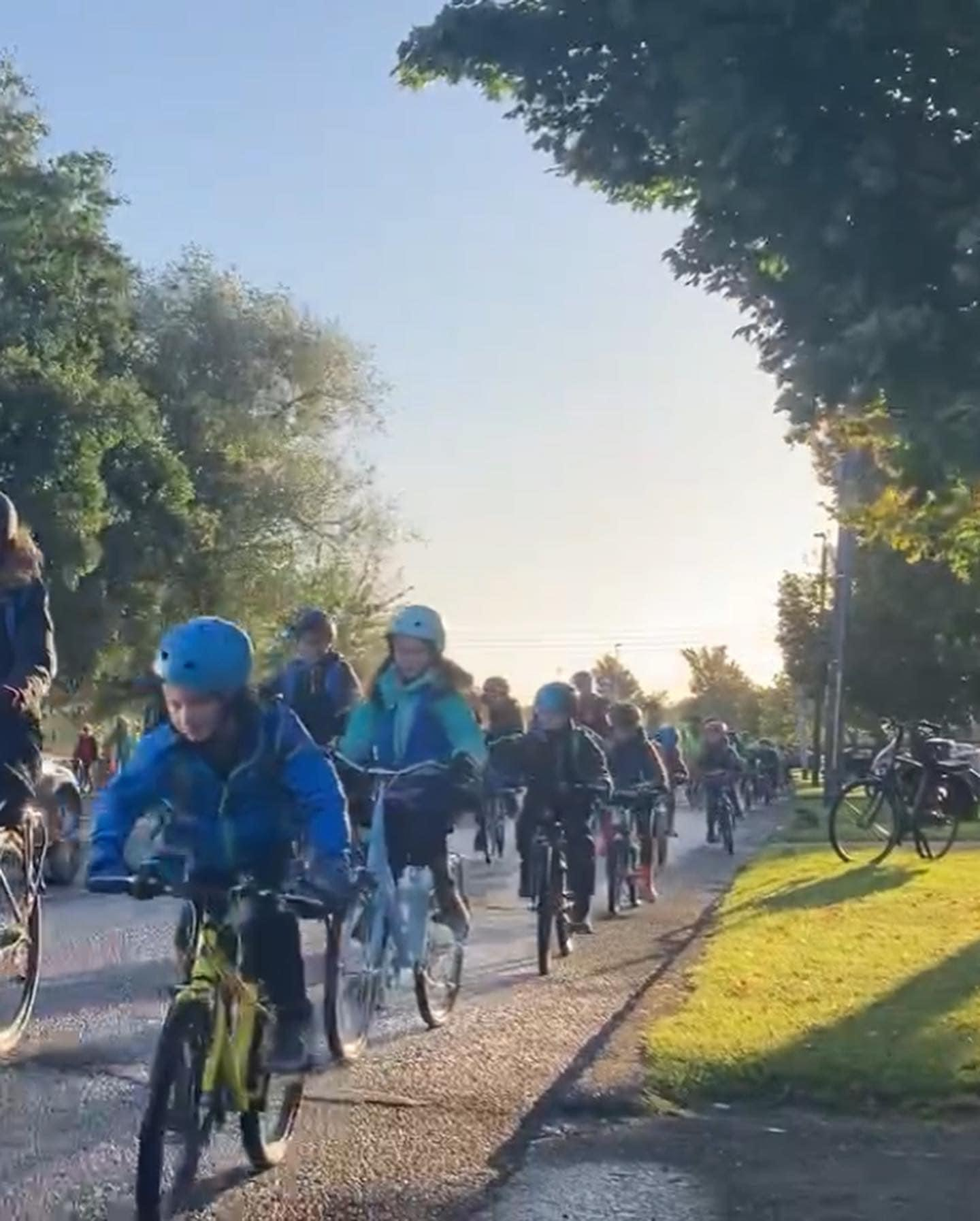
Bike bus in Dublin.

A bike bus, also known as a bike train or a cycle train, or cycle bus is a group of people who cycle together on a set route following a set timetable other than for sporting purposes. Cyclists may join or leave the bike bus at various points along the route. Most bike buses are a form of collective bicycle commuting (usually parents cycling their children together).

A bike bus is often seen as a cyclist's version of a walking bus, although walking buses tend to be seen as exclusively for children travelling to school.

Bike buses may have social, environmental, or political aims. One of the founders of the Aire Valley Bike Bus said "The Aire Valley Bike Bus was set up ... to encourage people to take up cycling and make the journey to work a more interesting and sociable experience". The stated aim of the Central Florida Bike Bus is "bringing together cyclists who want to commute by bike using the same roads as every other vehicle". The aim of the D12BikeBus in Dublin 12, Ireland is to make cycling to school safer and easier while lobbying for safe cycling infrastructure.

== Examples of bike buses ==
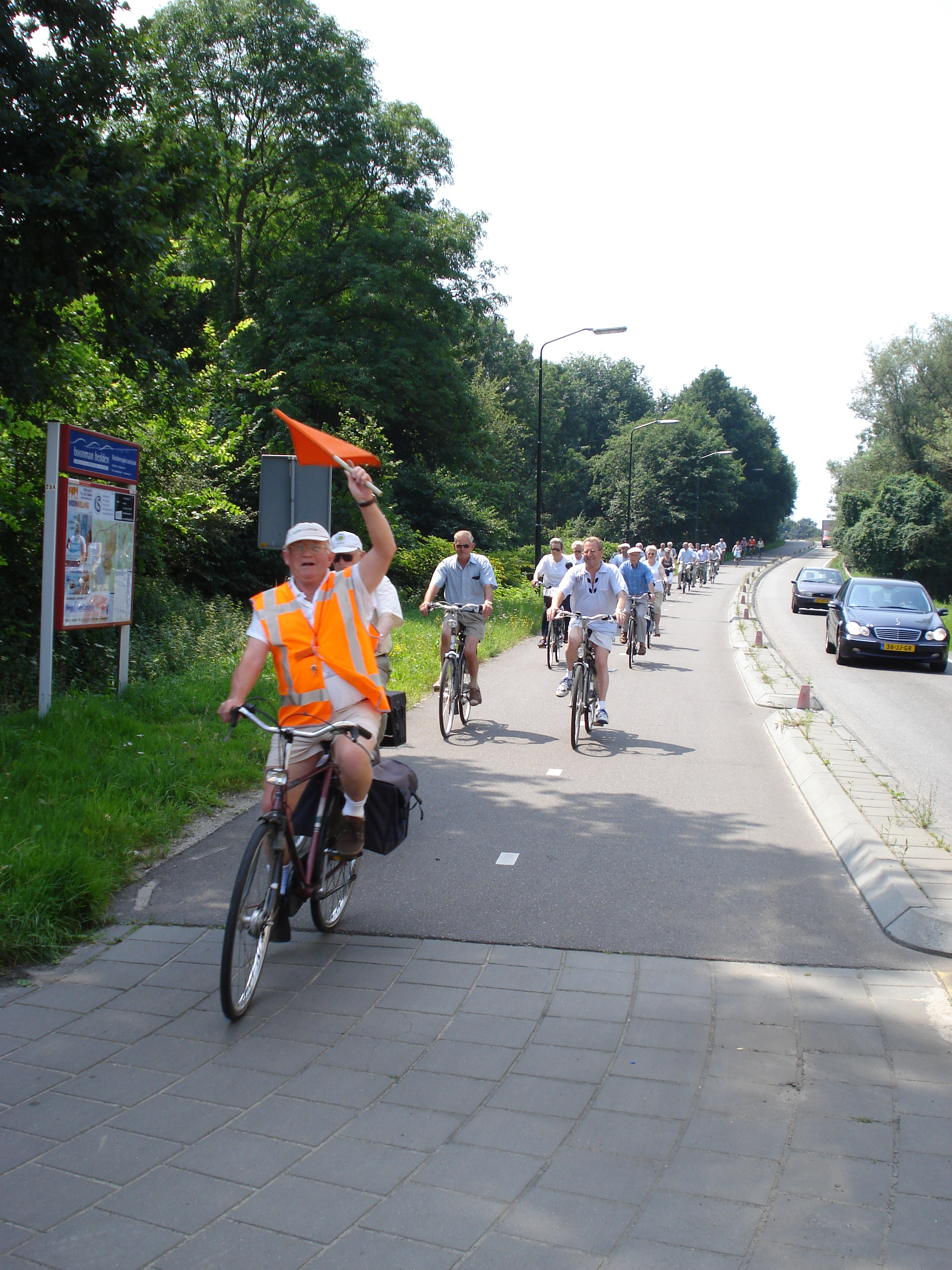
Bike bus of adults, Eerde, Netherlands

=== Aire Valley Bike Bus ===
The Aire Valley Bike Bus first started in August 2008. It runs once a week, on a Wednesday, between Keighley and Bradford in West Yorkshire, UK. In November 2009 it was featured as Cycling England's Scheme of the Month.

=== Bike Bus (AU) ===
Bike Bus is run by members of Bicycle New South Wales, Australia on a voluntary basis and has received funding from The Department of Environment and Water Resources, through the Low Emissions Technology and Abatement – Strategic Abatement program. It is a "community-led service to introduce groups of people to ride a set route together, to introduce beginners to a route, or enjoy each others company".

=== Bike Bus (FR) ===
Bike Bus is a French company based in the Dordogne delivering rental bikes to visitors all over France. Bike Bus (FR) began in 2002 and is currently the oldest bike rental company in the Dordogne.

=== Biketrain PDX ===
Biketrain PDX was started by Kiel Johnson in 2010. It co-ordinates bike trains, a form of bike bus, for school children in Portland, Oregon, with the aim of having a bike train running at every single school.

=== Bus Cyclistes ===
Perhaps the first bike bus initiative, based in Toulouse, France it now shows bike buses across France.

=== Central Florida Bike Bus ===
First operated on 23 August 2010, the service runs to and from the University of Central Florida. It utilizes a real-time tracking system, allowing passengers to locate the bike bus/

=== CicloExpresso (PT) ===
CicloExpresso is a bike to school project that started in 2015 in Lisbon and has since spread to Aveiro.

=== Kingston upon Thames ===
This bike bus ran every Monday in March 2011 from Sutton to Kingston upon Thames, UK, a total distance of roughly 7.5 miles. They claimed they would "complete the journey in about an hour – that's less time than the 213 bus takes during peak times!"

The service was led by cycle instructors and was provided by Sutton Council and Kingston Council.

=== Massa Marmocchi Milano (IT) ===
Massa Marmocchi Milano is an Italian bike bus company.

=== Nether Edge, Sheffield ===
Started in June 2013, following the Bus Cyclistes Model, to provide a regular Saturday "bus service" that introduces local residents to safe routes in the corridor between Nether Edge and Sheffield City Centre.

=== D12BikeBus, Ireland ===
Running since 2019, with its greatest distance travelled of over 5 kilometres, the D12BikeBus is parents and children banding together to cycle safely to school while lobbying councils to make their way safer and easier. It runs from Crumlin to Greenhils, Dublin 12.

=== Bicibús (Europe) ===
Bicibús.eu is a European initiative to create bike bus projects in collaboration with municipalities and educational communities. It also provides resources such as the 'Bicibús KIT' or a mobile application to set up a bicycle bus in a school."

== Student transport ==
As walking buses tend to focus on student transport to and from school, bike buses can also operate to and from schools escorted and supervised by adults including for other human-powered transport such as scooters.

A riding school bus is a group of schoolchildren supervised by one or more adults, riding bicycles along a set route, picking children up at their homes along the way until they all arrive at school. Riding school buses are similar to walking bus or bike bus programs. Like a traditional bus, riding school buses (also known as RSBs) have a fixed route with designated "bus stops" and "pick up times" in which they pick up children. Ideally the riding school bus will include at least 1 adult 'driver', who leads the group, and an adult 'conductor' who supervises from the end of the group.

Riding school bus programs have been developed in a number of local councils in Victoria, Australia, including City of Merri-bek and Shire of East Gippsland.

Riding school bus programs deliver a number of benefits:

- Improvement in child fitness and health
- Environmental benefits – reduction in car trips and associated air pollution
- Development of traffic skills and confidence in children
- Socialization and increased community engagement for children
- Reduction of traffic congestion around schools

Riding school buses are also known as pedal pods or Cycling School Buses.

== See also ==
- Bike bus (disambiguation)
- Autobus (cycling)
- Critical Mass (cycling)
- Cycle touring
- Peloton
- Safety in numbers
- Tweed run
- School street
