= Feeder ride =

A feeder ride is a bike ride where a group of cyclists get together to ride to a destination which is itself the starting point of a major bike ride event. Critical Mass rides and Ciclovia events typically attract feeder rides. Depending on the geography, feeder rides can sometimes take on the appearance of a star when represented on a map, hence "Sternfahrt" in German. Feeder rides may have developed from so called "tributary marches" which were common in the anti-war movement.

Feeder rides facilitate the communal participation of a loosely connected group of riders who may share the same workplace, go to the same school or church, or live in the same neighborhood. They are a very effective tool to include newcomers and novices in community bike events. Participants of the feeder ride may also choose to represent their group on the main event by colors, clothing, or other decorations.
