= Safety in numbers =

Hypothesis

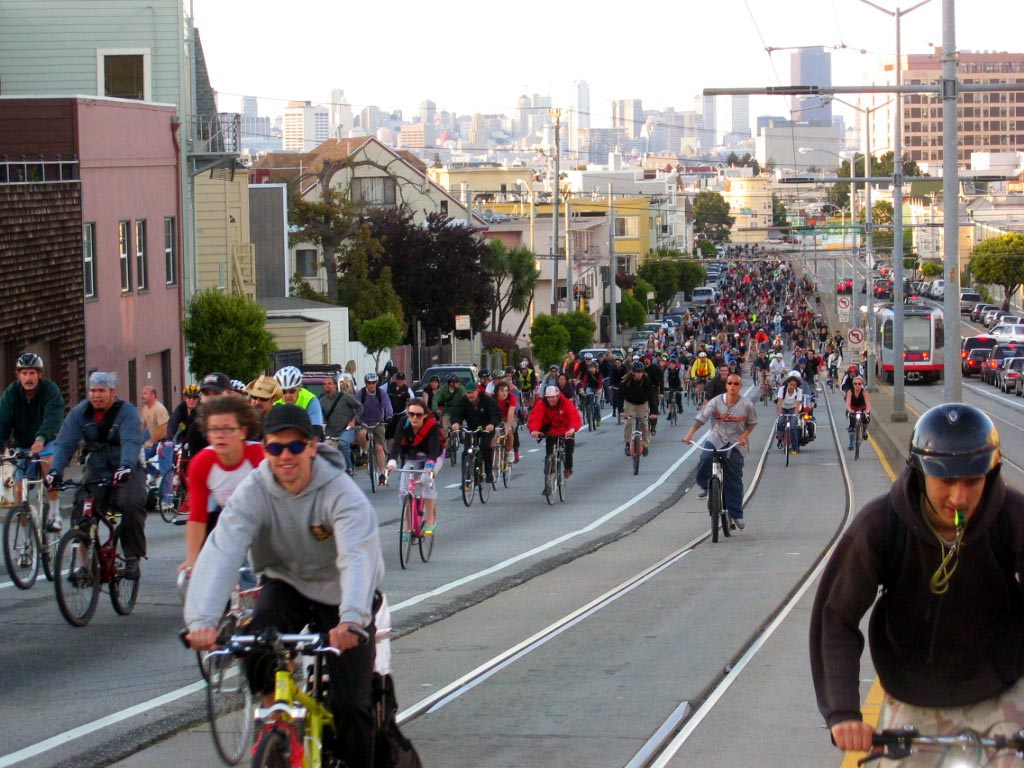
Critical Mass, San Francisco, April 29, 2005 and Muni Metro tram on J Church line

Safety in numbers is the hypothesis that, by being part of a large physical group or mass, an individual is less likely to be the victim of a mishap, accident, attack, or other bad event. Some related theories also argue (and can show statistically) that mass behaviour (by becoming more predictable and "known" to other people) can reduce accident risks, such as in traffic safety – in this case, the safety effect creates an actual reduction of danger, rather than just a redistribution over a larger group.

== In biology ==
The mathematical biologist W.D. Hamilton proposed his selfish herd theory in 1971 to explain why animals seek central positions in a group. Each individual can reduce its own domain of danger by situating itself with neighbours all around, so it moves towards the centre of the group. The effect was tested in brown fur seal predation by great white sharks. Using decoy seals, the distance between decoys was varied to produce different domains of danger. As predicted, the seals with a greater domain of danger had an increased risk of shark attack. Antipredator adaptations include behaviour such as the flocking of birds, herding of sheep and schooling of fish. Similarly, Adelie penguins wait to jump into the water until a large enough group has assembled, reducing each individual's risk of seal predation. This behavior is also seen in masting and predator satiation where the predators are overwhelmed with an abundance of prey during a period of time resulting in more of the prey surviving.

== In road traffic safety ==
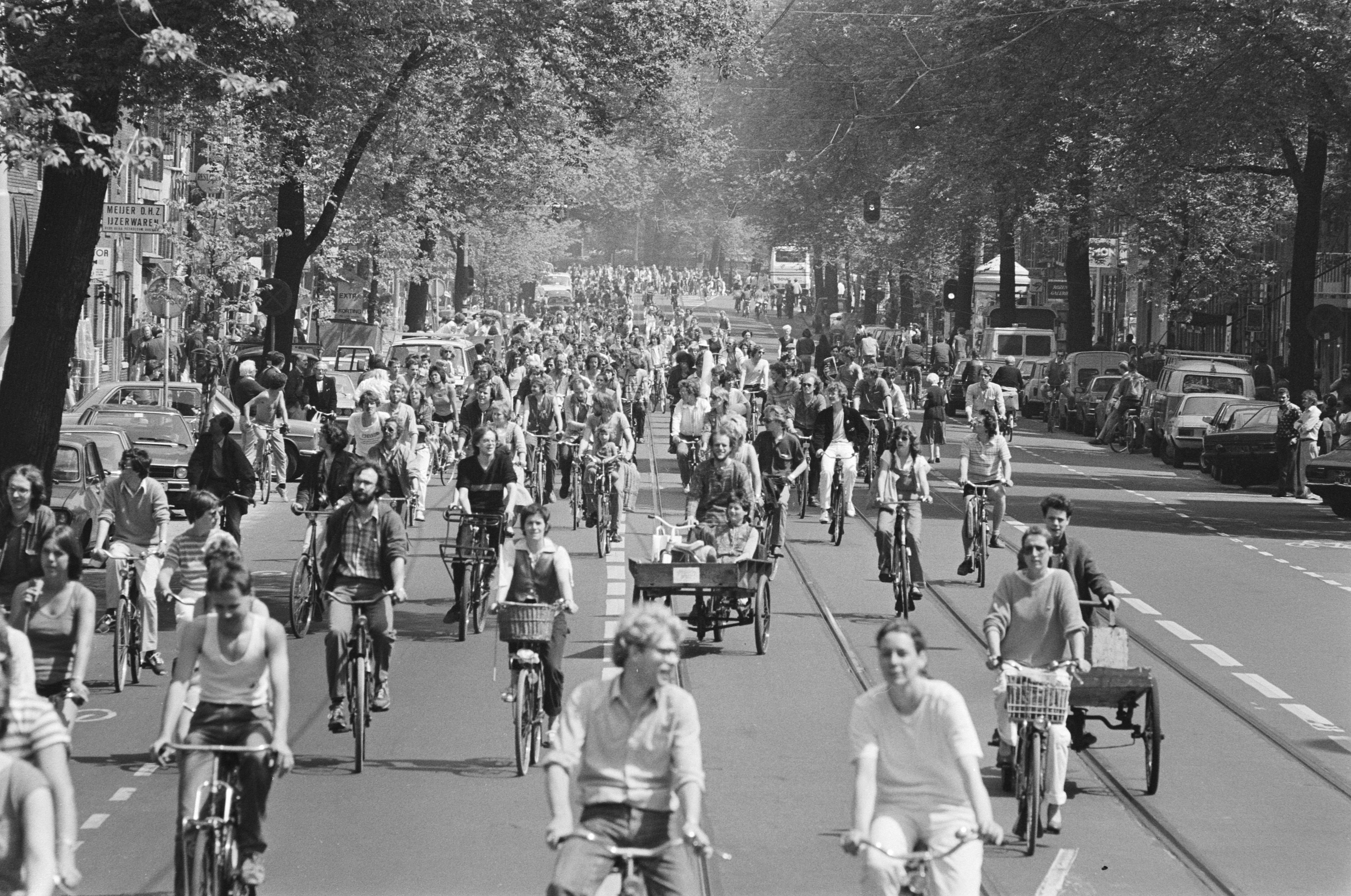
Amsterdam, 1982

In 1949 R. J. Smeed reported that per capita road fatality rates tended to be lower in countries with higher rates of motor vehicle ownership. This observation led to Smeed's Law. Smeed's law proposes that increasing traffic volume leads to a decrease in fatalities per vehicle.

In 2003 Peter L. Jacobsen compared rates of walking and cycling, in a range of countries, with rates of collisions between motorists and cyclists or walkers. He found an inverse relationship. Correlation does not imply causation. If greater safety results in more walking and cycling, then improved safety would precede rates of walking or cycling. Jacobsen hypothesised that the correlation could be explained by 'behavioural adaptation', whereby drivers who are exposed to greater numbers of cyclists on the road begin to drive more safely around them. He concluded that "A motorist is less likely to collide with a person walking and bicycling if more people walk or bicycle." He described this theory as "safety in numbers." This concept has not been empirically validated. It is superficially for cycling advocates. But "Safety in numbers" (Smeed's Law) can also be used to argue for increased rates of car travel. Other combined modelling and empirical evidence suggests that while changes in driver behaviour might still be one way that collision risk per cyclist declines with greater numbers, the effect can be easily produced through simple spatial processes (traffic design) akin to the biological herding processes described above.

Safety in numbers is also used to describe the evidence that the number of pedestrians or cyclists correlates inversely with the risk of a motorist colliding with a pedestrian or cyclist. This non-linear relationship was first shown at intersections. It has been confirmed by ecologic data from cities in California and Denmark, and European countries, and time-series data for the United Kingdom and the Netherlands. The number of pedestrians or bicyclists injured increases at a slower rate than would be expected based on their numbers. That is, more people walk or cycle where the risk to the individual pedestrian or bicyclist is lower. A 2002 study into whether pedestrian risk decreased with pedestrian flow, using 1983-86 data from signalized intersections in a town in Canada, found that in some circumstances pedestrian flow increased where the risk per pedestrian decreased.

The number of people cycling along Canberra's Northbourne Avenue between 7.30am and 9am trebled to 121 in 2005, from 40 in 2004, following completion of an on-road cycle lane. This supports the hypothesis that improved cycling safety causes the rate of cycling to increase.

After cycling was promoted in Finland, there was a 75% drop in cyclists deaths and the number of trips increased by 72%.

In England, between 2000 and 2008, serious bicycle injuries declined by 12%. Over the same period, the number of bicycle trips made in London doubled. Motor vehicle traffic decreased by 16%, bicycle use increased by 28% and cyclist injuries had decreased by 20% in the first year of operation of the London congestion charge. In January 2008, the number of cyclists in London being treated in hospitals for serious injuries had increased by 100% in six years. Over the same time, they report, the number of cyclists had increased by 84%. In York, comparing the periods 1991-93 and 1996–98, the number of bicyclists killed and seriously injured fell by 59%. The share of trips made by bicycle rose from 15% to 18%.

In Germany, between 1975 and 2001, the total number of bicycle trips made in Berlin almost quadrupled. Between 1990 and 2007, the share of trips made by bicycle increased from 5% to 10%. Between 1992 and 2006, the number of serious bicycle injuries declined by 38%. In Germany as a whole, between 1975 and 1998, cyclist fatalities fell by 66% and the percent of trips made by bicycle rose from 8% to 12%.

In America, during the period 1999-2007, the absolute number of cyclists killed or seriously injured decreased by 29% and the amount of cycling in New York city increased by 98%. In Portland, Oregon, between 1990 and 2000, the percentage of workers who commuted to work by bicycle rose from 1.1% to 1.8%. By 2008, the proportion has risen to 6.0%; while the number of workers increased by only 36% between 1990 and 2008, the number of workers commuting by bicycle increased 608%. Between 1992 and 2008, the number of bicyclists crossing four bridges into downtown was measured to have increased 369% between 1992 and 2008. During that same period, the number of reported crashes increased by only 14%.

In Copenhagen, Denmark, between 1995 and 2006, the number of cyclists killed or seriously injured fell by 60%. During the same period, cycling increased by 44% and the percent of people cycling to work increased from 31% to 36%.

In the Netherlands, between 1980 and 2005, and cyclist fatalities decreased by 58% and cycling increased by 45%.

During 7 years of the 1980s, admissions to hospital of cyclists declined by 5% and cycling in Western Australia increased by 82%.

== See also ==
- Bike bus
- Critical Mass
- Predator satiation
- Proverbs 11:14
- Walking bus
