= Autobus (cycling) =

Group of cyclists behind leading peloton

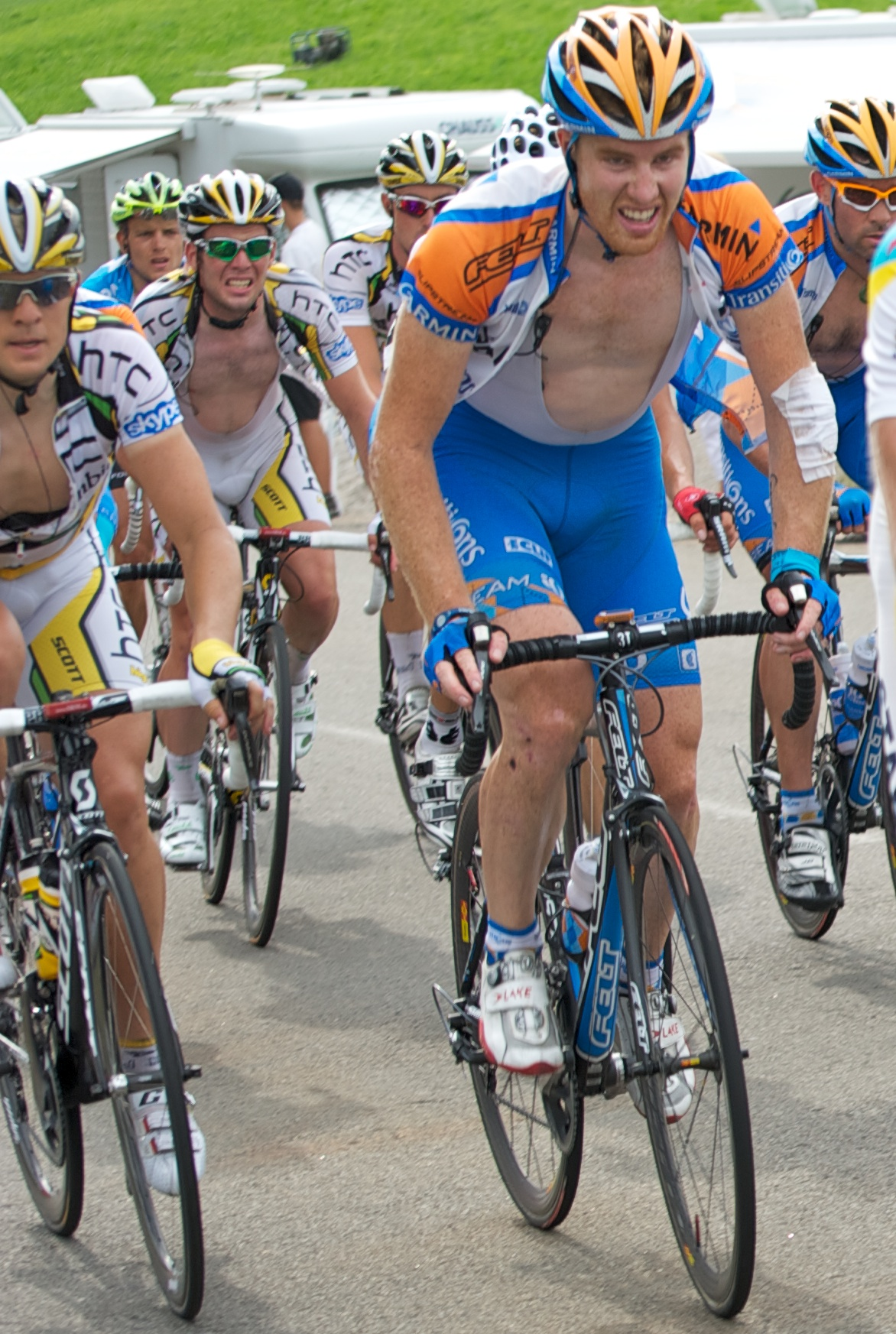
The autobus in a stage in the 2010 Tour de France. In the foreground Tyler Farrar, in the background Mark Cavendish, both sprinters.

In road bicycle racing an autobus or gruppetto is a group of cyclists who form a large group behind the main peloton.

The autobus forms on mountain stages when non-climbers can't keep up and drop off the back of the peloton during the climb. These riders are generally sprinters or domestiques unconcerned about their finishing positions in the mountain stages. Their primary concern is beating the elimination time to ensure their survival in a multi-stage race such as the Tour de France. As such they are amongst the best descenders, pushing to make up enough time to stay in the race.

If the autobus arrives outside the elimination time, the organisers may extend the elimination time if the autobus is larger than 20% of the riders. However, if a rider is dropped from the autobus in this situation they will almost certainly be eliminated unless they have suffered an accident, in which case they may be exempted. The elimination time varies depending on the organisers; in the Tour de France there are differing coefficients depending on the difficulty of the stage. These coefficients are a percentage of the stage winner's time.

Due to the common interest in survival, the mood in the autobus often has a greater sense of camaraderie than in the main peloton. Riders often assist one another with food and drinks despite riding for separate teams. It is sometimes referred to as "the laughing group". Over the years there have been many riders who have become well-known for taking control of the group, shepherding the group over the line, including Eros Poli and Bernhard Eisel.
