= Critical Mass (cycling) =

Group cycling advocating cycling friendly policy

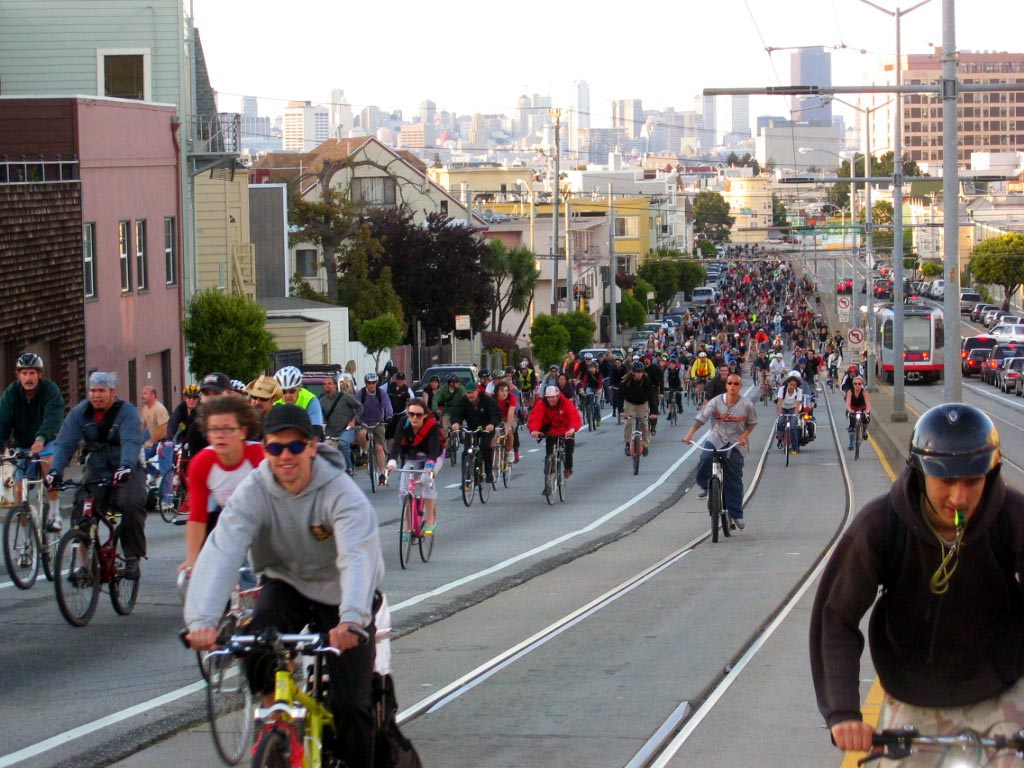
San Francisco Critical Mass, April 29, 2005

Critical Mass is a form of direct action in which people travel as a group on bicycles at a set location and time. The idea is for people to group together to make it safe for each other to ride bicycles through their streets, based on the old adage: there's safety in numbers.

Critical Mass events highlight the numbers of people who want to use their bicycle on the streets, but are usually unable to do so without risking their safety. They are a call to action to councils, governments and road planners to properly and thoughtfully design in the safety of all road users, including those who would prefer to walk and cycle, instead of prioritising motor traffic above all else.

The event originated in 1992 in San Francisco (typically held on the last Friday of every month); by the end of 2003, the event was being held in over 300 cities around the world.

Critical Mass has been described as "monthly political-protest rides", and characterized as being part of a social movement. It has been described as a "monthly protest by cyclists reclaiming the streets." Participants have insisted that these events should be viewed as "celebrations" and spontaneous gatherings, and not as protests or organized demonstrations. This stance allows Critical Mass to argue a legal position that its events can occur without advance notification of local police. Though they are sometimes described as political, they are not necessarily.

== History ==
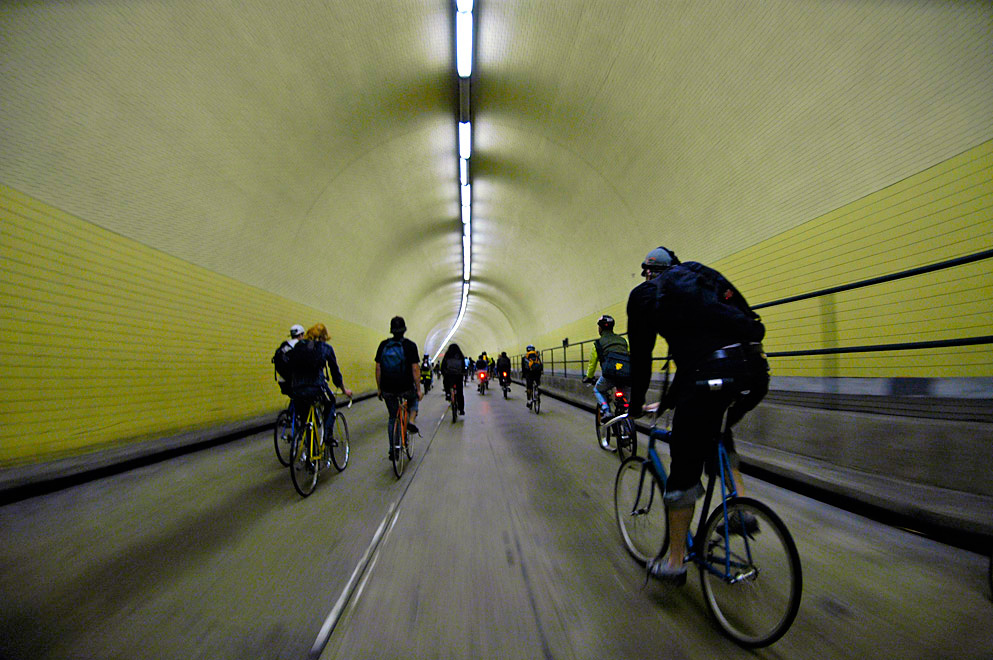
Broadway Tunnel (San Francisco) September 29, 2006

Critical Mass-like bicycle tours with hundreds of participants took place in Stockholm, Sweden in the early 1970s and São Paulo in the 1980s. The first ride termed as being a "Critical Mass" took place on Friday, September 25, 1992, at 6 pm in San Francisco. At that time, the event was known as Commute Clot and was composed of a couple of dozen cyclists who had received flyers on Market Street.

Shortly after this, some participants in that ride went to a local bicycle shop for a screening of Ted White's documentary Return of the Scorcher, about bicycle culture in the Netherlands and China in comparison with that of the United States. In that film, American human-powered vehicle and pedicab designer George Bliss noted that, in China, both motorists and bicyclists had an "understood" method of negotiating intersections without signals. Traffic would queue up at these intersections until the backlog reached a "critical mass", at which point that mass would move through the intersection. This term from the footage of the movie, was applied to the name of the ride, and the name caught on, replacing "Commute Clot" by the time of the second event.

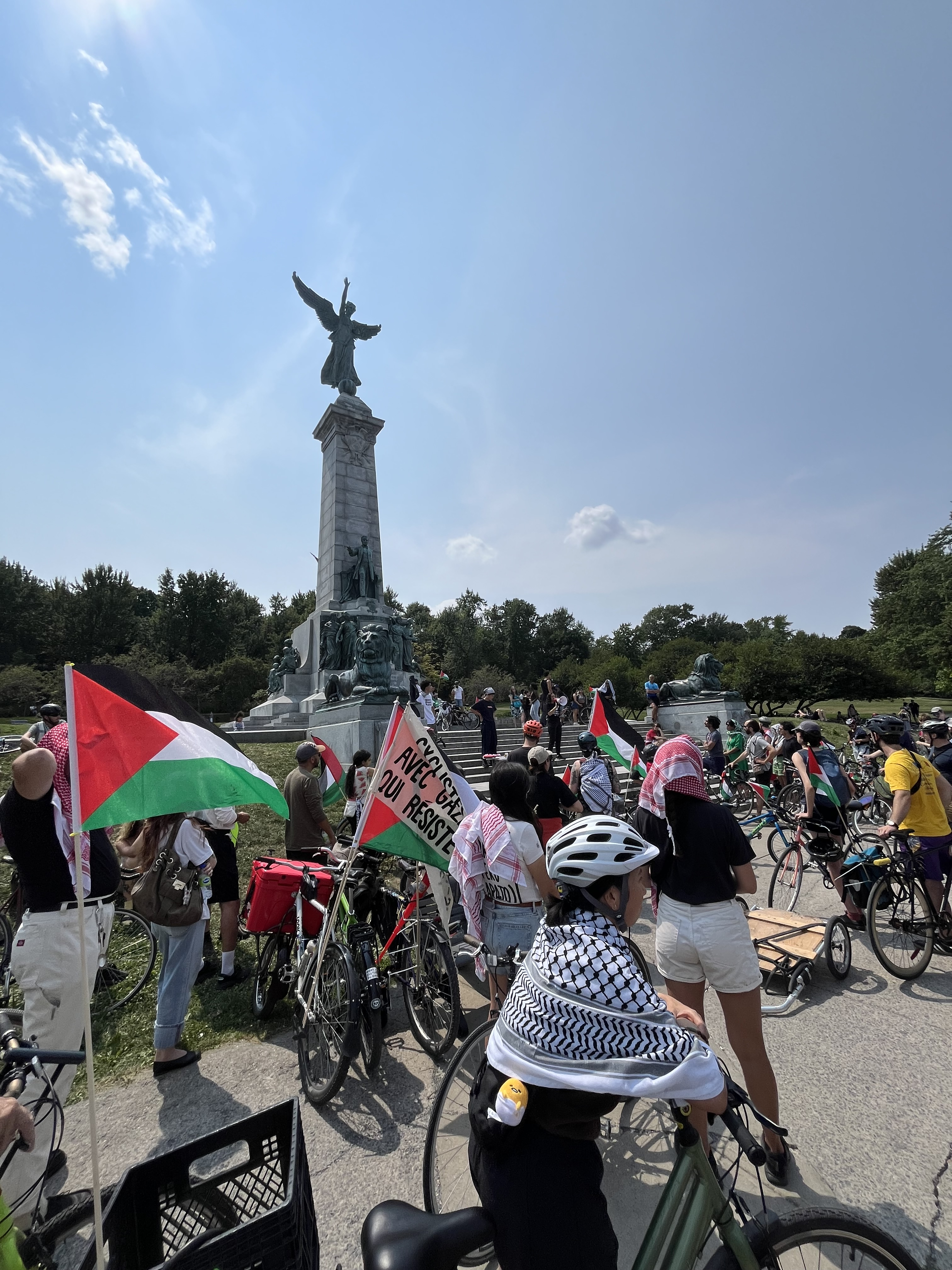
Critical Mass in Montréal, at the George-Étienne Cartier Monument

== Organization and tactics ==
Full path of Critical Mass in Lisbon in April 2012

Critical Mass has a decentralized (rather than hierarchical) structure. Critical Mass is sometimes called an "organized coincidence", with no leadership or membership. The routes of some rides are decided spontaneously by whoever is currently at the front of the ride, while others are decided prior to the ride by a popular vote of suggested routes often drawn up on photocopied fliers. The term xerocracy was coined to describe a process by which the route for a Critical Mass can be decided: anyone who has an opinion makes their own map and distributes it to the cyclists participating in the Mass. Still other rides decide the route by consensus. The disorganized nature of the event allows it to largely escape clampdown by authorities who may view the rides as forms of parades or organized protest. Additionally, the movement is free from the structural costs associated with a centralized, hierarchical organization. In order for the event to function, the only requirement is a sufficient turn-out to create a "critical mass" of riders dense enough to occupy a piece of road to the exclusion of drivers of motorized vehicles. Authorities in New York, California and Oregon have expressed concern with the difficulty of coordinating with the riders, due to the lack of leadership.

Critical Mass rides vary greatly in many respects, including frequency and number of participants. For example, many small cities have monthly Critical Mass rides with fewer than twenty riders which offer safety in numbers to cyclists in those locales, while on the opposite extreme, in what have been the largest events using the name Critical Mass, cyclists in Budapest, Hungary hold only two rides each year on April 22 (Earth Day) and September 22 (International Car Free Day). The "Budapest style" attracts tens of thousands of riders. The April 20, 2008, Budapest ride participation was estimated at 80,000 riders. In Vienna, close to Budapest, a Critical Mass Ride has been held every month since 2006 and attracts up to 1,000 or more riders.

In the Critical Mass practice of "corking", a rider breaks away from the group to block the side streets of an intersection as the mass crosses. This prevents traffic travelling through the intersection on a green signal and allows the riders to ride through red lights. This both contains cross-traffic while the mass passes and protects the mass from splitting or from drivers who might attempt to pass through the mass.

Timelapse video of a Critical Mass in Chicago in 2009

== Other bicycling groups ==
=== Similar organizations and movements ===
The Critical Mass rides have inspired a number of other bicycle movements, that range from political movements to the "Critical Tits" ride during the yearly Burning Man festival. In Chicago, a movement has grown out of the Critical Mass community to promote winter cycling via the Bikewinter campaign. The extensive news coverage of San Francisco's July 1997 ride spawned an international celebration of bicycling, called Bike Summer. Kidical Mass originated in Oregon, and encourages bicycle riding for children and families. The movement gained momentum in North America and Europe and set a record in September 2019, when 1100 riders took part in Dortmund, Germany. "Critical Sass" was an all-female version of the ride in Baton Rouge, Louisiana, that took place the second Friday of every month. The Tweed Run (along with various other vintage bike rides) is a well dressed mass which takes place annually in a number of cities across the world. Examples of Critical Mass rides for political movements includes the Free Tibet Rides (May 2008): Free Tibet Critical Mass in Columbia, Missouri, "Tibetan Freedom Bike Rally" in San Francisco (Aug 2008), and in "Bike Ride for Tibet" in London (Aug 2008).

San Jose is the home to San Jose Bike Party. Bike Party rides on the third Friday of the month with a different starting point and route each time. Rides are typically 15–25 miles in length and usually 1000–2000 riders in Summer. The ride aims to build a community of cyclists and prove that bicycles can co-exist with cars. It is different than Critical Mass in that it rides after rush hour and obeys all traffic laws and has a pre-determined route.

San Luis Obispo, California, is the home of the "Bikes are happening..." meetup. Bikes are happening... starts at Mission Plaza at 9:30 pm on the first Thursday of the month. The ride consists of a continuous half mile loop through downtown San Luis Obispo. Since there is no permit for the ride, riders are asked to follow three rules: have fun, respect the community, and obey all traffic laws.

In Portland, Oregon a tactic called a "bike swarm" has been used by Occupy Wall Street protesters to separate marching protesters from police.

A huge bicycle demonstration is the "Fahrrad-Sternfahrt" in Berlin, Germany, since 1976. Each year in June and usually have 150.000–250.000 riders. Together the 19 rides are more than 600 miles long including two sections of motorway.

=== Critical Manners ===
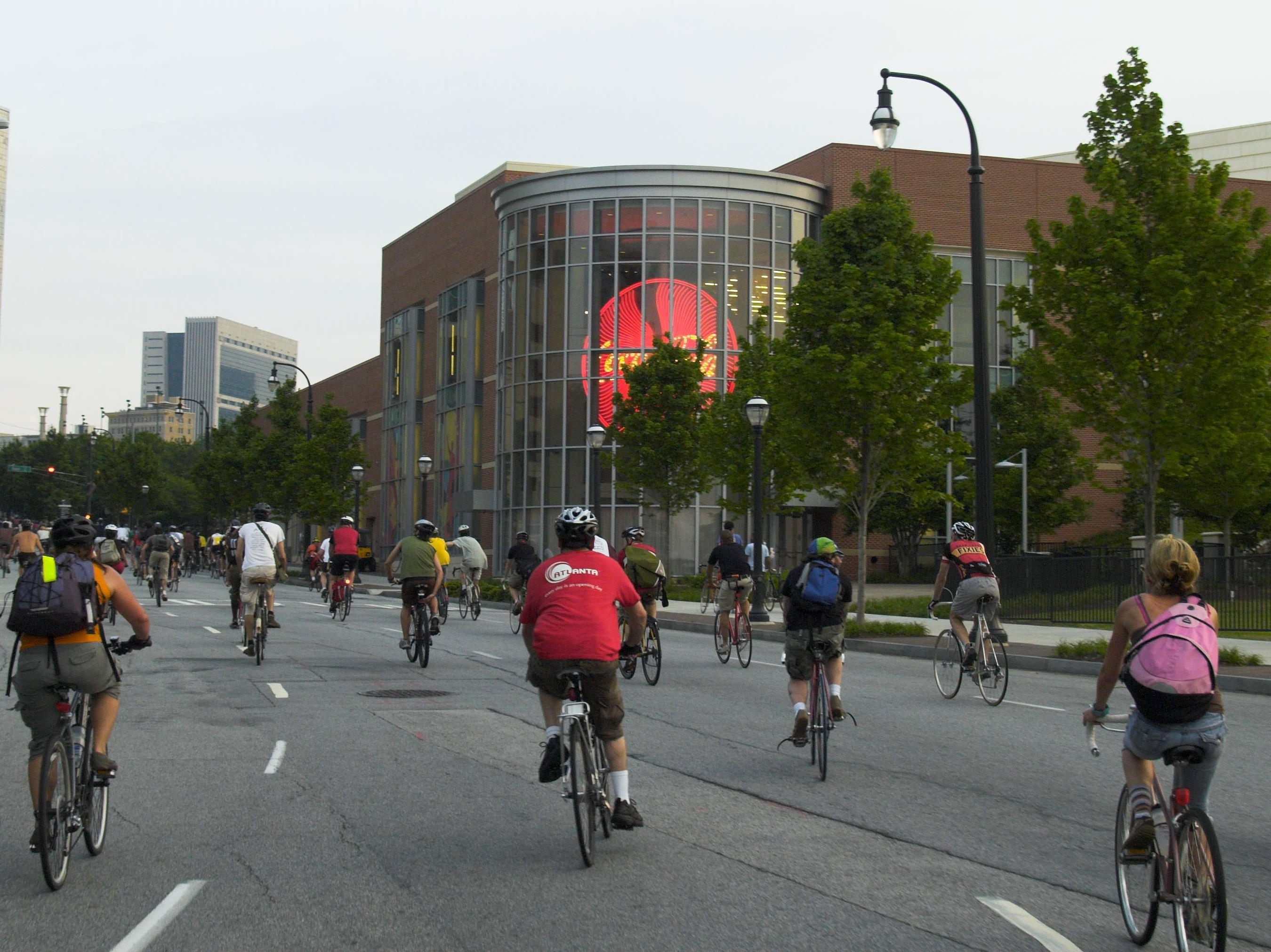
Critical Mass riders in Atlanta

In San Francisco, an event known as "Critical Manners" was created as a response to Critical Mass. Critical Manners rides through the city on the second Friday of the month, with riders encouraged to obey all traffic laws such as stopping at red lights and signaling. Tucson, Arizona holds the Tuesday Night Community Bike Ride as their alternative to Critical Mass. The weekly ride encourages bicycle commuting and motor vehicle awareness in a peaceful and friendly way.

In 2007 there were conversations about starting Critical Manners in Portland, Oregon. According to the Critical Mass book, a similar project known as Courteous Mass is described as "an alternative to Critical Mass."

An alternative ride named RideCivil formed in Seattle in late 2007. Rides are on the second Friday of every month, and focus on encouraging civility between motorists, pedestrians and cyclists.

The Mobile Social is an alternative ride in Atlanta sponsored by the Atlanta Bicycle Coalition. Rides start on 2nd Thursday of every month, meeting at Woodruff Park in downtown Atlanta and a focus on promoting local small business and cycling for commuting, social and civic engagement.

On June 12, 2009, an Indianapolis Critical Manners ride called "Courteous Mass" was launched but is no longer active as of 2016.

On August 14, 2009, there was a Critical Manners ride in Vancouver, British Columbia. The ride consisted of between 70 and 100 cyclists riding through the downtown core, making all attempts to follow the rules of the road (stopping at red lights / stop signs, using hand signals to turn, using the right-most lane or bike lane when applicable). The event generated some coverage in the local media and was generally deemed a success by the participants, although there were some criticisms. The ride only survived one outing.

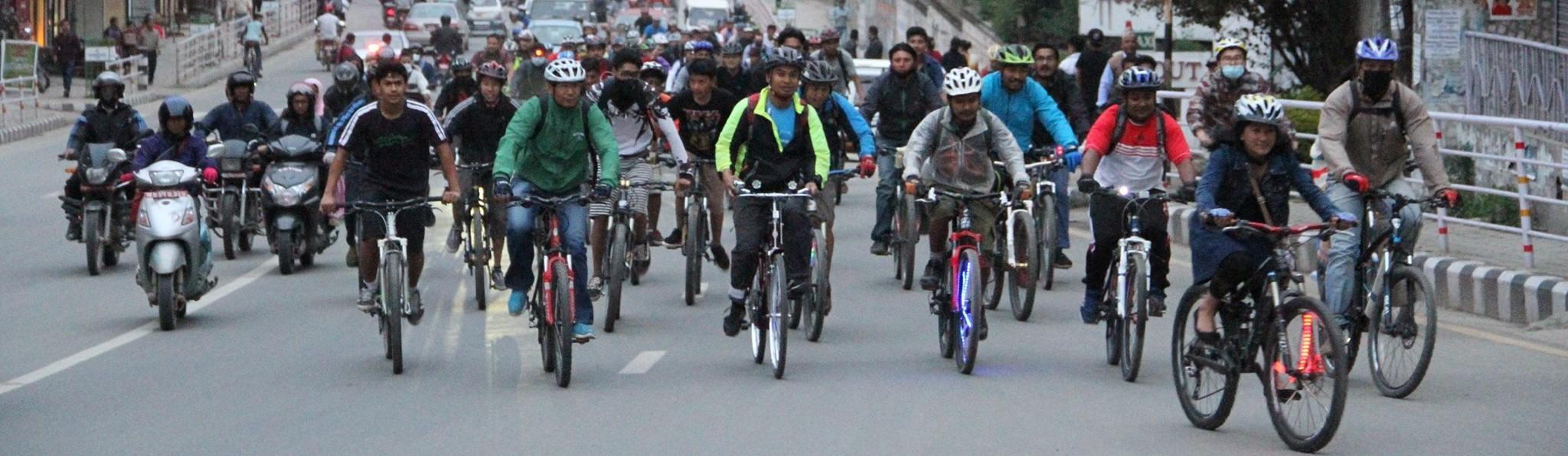
Critical Mass (Kathmandu, Nepal)

The event has been held in Kathmandu, Nepal, since April 2013. Cyclists gather at Kathmandu Durbar Square, Basantapur, and ride through the city. These gatherings sometimes include awareness programs. The Critical Mass gatherings continued after the April 2015 Nepal earthquake under the slogan "Quake or Shake, Sunny or Rainy, we have to flow with time for next smile..."

== Conflicts involving Critical Mass ==
Critical Mass rides have generated controversy and public opposition. The group has often protested in high-profile events, ranging from major political events to the Olympics. Some critics claim that Critical Mass is a deliberate attempt to obstruct traffic and disrupt normal city functions, asserting that individuals taking part refuse to obey traffic laws.

Some bicycling advocacy groups have expressed concern that the nature of Critical Mass and altercations with motorists could weaken public support for cyclists. Though it does not condone incidents of violence and rudeness, the San Francisco Bicycle Coalition credits Critical Mass with spotlighting bicycle issues and aiding their efforts in advocating for cyclists.

== Legal argument ==
In the UK, the question of whether a Critical Mass requires advance notification of the local police was tested in 2008 in a high-profile court case which went to the House of Lords (at the time effectively the highest court of appeal in the UK). In Kay (FC) v Commissioner of the Police of the Metropolis, the House of Lords ruled that Critical Mass was a procession which was "commonly or customarily held" and was thus in the scope of an exemption to the legal requirement for notification of the police.

== In Media ==
There are various pieces of media about Critical Mass, including:

We are Traffic! (1999 Film set in San Francisco, California)

Still we ride (2004 film set in New York, New York)

You Never Bike Alone (2006 film set in Vancouver, British Columbia)

Aftermass (2013 film set in Portland, Oregon)

== See also ==
- Bike bus
- Clothing-optional bike ride including World Naked Bike Ride
- Cyclability
- Cycle touring
- Flash mob
- Friday Night Skate
- Go Skateboarding Day
- Kidical Mass
- Outline of cycling
- Public transport
- Reclaim the Streets
- Ride of Silence
- San Jose Bike Party
- Time's Up!
- World Carfree Network
