= Muévete en Bici =

Active mobility program in Mexico City

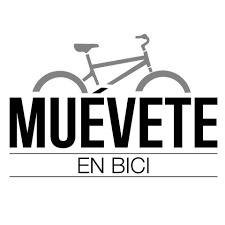

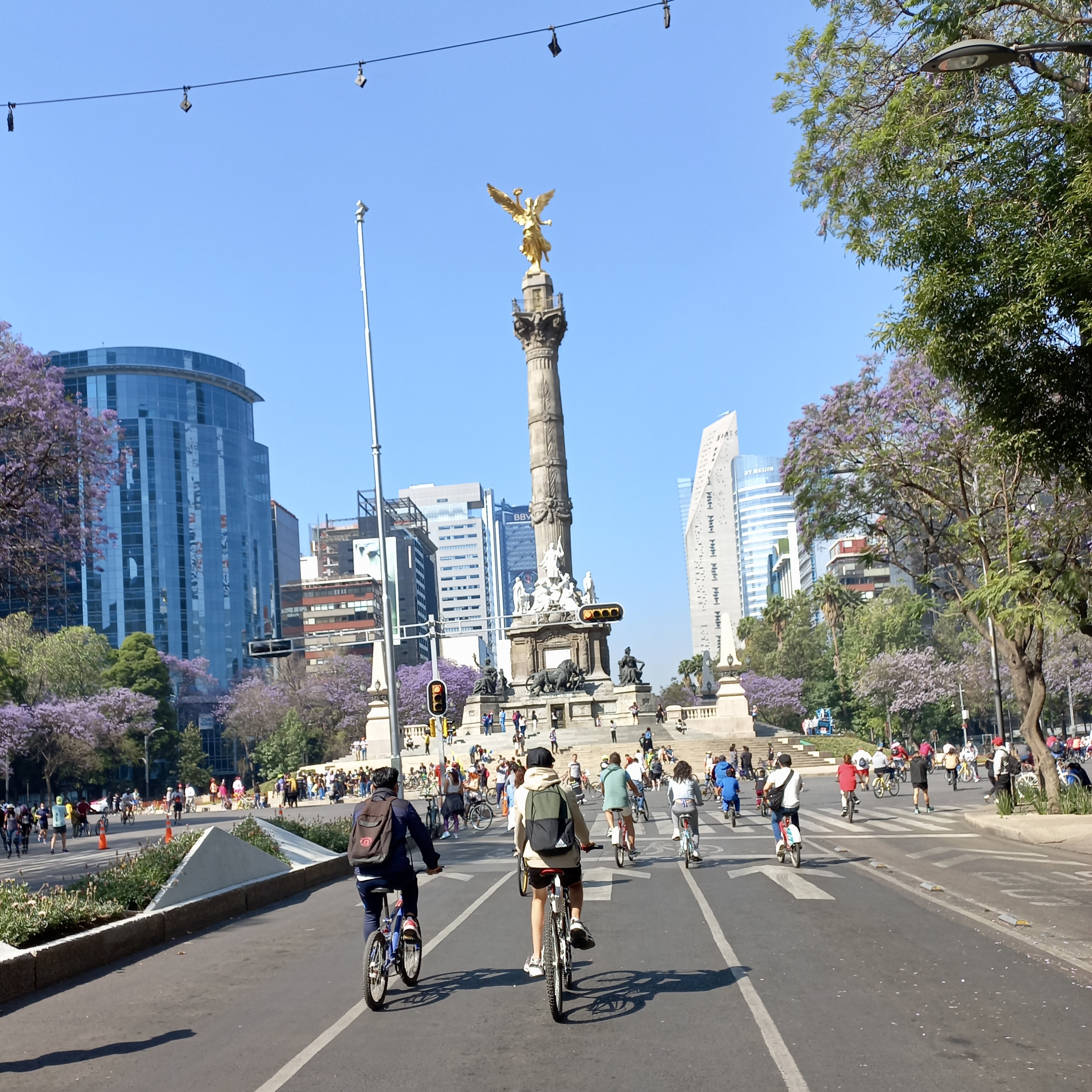
- Sunday bike ride on Paseo de la Reforma near the Angel of Independence roundabout
- Status: Ongoing
- Genre: Open-streets event
- Frequency: Weekly
- Location: Mexico City
- Country: Mexico
- Years active: 19
- Inaugurated: May 13, 2007
- Website: Official website

Muévete en Bici (Move by Bike, Get On Your Bike, or Move on Bikes in English) is an active mobility program in Mexico City. More than 20 million people annually participate in the open-streets events, with between 20,000 and 80,000 people participating weekly as public thoroughfares are closed to motor vehicles and therefore opened to all other travelers. Muévete currently uses 55 kilometres (34 mi) of roads through the center of the city. The program has become a popular way for tourists to take in the historic sites of Mexico City along Paseo de la Reforma.

Muévete is an example of a ciclorecreovía (or ciclovía recreativa), a temporary weekend or weeknight recreational bike path that is an intermediate step toward a comprehensive bicycle infrastructure in the Americas. The program is run by the Secretary of the Environment of the Federal District, created with the aim of promoting sustainable mobility (in general, the use of bicycles) and, therefore, improving air quality in Mexico City.

The primary program is Paseo Dominical (Sunday roads) the first three Sundays of the month from 8 a.m. to 2 p.m. Paseo de la Reforma is closed to car traffic with the purpose of allowing cyclists, skaters and pedestrians to move freely. Paseo Dominical occurs about 37 times a year. Ciclotón Familiar is the fourth Sunday of the month, same hours, with many more road closures as well as additional support infrastructure for riders. Night rides on Saturday evenings from 7 p.m. to 11 p.m. are called Paseo Nocturna.

The Ecobici system allows those without bikes to participate. The Environmental Secretariat also has bicycle loans.

== History ==
The first edition of Muévete en Bici was held on Sunday, May 13, 2007, as part of a push to make "change society so that the bicycle becomes a central element in the new plans for urban transportation, because it is clean, fast and enjoyable." Circa 2008, travel by bicycle had accounted for only 0.7 percent of trips by all Mexico City travel modes, and an average of 30 cyclists were killed annually by cars or trucks.

This first edition had a route of approximately 10 kilometres (6.2 mi), running from Paseo de la Reforma from Lieja to Zócalo.

Mayor Marcelo Ebrard created Muévete en Bici as part of a larger livability-sustainability initiative that included creating sandy "urban beaches" at public pools, outdoor movie screenings, increased traffic regulation, public security cameras, and a requirement that city workers commute by bicycle a least once a month. (Mayor Ebrard also biked to work, in solidarity.) During the pro-cycling Ebrard administration, bicycles were also permitted on mass transit (buses, subway cars) for the first time.

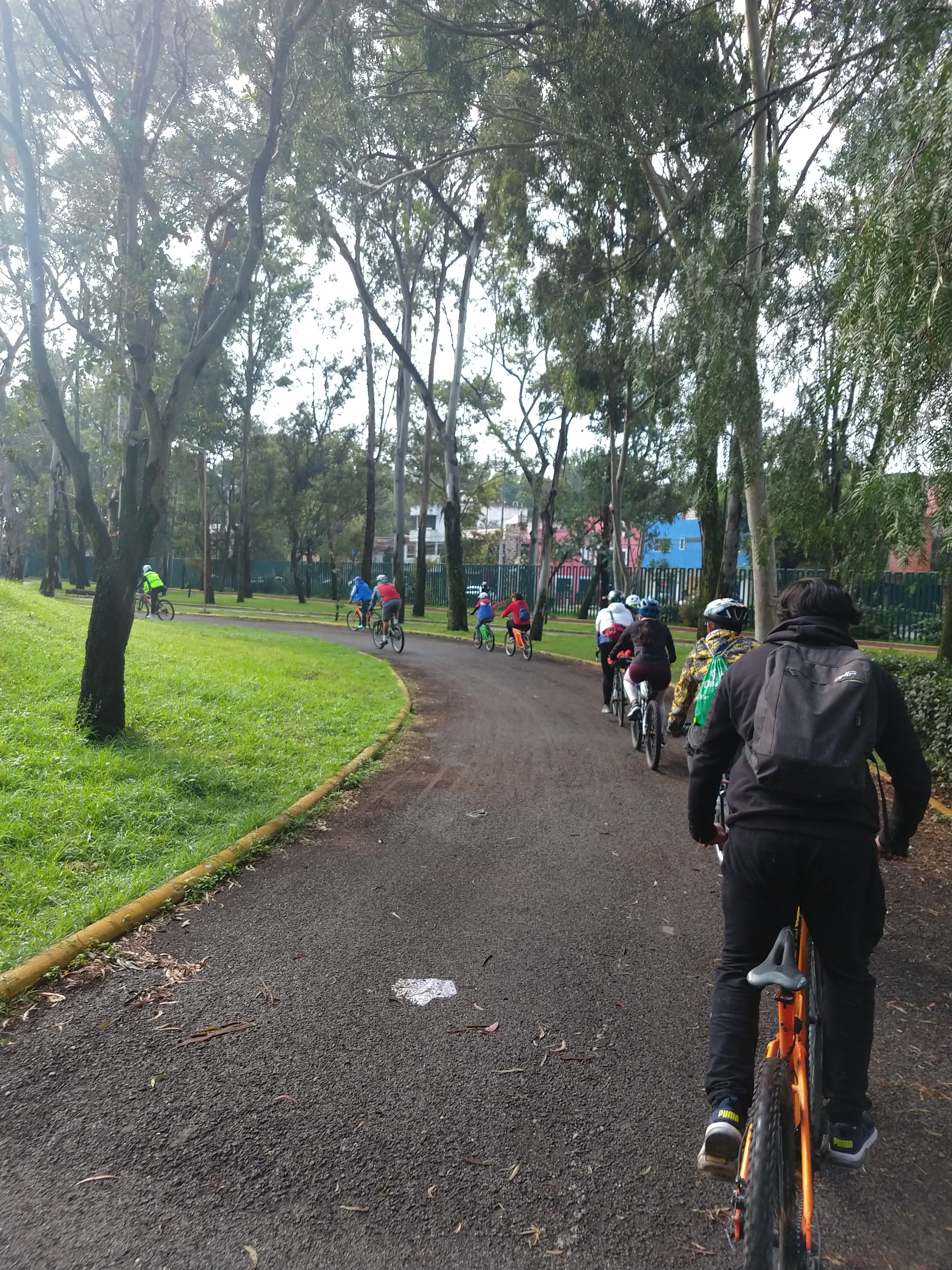
Sunday bikes in Parque Tezozómoc

The route has been extended multiple times throughout its history, and now includes Reforma from Chapultepec Park, to the area of La Villa and several other streets south through the neighborhoods of Colonia Roma, La Condesa, and Colonia del Valle.

In addition to the rides, Muévete en Bici carries out recreational and cultural activities with environmental education workshops, games, physical and sports activities, as well as the bike school. Along with bike-share program EcoBici, "Muévete en Bici [and] bike training programmes started in 2009 to teach a new generation not only how to cycle safely, but also that cycling is an effective, safe and low-cost means of transport, as well as a recreational activity. These programmes provided residents with a safe space in which to practise cycling, and also the opportunity to see what their city would be like without cars."

The program is jointly managed and funded by the municipal secretariats of environment, civic engagement, culture, and tourism, along with the Institute of the Youth, the Mexico City Police Department, and a roster of private commercial sponsors.

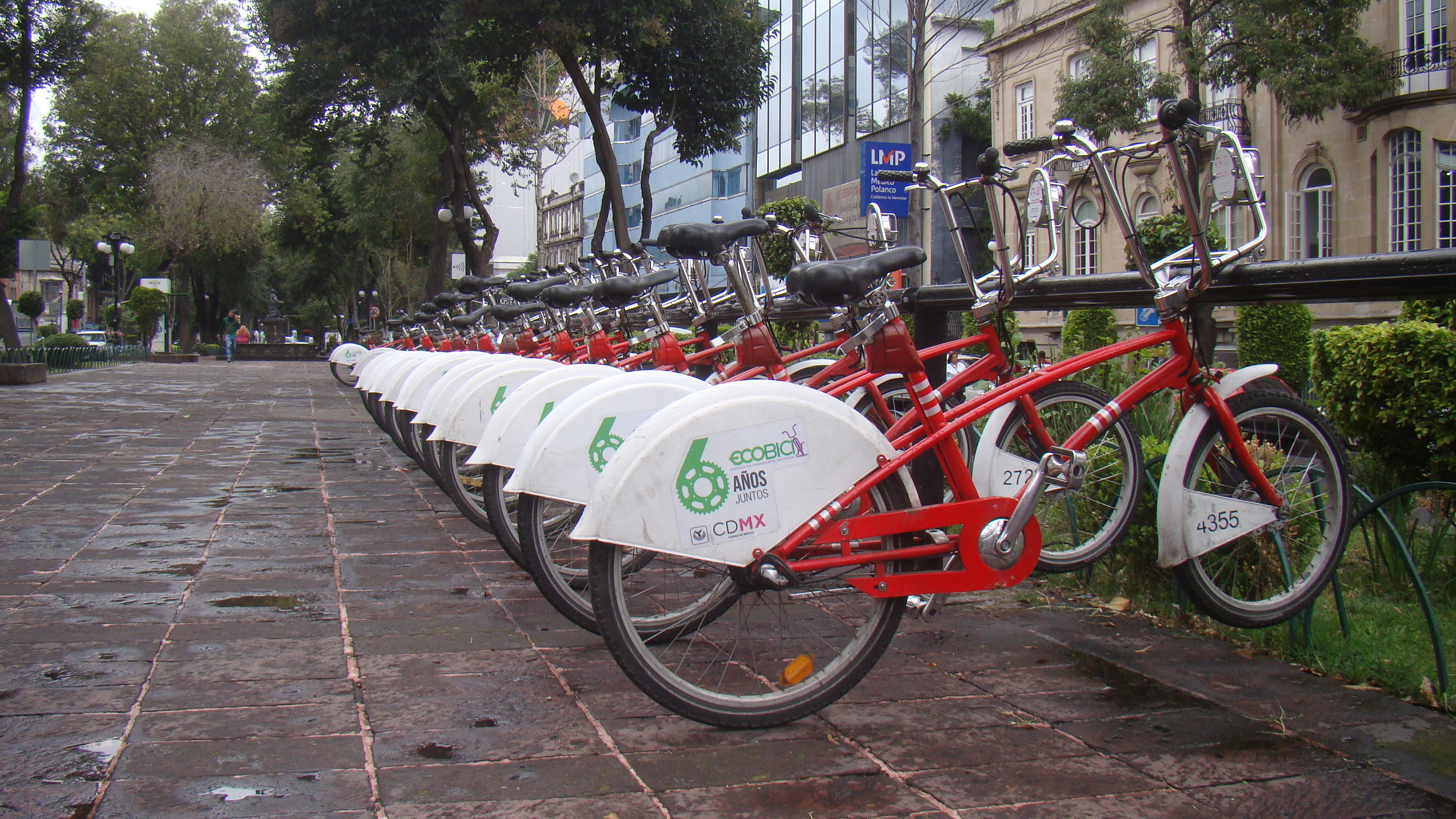
EcoBici rack on Avenida Álvaro Obregón

== Recognition, influence and criticism ==
Public health researchers found the Muévete en Bici program added "an extra 71 min/week of moderate-to-vigorous physical activity to more than 20,000 users." The United Nations has noted that the program, in addition to other programs and Ecobici bike rentals, have led to a significant increase in women using bikes for transportation in Mexico. In 2008, Muévete en Bici won the Pan-American Health Organisation's "Active Cities, Healthy Cities" award.

Organizers of DominGo! a Sunday open-streets event in Hartford, Connecticut, say they were inspired by Muévete en Bici and CicLAvia in Los Angeles. (Domingo is the Spanish word for Sunday.)

Mexico City is a member of the Red de Ciclovías Recreativas de las Américas (Recreational Cycle Routes of the Americas Network) along with Bogotá (Ciclovía), Chacao, Chicago, Guadalajara (Vía RecreActiva), Guatemala City, Medellín, Quito (Ciclopaseo), Rio de Janeiro, San Borja and Santiago (CicloRecreoVía), et al.

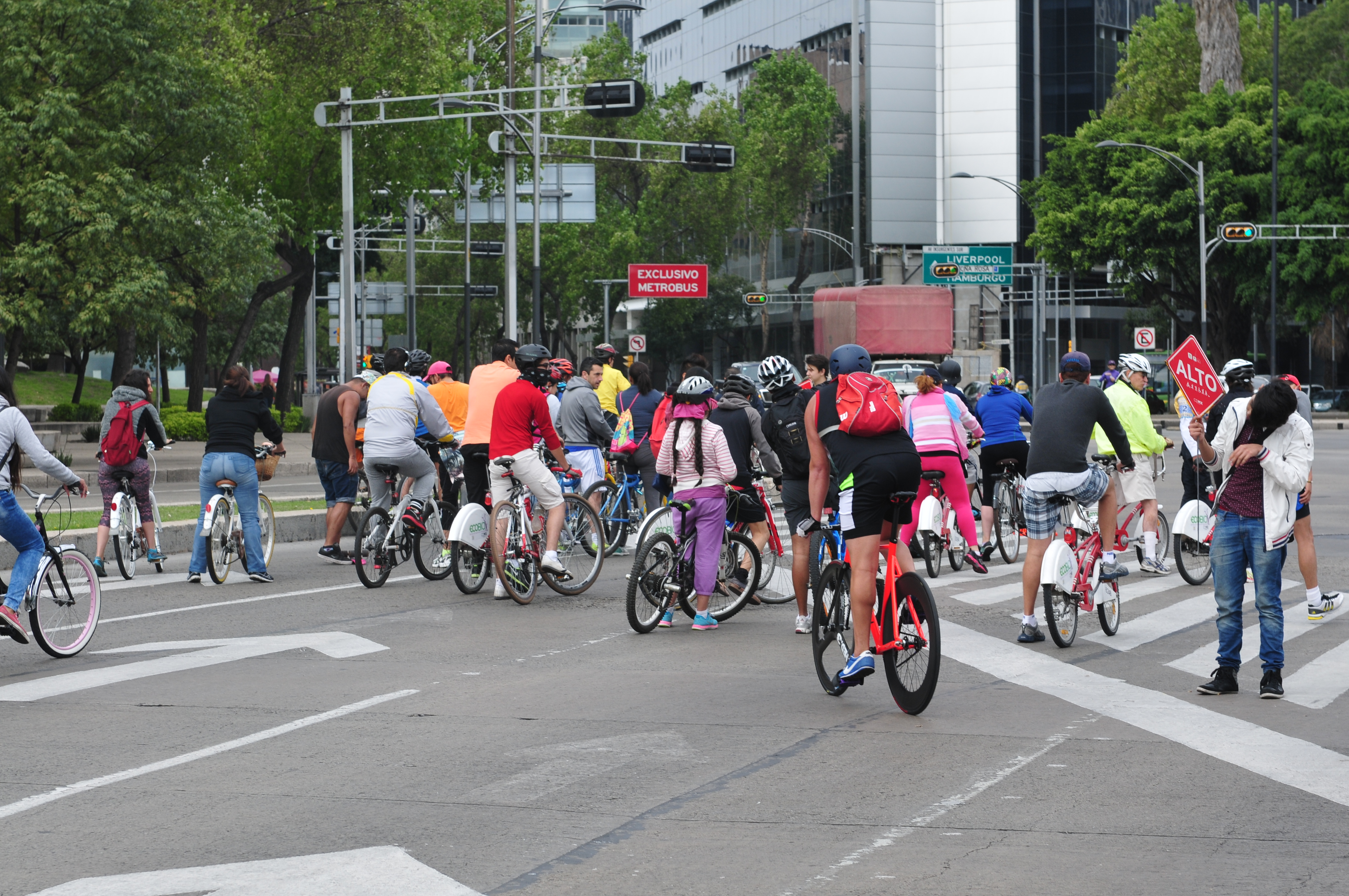
Paseo Dominical in downtown Mexico City

One scholar has challenged the Muévete en Bici system as "limited by a consensus that maintained existing power inequalities, favored expert-driven design targeting middle-class users, and opted for rapid project implementation over long-term institutional re-design and capacity-building" and suggested that Mexico City's innovation have failed to implement solutions for the bicycle-dependent residents of low-income neighborhoods.

== See also ==
- Ciclovia in the United States
- Ciclopaseo in Quito, Ecuador
