= Ciclovia in the United States =

Open-streets car-free festivals

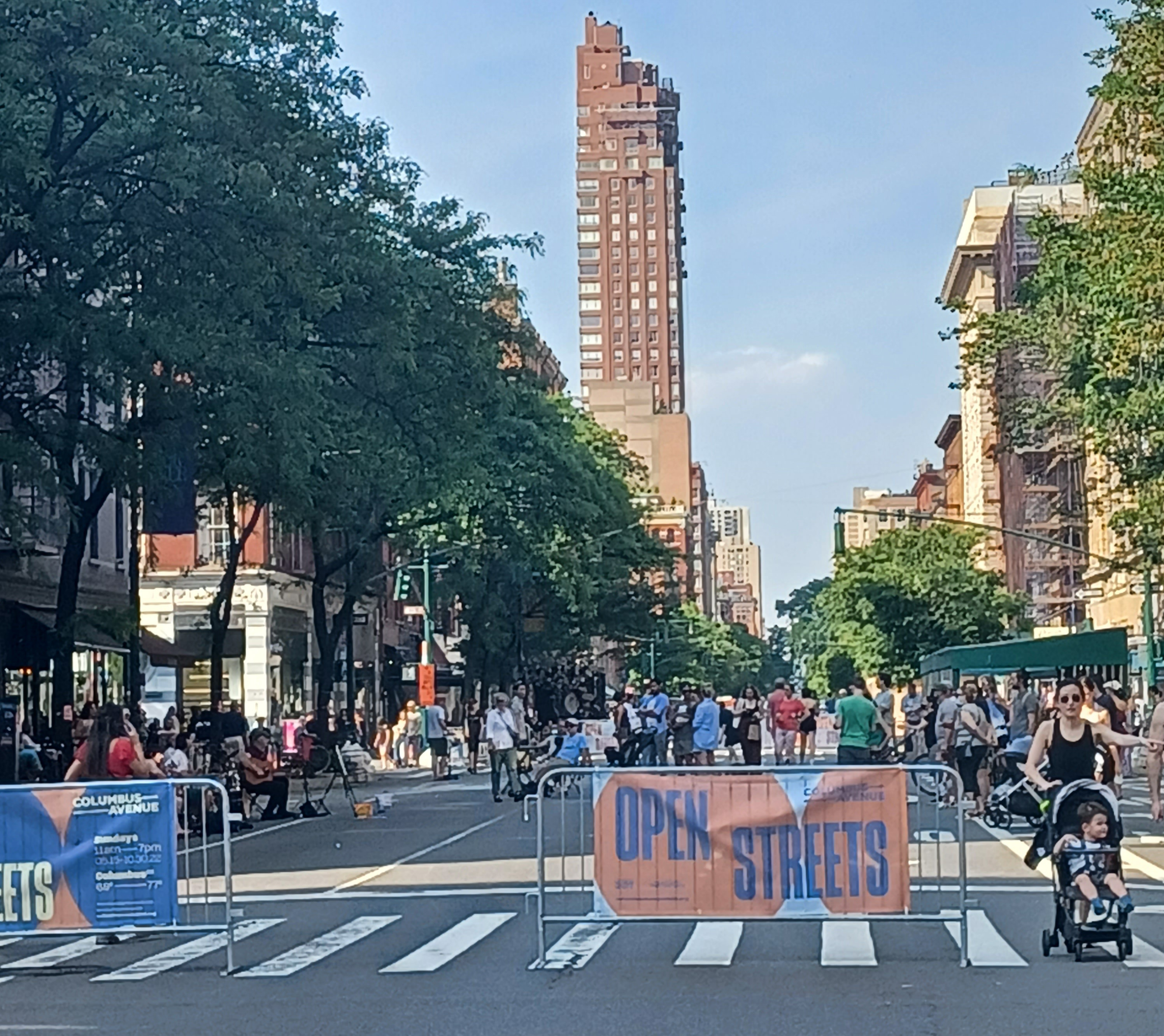
An open streets event in New York City in 2022

Ciclovia in the United States are scheduled open-streets car-free festivals in various American cities. The ciclovía concept originated in Bogotá, Colombia but is more commonly known as open streets in the US.

== List of American ciclovia ==
- Albuquerque, New Mexico held its first CiQlovía on September 21, 2014, and has since become an annual fall event with a different route each year. Programming has included healthy living, educational, and recreational activities including a bike rodeo, climbing wall, yoga and dance classes, artisan vendors and non-profit information tables, live music, and food trucks.
- Atlanta, Georgia held its first ciclovia called Atlanta Streets Alive on May 23, 2010. Automobile closures, totaling just under 2 miles (3.2 km), included Edgewood and Auburn Avenues in Downtown Atlanta. Approximately 6,000 people attended. Atlanta has continued to host a series of streets events closed to cars. Over 100,000 people attended an event in 2014.

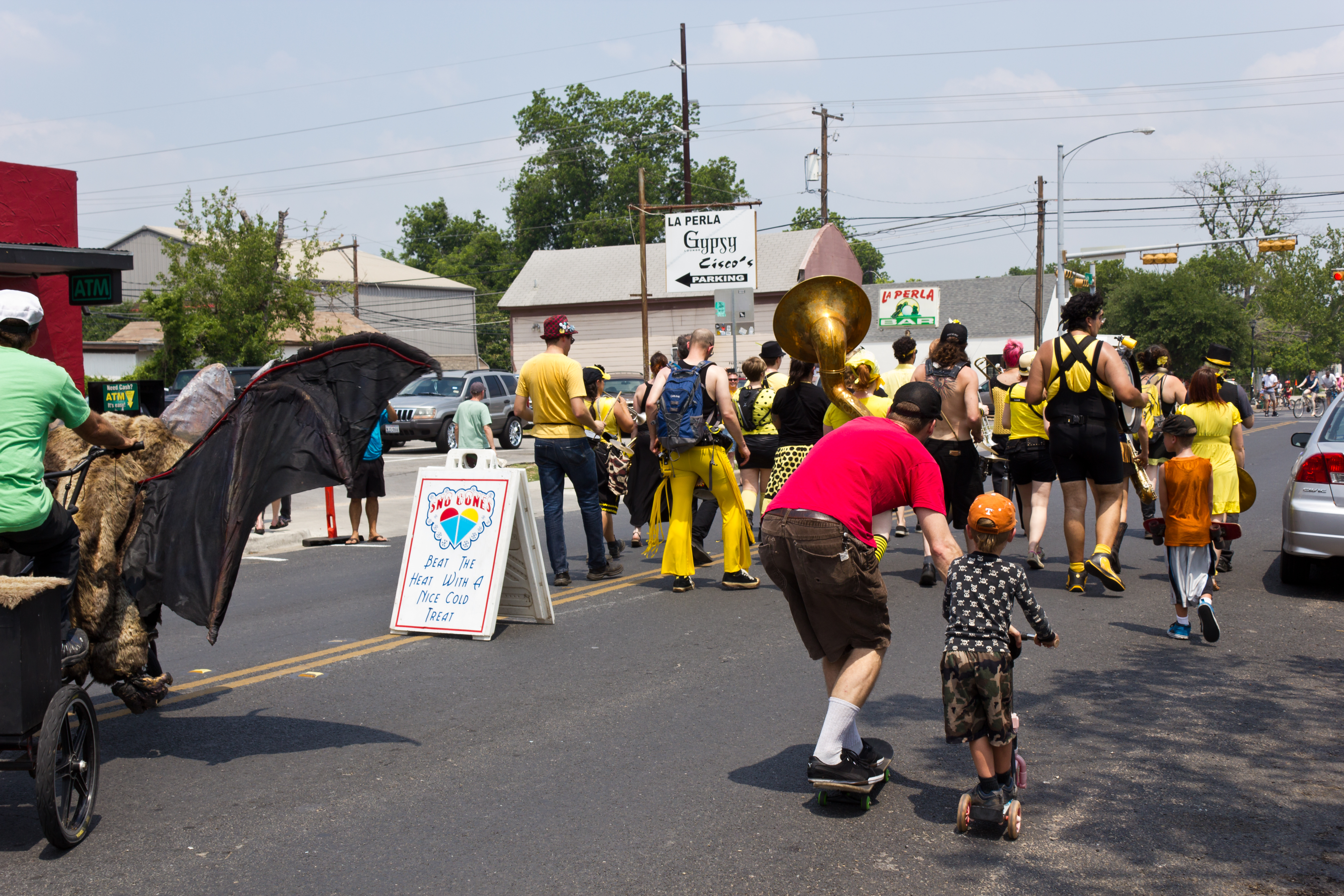
Viva Streets 2013, in Austin

- Austin, Texas hosted its first ciclovia event on May 20, 2012, called "Viva! Streets Austin".
- Baltimore, Maryland hosts regular Ciclovias.
- Boston hosts Open Streets Boston since 2022, which is an expansion of the former Open Newbury Street.
- Brownsville, Texas hosts a number of ciclovias every year, entitled "CycloBia" where a 2-mile route is planned and coordinated by the local City government.
- Cambridge, Massachusetts has opened Memorial Drive to bicycle and pedestrian traffic only on Sundays from April to November since 1976.
- Charlotte, North Carolina hosts a ciclovia named Open Streets 704 on three Sundays of October.
- Chicago, Illinois planned a ciclovia for two Sundays in October 2008. Once a year almost the entire 30-mile length of Chicago's major non-highway busiest street, Lake Shore Drive, is turned over to bicycle-only traffic in the morning, called Bike The Drive.
- Clearwater, Florida hosted Sunday Ciclovía on March 1, 2009, and again on April 26, 2009, after the first event was cancelled due to severe weather. The event was initiated by the city's East Gateway District in downtown to encourage social interaction and community building among diverse population groups. Sunday Ciclovía hours were 8 am to 2 pm and the route was 2 miles (3.2 km) in length.
- Cleveland, Ohio hosted two ciclovia-type events in August 2006 which were attended by approximately 10,000 people. The event was spearheaded by two individuals, Lois Moss and Julia Sutter, and was funded by a grant from the Cleveland Foundation's Civic Innovation Lab. In 2007, Walk+Roll Cleveland coordinated five community street-closing events and in 2008 the Walk+Roll program expanded to Lakewood, Ohio. For 2009, Walk+Roll is being held in two additional Cleveland neighborhoods. The events have been held on Saturdays and on Sundays and are generally in the mid-day rather than very early mornings. Additionally, the Walk+Roll organization has been helping communities all across the U.S. by providing guidance, information and consulting services on how to bring ciclovias to new locations.
- Denver, Colorado, plays host to Viva Streets Denver, created by non-profits LiveWell Colorado and BikeDenver. Since 2011, the 1-day, car-free event in August each year has attracted 10,000 residents. The event has taken place in Park Hill (2011, 2012) and the Berkeley Regis neighborhood (2013). The goal of Viva Streets is to introduce the public to the many benefits that come from increased walking and biking in local communities, and highlight safe and active transportation.
- Durham, North Carolina started its first ciclovia in 2010. Bull City Summer Streets
- El Paso, Texas ran a ciclovía each Sunday in May 2007. The program has since been renamed Scenic Sundays (the events occur on Scenic Drive) and runs April through August.
- Fort Collins, Colorado hosted two Open Streets events along two miles of Remington Street in 2015, on June 7 and September 20.
- Fort Worth, Texas held Open Streets Fort Worth on October 23, 2011, on Magnolia, 5th Avenue, and Allen, and on October 30, 2011, on South Main, Broadway, and Jennings.
- Honolulu, Hawaii hosted the state's first Cyclovia "Hele On Kailua" in 2012, which is now an annual event.
- Houston, Texas has hosted six "Sunday Streets Houston" from June to December 2014 on various streets around Inner Loop neighborhoods of town.
- Henderson, Nevada hosted the "Henderson Stroll 'n Roll" in 2014
- Ithaca, New York started hosting bi-annual "Streets Alive! Ithaca" in 2012.
- Irvine, California held its first CicloIrvine on May 4, 2024
- Las Cruces, New Mexico started holding ciclovîas on the last Sunday of each month, starting in March 2008. They were held at the city's Meerscheidt Recreation Center in 2008, and in 2009 moved to Young Park. Activities include biking, walking, dance, Wii, Bungee Run, aerobics, and weight training. The Las Cruces ciclovías are put on by a partnership of the New Mexico Department of Health, New Mexico State University's Southern Area Health Education Center, the Cooperative Extension Service from NMSU's College of Agriculture and Home Economics, the City of Las Cruces, Southern New Mexico Diabetes Outreach, and the Doña Ana County Diabetes Action Coalition.

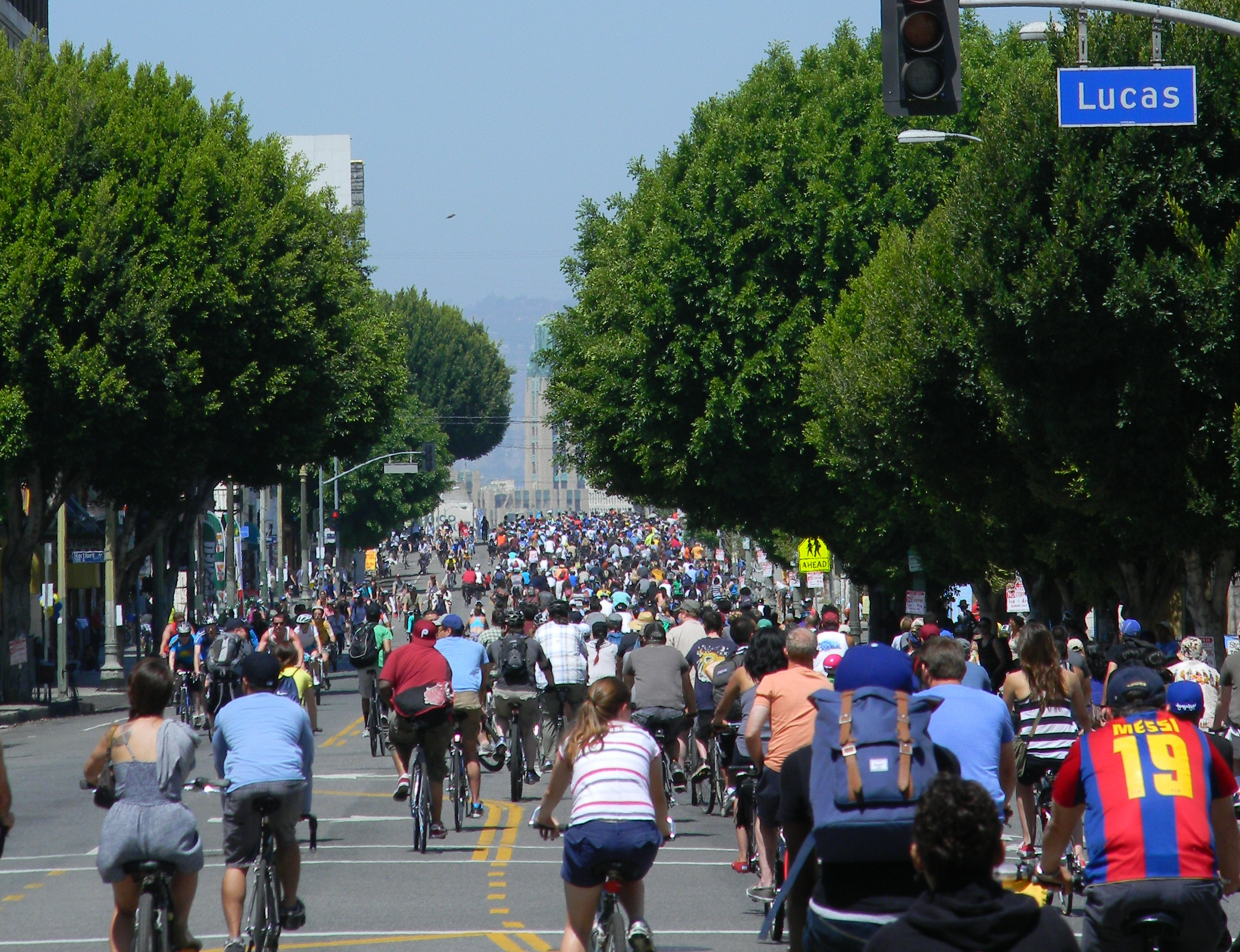
The first "Iconic Wilshire" CicLAvia. Los Angeles, CA June 23, 2013.

- Los Angeles, California had its first CicLAvia on October 10, 2010, starting at 10:10 a.m. CicLAvias have been held two to three times a year ever since with an expanding variety of routes. The 40th CicLAvia event took place in August 2022.
- Lincoln, Nebraska hosts an annual "Streets Alive!" event with health-related vendors and entertainers along the route.
- Louisville, Kentucky hosts an annual event. cycLOUvia
- Madison, Wisconsin has continued to host the event twice each year since its first "Ride the Drive" event in August 2009. A circular path of streets is closed to automobile traffic and residents are encouraged to bike, walk, or rollerblade the loop. Family fun and fitness activities are offered at parks and businesses along the route.
- Miami, Florida held its first ciclovia, called Bike Miami, in 2008, as part of the City of Miami's Bicycle Action Plan. The event was created and hosted by the then-mayor, Manny Diaz, who decided to make it a monthly event. On March 14, 2009, the City of Miami became the first US city to host 5 cyclovias. The monthly event, called Bike Miami Days, is supposed to promote livable streets and community as well as cycling and walking.
- Minneapolis, Minnesota held its first Open Streets event in 2011, with the second in the following year.
- New Brunswick, NJ hosted its first ciclovia event on October 6, 2013, and is continuing to hold future ciclovia events.
- New York City currently runs a yearly ciclovia called Summer Streets. Started in 2008, it opens over 400 blocks to pedestrians and cyclists every Saturday in August from 7 AM to 3 PM, alternating boroughs on some weekends.
- Pittsburgh, Pennsylvania and the non-profit organization Bike Pittsburgh run OpenStreetsPGH three times each summer, typically opening up 4–5 miles of streets for bicyclists and pedestrians in different neighborhoods.
- Portland, Oregon has run several ciclovia, called "Sunday Parkways", having undertaken their first one on June 22, 2008, three in 2009, and five in 2010. The City continues to host five Sunday Parkways events each year, one each month beginning in May. The event is from 11 a.m. to 4 p.m. and takes place in a different neighborhood each month of the summer through to September.
- Roanoke, Virginia held its first Ciclovia in 2009.
- Salinas, California has hosted a youth-organized and -led Ciclovia since 2013.
- San Antonio, Texas has held several such events.
- San Francisco, California hosted its first Ciclovia-styled events in 2008. Sunday Streets San Francisco has grown to 10 yearly events 1–4 miles in length taking place in different areas of the city, with a focus on neighborhoods lacking open space and access to affordable recreation. Run by the nonprofit Livable City, Sunday Streets is presented in partnership with city agencies and regularly partners with community and cultural organizations to host events within the car-free Sunday Streets routes. Sunday Streets serves approximately 100,000 people with 15 miles of open space yearly.
- San Jose, California hosted its inaugural Ciclovia type event on October 11, 2015. Deemed Viva CalleSJ, the free event closed six miles of San Jose city streets to cars, and brought the community out to walk, bike, skate, play and explore the city like never before.
- San Mateo County, California holds an event named "Streets Alive San Mateo County"—participating cities include Belmont, Brisbane, Foster City, Millbrae, North Fair Oaks, Redwood City, San Mateo, and South San Francisco. See http://streetsalivesmc.org/ for more information.
- South Padre Island, Texas held its first Cyclovia So Padre event on May 2, 2015. It included closing down Padre Boulevard to cars, which is the main avenue of travel along the island.
- Spokane, Washington held Summer Parkways on July 11 and August 22, 2010. The events were presented jointly by the city, The Parks and Recreation Department, and the SpokeFest Association. It linked downtown Riverfront Park with Corbin Park, up Howard Street, for a total of 3 miles (4.8 km) of car-free activities.
- St. Petersburg, Florida held Open Streets St. Pete in 2016, 2017 and 2018. The event has taken place in three locations in downtown St. Petersburg, with the latest being Albert Whitted Park and the surrounding waterfront area. The events were held on Sundays, and the roads were closed to vehicular traffic and included activities along the route, food trucks and music.
- Tucson, Arizona held its first Cyclovia Tucson event on April 18, 2010. It included the closure to motor vehicles of portions of four main bicycle arteries (4th Ave, university/3rd St, Mountain and Seneca), along with a variety of activities along the route.
- Wayne County, Michigan has held ciclovias on the Edward N. Hines Parkway since 1983. Called "Saturday in the Park", six miles (9.7 km) of the parkway are closed to motorized vehicles between Outer Drive Road and Ann Arbor Trail. These events are held from 9:00 a.m. to 3:30 p.m. on every Saturday from May through September. Edward N. Hines was Chief Consul of the League of American Wheelmen (Bicyclists) Michigan Division during the 1890s and one of the most important innovators in road development.
- Wichita, Kansas – Open Streets ICT: A recurring “open streets” event in which key thoroughfares (notably Douglas Avenue, among others) are closed to vehicular traffic and opened to walking, biking, fitness, public art, and vendors. The route has run from the Downtown area eastward through the Douglas Design District to Hillside, and includes multiple “activity hubs” along the way.

== See also ==
- Muévete en Bici (Mexico City open streets event)
- Ciclopaseo in Quito, Ecuador
