= Protests against gentrification in Mexico City =

2025 protests in Mexico

- Protesters burning a cardboard FIFA Cup during a protest against gentrification in Mexico City.
- Location: Mexico City, Mexico

Since July 4, 2025, a series of protests against gentrification have taken place in Mexico City.

== Aims ==
The marches are a response to the gentrification of the city, particularly driven by foreigners who have flocked to the capital since the COVID-19 pandemic. The protest against a trend that is affecting urban centers and driving a large portion of the poor and local population out to the periphery is imbued with the added tensions that have been a hallmark of the bilateral relationship between Mexico and the United States.

Anti-gentrification activists say thousands of people in the Mexican capital have been forced out of their homes in recent years as tourists and remote workers, many of whom are believed to be American, take over popular neighborhoods like Roma and Condesa. They perceive the US as driving gentrification.

== Events ==
The first protest began in the Roma and Condesa neighborhoods on July 4, 2025, the second in the Tlalpan borough on July 20, 2025, and the third between the Juárez Hemicycle and the United States embassy building on Paseo de la Reforma Avenue on July 26, 2025.

Some protesters have used anti-American slogans. Physical attacks against people perceived as foreigners and acts of vandalism against private property marked the earlier demonstrations. Protesters smashed windows at businesses, including a Starbucks, and spray-painted messages like "Get out of Mexico" on damaged storefronts. At least one demonstrator wrote "Kill the Gringos" in black spray paint. Other anti-American graffiti appeared written on walls, such as "gringo go home" and "go back to your fucking país (country) gringo." Activists also destroyed a roadside advert for Walmart on July 20.

== Government responses ==
Mexico City's government secretary, César Cravioto, urged an end to violent marches with "xenophobic" messages. Mexico City's head of government, Clara Brugada, recognized the problems that gentrification has caused, but argued that the campaign against gentrification should not become an excuse for discrimination or "xenophobic expression against migrants."

President Claudia Sheinbaum condemned anti-immigration language used by some demonstrators, saying that "The xenophobic displays seen at that protest have to be condemned. No one should be able to say 'any nationality get out of our country' even over a legitimate problem like gentrification." Eduardo Alanís from the Anti-Gentrification Front pushed back against xenophobia claims, stating that "the reason we've gathered here is precisely to hear the thoughts of many victims, mainly young people today, for whom it's almost impossible to live, to find housing." Another spokesperson for the movement stated: "We are not against migration because gentrification is not a problem of migration (which is) a human right. We are against violence as a government model."

== U.S. Government Response ==
The U.S. Department of Homeland Security highlighted the July 5, 2025, protests on their official X (formerly Twitter) page. The official account also encouraged illegal immigrants interested in joining the protests to self-deport. At the time, US ICE raids were occurring and prompting protests across the US, including in Los Angeles.
