= Open Streets ICT =

Recurring open streets event in Wichita, Kansas

- Cyclists and pedestrians along Douglas Avenue during Open Streets ICT in downtown Wichita (2023)
- Status: Active
- Frequency: Annual (with additional seasonal events)
- Locations: Wichita, Kansas, United States
- Years active: 2017–present
- Attendance: 30,000 (2024)
- Website: openstreetsict.com

Open Streets ICT is a recurring ciclovía event held in Wichita, Kansas, United States. The program began in 2017 and temporarily closes major city streets to motor vehicle traffic, opening them for pedestrians, cyclists, and recreational use. Activities along the route include live music, fitness classes, food vendors, and community organization booths.

== History ==
Open Streets ICT was launched in September 2017 by the City of Wichita with support from community organizations and sponsors. The first event took place along Douglas Avenue, attracting an estimated 14,000–15,000 participants.

The program became an annual event, and in 2019 more than 30,000 people participated. Additional spring and neighborhood editions have since been introduced, including events in the NoMar district and near Wichita State University.

== Attendance ==
Attendance at Open Streets ICT has grown steadily since its launch. Estimates published by the City of Wichita and local media are shown below:

Attendance history of Open Streets ICT
Year	Estimated attendance	Notes
2017	14,000–15,000	First event held September 24 along Douglas Avenue.
2018	30,000+	Expanded route to Hillside Avenue.
2019	30,000+	Growth led to recognition as one of Wichita’s largest community events.
2020	Cancelled	Event cancelled due to the COVID-19 pandemic.
2021	20,000+	Scaled-back fall event after pandemic cancellation.
2022	30,000+	Described as one of Wichita’s largest civic gatherings.
2023	25,000+	Event held along Douglas and in the NoMar district.
2024	30,000 (record)	City of Wichita reported record turnout.

== Route ==
The main event takes place along a four-mile stretch of Douglas Avenue, running from the Arkansas River in downtown eastward through the Douglas Design District to Hillside Avenue. Additional Open Streets ICT events have been held in north Wichita (along 21st Street), in the NoMar district, and at Wichita State University.

== Activities ==
Open Streets ICT features fitness classes such as yoga and Zumba, live performances by local musicians, food trucks, children’s activities, and temporary art installations. Businesses along the route often extend their hours and operate sidewalk sales to coincide with the event.

== Reception and recognition ==
Local media have described Open Streets ICT as one of Wichita’s signature community events, highlighting its scale and inclusive atmosphere.

In 2020, the event was recognized by the Kansas Recreation and Park Association with an award for innovative community programming.

== See also ==
- Ciclovía
- Ciclovia in the United States
- Douglas Design District
- Downtown Wichita
