= Gentrification of Mexico City =

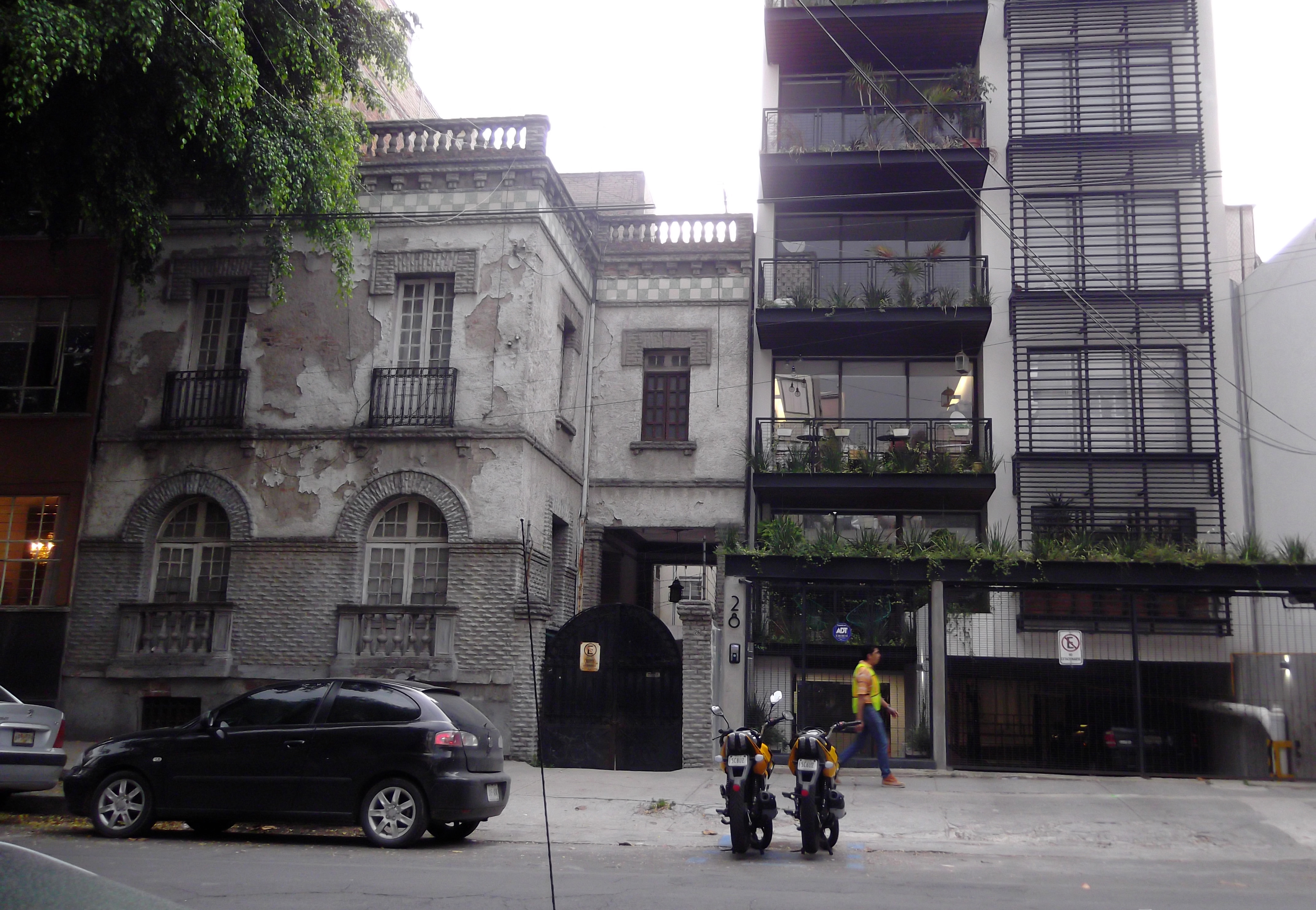
A deliberately delayed paintjob-requiring early 20th-century building beside an ultra-modern loft tower in Mexico City's Colonia Roma

Mexico City has massively been expanding its urban fabric and population density, becoming the fifth largest city in the world. A combination of neoliberal policies, complex geographic location, socio-economic disparities and inefficient strategies have influenced the process of gentrification in the city. The combination of numerous megaprojects, inefficient city-planning strategies, and remote work after the COVID-19 pandemic have led to dysfunctions in circulation, community allocation and equal access to resources. In consequence, middle and low-income communities have been directly or indirectly alienated and challenged to adapt to a complex and evolving urban environment, and the culture erasure that comes with the process of gentrification.

== History of Mexico City's development ==
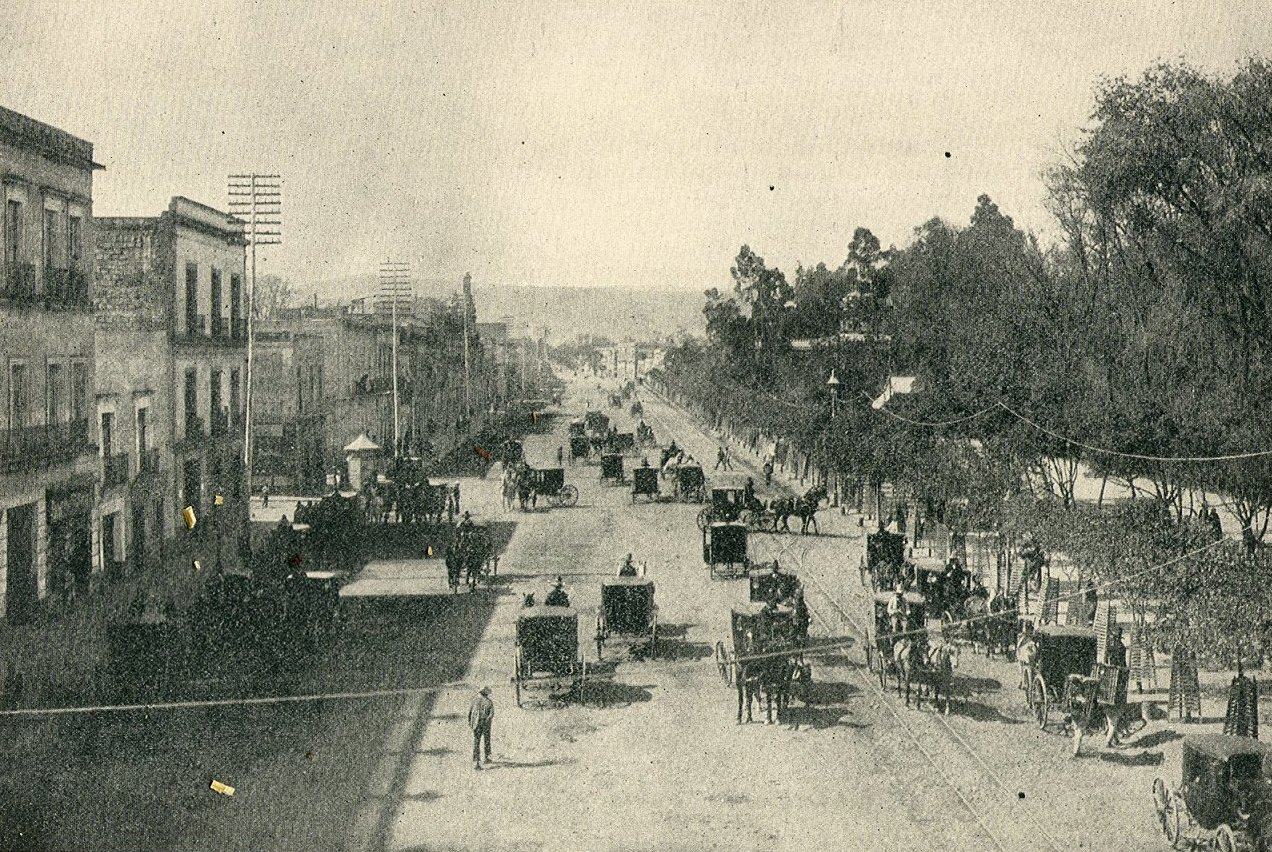
Mexico City view, c. 1890

The history of Mexico City starts with Tenochtitlan, a Mexica settlement built around 1325 A.D in the Valley of Mexico. Developed as a series of artificial islands on a lake, the village was connected by a system of channels, surrounding the Chapultepec aqueduct that served as the main resource of fresh water and therefore as the foundation for the evolution of the settlement. The Mexica Empire quickly grew after gaining control over surrounding land reaching a size of around 15 km2 and a population of around a million inhabitants. These people lived in low houses made of adobe, commonly attached to chinampas for cultivation. The dwellings were shared among families and grouped around a courtyard creating a diversity of neighborhoods that surrounded the central public buildings around the Templo Mayor. The main areas defined by the empire (Tepeyac, Tlacopan, Coyoacán, Iztapalapa and Texcoco) continue to be part of the modern city. The social divisions according to family status, wealth, occupation, age and gender were also already culturally predominant and influential to the architecture and urban planning of the time. For example, elites (or European settlers) often lived in large dwellings called haciendas while the rest of the indigenous communities would survive in small lots built informally.

The development of Mexico City as the urban environment that we recognize today, started to take shape with the arrival of the Cortes, the Spanish conqueror, to Tenochtitlan in 1519. When the Aztec Empire led by Moctezuma was overthrown, the Spaniards took control over the planning and organization of the city. The division of blocks in a grid, around a central plaza approached through four main streets created a practical layout that helped the Spaniards retain control, administer the division of lots, and maintain a unity of consolidated power. The placement of authority buildings, religious institutions and economic and social spaces, emphasized the plaza as the physical, cultural and commercial starting point of the city. The standardization of architecture and the creation of an urban fabric through a network of diverse settlements also speaks to the sense of permanence and expansion that the conquerors aspired. The construction of new sites was incentivized by giving the Spanish first settlers a status of urban elite and political power that would be carried throughout generations. The Ordinances of the Indies by Philip II, laid the ground for the founding of towns in the New World, following a set of strict rules of spatial arrangements and hierarchies, inspired by the Roman classical planning ideas. In this system of acquired wealth, other modes of exploitation came along such as forced labor, expropriation of land, control over mineral resources, imposition of high prices for goods and taxes, as well as more complex systems like the encomienda and latifundia, often related to the implementation of Christianity.

As the Spanish institutions generated wealth for the Spanish crown, the Mexican population experienced an extreme inequality, unable to benefit from its economic potential. From the Independence in 1821 to the Mexican Revolution in 1910, disparities among social groups persist and political instability is fostered through multiple dictatorships, corruption and rotations of power. Monopolies run by elites are supported by the government, while the majority of the population is left with inefficient public services with no access to education or economic incentives and little to no agency over how the country is run. The Industrial Revolution empowers the nation with economic growth based on the exportation of goods and external investments, yet the distribution of wealth remains centralized. This affects how the city is physically developing around a core, cultivating density of population, as well as a massive urban expansion that reflects its sudden economic and cultural global presence.

== Urban development ==
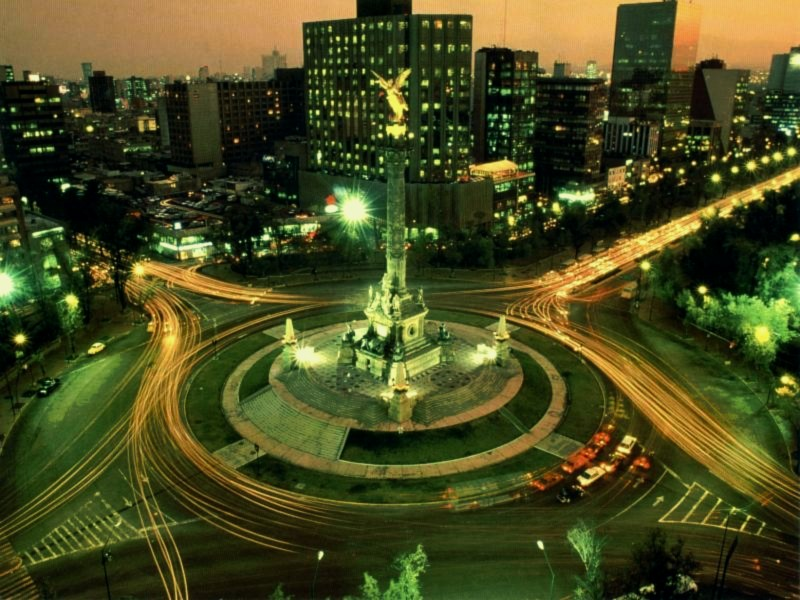
Angel of Independence

Mexico City has been an iconic example of an extensive metropolitan area since the 14th century, when it became the largest city in the American continent. Its continuous population growth and concentration of economic and political power boomed in the 1930s when the country's involvement with global markets benefited the national financial industry. Currently the fifth largest city in the world, with a population of 21 million inhabitants (17.47% of national population) living in 16 districts and 59 municipalities, the urban area continues to expand receiving 1,100 new residents daily. The division of the city is derived from a strong socially and economically segregated population connected by its interdependence, that manifests into spatial arrangements where luxury areas coexist alongside slums. Its development around a core called "El Zocalo" derives from the historic, cultural and political relevance of a central plaza, as well as its contemporary concentration of economic power, currently housing 80% of all national firms.

In recent years, there has been a large uptick in new development in Mexico City, funded by state and private investments. These urban developments have been catered to elite communities mainly because this group economically supports the country (38% of the total national income is produced by the top 10%) and because the government, predominantly led by PRI (Partido Revolucionario Institucional), has maintained a profit-oriented policy perspective. Thus, these developments have not only led to an increase of population, traffic and pollution due to inefficient urban planning, but have also pushed great amounts of low-income families to the edges of the city and have challenged the safety of the 11.5 million people that economically depend on the underground sector. This issue adds to the already critical condition of 40% of the population living in informal settlements, often without access to sewage network and clean water. The geology of the city, located in a mountain valley, further contributes to unhealthy living conditions, concentrating high levels of air pollution.

The reality currently faced by the city is that of a historic rapid urban growth that has been unable to be adequately controlled and planned for, because of a corrupted and economically driven government, as well as a complex society that is strongly segregated. The negative effects of gentrification in Mexico City have been overlooked by the authorities, regarded as an inevitable process and argued to be in some cases nonexistent. In recent years, however, an array of proposals have been developed as a way to continue the gentrification of the city in a way that integrates and respects the rights of all citizens.

== Causes ==
=== Neo-liberal policies and renovations ===
The displacement of people in Mexico City started in the 70s and 80s in the form of symbolic and exclusionary gentrification causing direct (pre-conditioned) and indirect (consequence) displacement. Neoliberal policies adopted in the 1980s, favored private investments to redevelop the city's infrastructure, in order to attract new users, residents and tourists, as well as new global capital motivating multiple drastic urban renovations. The vision was to embrace a market competitiveness that would make the city economically attractive for both local and foreign investments. The urban projects that derived from these conditions, however, significantly increased the prices of land, rents, services and taxes, intensified and transformed the uses of land and only benefited the government, developers and a minimum elite population. Lower-income populations were highly affected by the expensiveness of these areas and some were even evicted or relocated as part of a masterplan for a "cleaner" urban environment. The concept of an ideal urbanity was further emphasized by the prohibition of informal commerce in 1993. In some cases, the Popular Commerce Program achieved the relocation of street vendors into indoor commercial plazas, minimizing the impact of labor gentrification. Either way there are arguments against the informal commerce relocation or invisibility like the criminalization of poverty and the exclusion of local popular activities.

Clear examples of new urban areas run by private investments are Santa Fe, Interlomas and Polanco, all three undergoing massive transformations in the last twenty years, becoming popular areas for rich residentials, offices and commercial centers. Megaprojects like the Mitikah Progressive City in Benito Juarez have affected the culture of original communities and displaced thousands of people as the property taxes increased by 500% and cost of services tripled. Other traditional "barrios" that have been affected by the rehabilitation of once obsolete infrastructures are Colonia Condesa and Roma, which have had a great increment of population, shift of demographics, and increase of public activities that contribute to noise, traffic and violence. Many of these developments are also linked to levels of corruption where illegal occupation and selling of land occurs, as well as the exploitation of public land by the government without declaring taxes.

The most symbolic and important urban transformation of the city is the Historical Center renovation. After a group of elite communities, in the 50s and 60s, moved to the edges of the city were cheap industrial land could be transformed to luxurious residentials, the center became populated by lower-income families and filled with high levels of informal and formal commerce, causing the rapid deterioration of the zone in terms of public infrastructure and safety. The 1985 earthquake destroyed thousands of structures, causing the displacement of multiple families away from the center of the city, leaving the door open for redevelopment. Many of the buildings in this area were populated with banks, offices and commerce in the lower floors but severely underused on upper levels. With the neoliberal policies, the biggest Mexican entrepreneur Carlos Slim through his financial group Carso, radically transformed the morphology of the city by investing over 5 million dollars in renovating around 100 historic baroque buildings, as well as constructing new vertical structures to be occupied as housing units, offices, plazas and museums. Other urban facilities such as biking circuits, pedestrian corridors, entertainment activities, safety programs and technological infrastructure were implemented. The value of the zone tripled in 10 years, with prices of buildings going from 100 dollars per sf to 2, 176 in six years (2000–2006). Now the center is visited by more than one million people daily, regaining its symbolical, cultural and social value as the core of a nation. Yet again, El Zocalo has become a zone only feasible to live and work for a small percentage of the population, especially with the creation of Norm 26 that allowed the elevation of prices in the center to increase competition for urban land.

=== Housing regulation ===
In the wave of new policies in the 1990s the state stopped promoting public housing and allowed private institutions to lead the housing production. The government offered credits for acquisition of property, but housing became an economic product based on demand. After the reform to the Article 27, the ejidal lands (a type of communal property that was given to rural populations as a right to work their lands) were now able to be legally processed into private property. As the urban fabric expanded, infrastructure in the periphery increased due to availability of cheap terrains and communal properties began to be sold illegally to developers. Another issue is that these peripheral infrastructures are often built in unstable landscape prone to collapses and flooding and have little or no access to basic services like water distribution and health services. In addition, the houses are often built in a self-help mode, with no structural authority that supervises the construction. Around 500 thousand affordable housing units have been built in the last ten years, but the quality, location and access of these units led to abandoned households and an urban sprawl that is illegal, unsafe and inefficient. Around 100,000 people, however, still leave to the edges of the city each year due to increases of costs, despite the daily commutes and lower qualities of life. Peri-urban spaces are administratively challenging as jurisdictions don't formally fall within a local, state or federal agency's direct responsibility and thus studying and maintaining infrastructure becomes a complex task.

=== Social culture in the U.S. since COVID 19 pandemic ===
In contrast to the American Dream, studies show that US Americans are drawn towards Mexico City because of its collectivism, and rich culture and community. Many Black-Americans share desire to migrate to find a safe haven from the racial disparities they face in the United States. Statistics show that an increase in popularity on Google searches by 50% on the topic of Black migration to Mexico City rose after George Floyd's murder by the Minneapolis Police in 2020. The political climate, as well as the global pandemic of COVID-19 made this year significant in fostering conditions for migration. In the United States, as calls for quarantine began early 2020, its longevity, though unexpected, strengthened remote schooling and work. Prior to the pandemic, 5.7% of working U.S. Americans were working from home, which was increase to 17.9% in just two years.

Because of this, though the pandemic bred an economic burden on locals, forcing around 30% to move out of their homes, for some it presented an opportunity to move somewhere cheap, and work remotely, earning in US dollars. Those who relocate in this way are called "Digital Nomads".

== Effects ==
From low-scale impacts such as loss of housing security, jobs, access to resources, daily commuting and social and physical alienation, to large-scale results such as increased violence, traffic, pollution, inefficient planning, discrimination and economic dysfunctions, gentrification impacts every person living in a city in one way or another. The effects of gentrification in Mexico City come from the transformation and expansion of urban zones, as well as the adoption of capitalist policies, an elevated consumerism and a strong class domination by domestic elites. The saturation of commerce and public spaces has led to high increases in traffic congestion, noise, necessity for street parking, occupation of sidewalks and street divisions, changes of land use, tension between residents, local government and new occupants, urban violence, regulation of informal commerce and multiple protests to stop megaprojects.

=== Changes to the urban landscape ===
After an interview to three thousand people of 10 different towns a study found that more than half did not live in the same neighborhood they originally resided at, some not even in the same district due to increase of prices. The study also revealed drastic increase of commercial plazas and new neighbors with higher incomes and younger ages. Expansion of urbanization also caused changes in employment opportunities in both the formal and informal sectors, leading to increase in secondary and tertiary economic sectors and a decrease in primary activities. This same study found that gentrification lead to temporary areas with higher income diversification. This more urbanized environment, also caused higher education levels, as families were more hesitant to withdraw children from school to increase possibilities of formal jobs in the city. The regulation of street vendors caused displacement of markets and complicated accessibility to cheaper commerce, provoking labor and service instability.

Another large consequence of gentrification in Mexico City has been the increase of peripheral and metropolitan development of illegal housing, often at risk zones such as seismic areas, flood zones and dangerous slopes. In 2002, the government regularized illegal settlements for communities with a long-time presence, as a total of 709 illegal settlements were already part of the urban environment. Legalizing these settlements was a way to minimize displacement, but also to restate freedom from responsibility by local governments to ensure safe and healthy housing for the majority of population. Common political attitudes encompassed the idea that unfavored populations and rural immigrants were not being affected by irregular settlements, as these respond better to their needs, capabilities and identity than affordable housing projects, and that the self-build activity produced closer communities and larger amounts of economic involvement.

=== Environmental harm ===
A mass production of affordable single family units with poor service infrastructure and public transport have led to low qualities of life with excessive daily commuting, causing high levels of air pollution, social segregation and housing abandonment. In addition, the houses have a minimal size and often lack of privacy. The deterioration of preservation zones due to rapid city growth and lack of proper land norms is also a recent concern, as environmental stress due to exploitation of land and water has started to affect important ecosystems like Ajusco and Xochimilco, that besides housing 1800 species of plants and animals, serve to regulate weather, filtrate rainwater and have scenic value.

=== Social segregation ===
Another effect of gentrification relates to social segregation and urban segregation taking place in Mexico City. The social segregation process especially affects indigenous communities, who are forcibly displaced due to the construction of big projects. Many times these are planned without any consultation. This increases the vulnerability in terms of health, food, and living which also goes along with the general judicial neglect of women and indigenous people. To counteract this process of segregation it is necessary to establish proper housing conditions and create integration in terms of education, work and culture. Furthermore, urban segregation is happening in Mexico City due its deterioration of public space due to urban violence, instability, and dread. Gated neighborhoods, corporate, and commercial centers privatize public space for elites, fragmenting the metropolis. [1] This development is in particular increased due to existing governmental policies and the neglect for marginalized groups. It creates processes of territorial inequality and residential segregation, as well as new forms of urbanization of the territory that reproduce a dispersed city pattern, dissociated from the consolidated urban structure.

=== Erasure of cultural identity ===
As foreigners move into neighborhoods that become inaccessible to locals due to their increased price, the neighborhood changes with them as businesses become directed towards them. Local galleries and restaurants that have been there for generations are lost, and those that remain report having to adapt their spicy food, and language.

== Existing and proposed solutions ==
=== Inclusion and mindset ===
Metropolitan areas have become social, political, economic and cultural hubs that carry weight as the soul of nations. In fact, 54% of world's population already resides in urban areas and the number is expected to increase to 75% by 2050 according to the UN. The multiplicity of services and opportunities give urban spaces social value but also presents challenges of growth and inclusion. In the case of Mexico City, the rights of the population are not being met at the expense of a rapid growth that benefits an already economically powerful group. The challenge of gentrification calls for creative solutions in the way that the city is inhabited, integrated, true to its roots and fragmented in an efficient, flexible and inclusive manner. The control of urban development and of who inhabits it is moving towards humanistic approaches that ensure a homogenous participation of communities and returns agency to groups that have been overlooked.18 Strengthening local governments with efficient resource allocation and competitiveness through quality, diversity and local adaptation techniques can be an influential start.

The empowerment of people through social movements and bottom up planning processes is vital to create a society that is equally embedded in the planning and financing of projects that define the future of the city. The close communication among localities and government should foster inclusive zones, with affordable and creative arrangements of residences, commerce and service options to ensure an urban spirit that combines the modernity of global exposure and the uniqueness of traditional exercises. The relocation of people in case of light gentrification should be equally sensible to the provision of spaces that meet the needs and desires of those communities. Some urbanists propose to implement a vision that is in sync with the cultural and social conditions that are specific to the city, taking advantage of structures of religion and spirituality as instruments to redefine the way people look and think about space, in favor of a more sustainable environment. Other social approaches that can be applied are the arts as tool to deal with urban issues, where institutions generate innovative design based solutions (design thinking philosophy), engaging a wider public through unique proposals. This kind of approach was used in the 70's to reinvent lower Manhattan as a cultural center. This kind of approach also looks at placemaking, the invention of space to achieve economic success in a way that contributes to a healthy political and social dialogue, naturalizing changes in a way that the surrounding communities develop a new sense of attachment or engagement. Sebastian Zenker argues that city branding can attract talented people creating vibrant and open minded spaces with a wide range of opportunities that speak to each region.

=== Sustainability ===
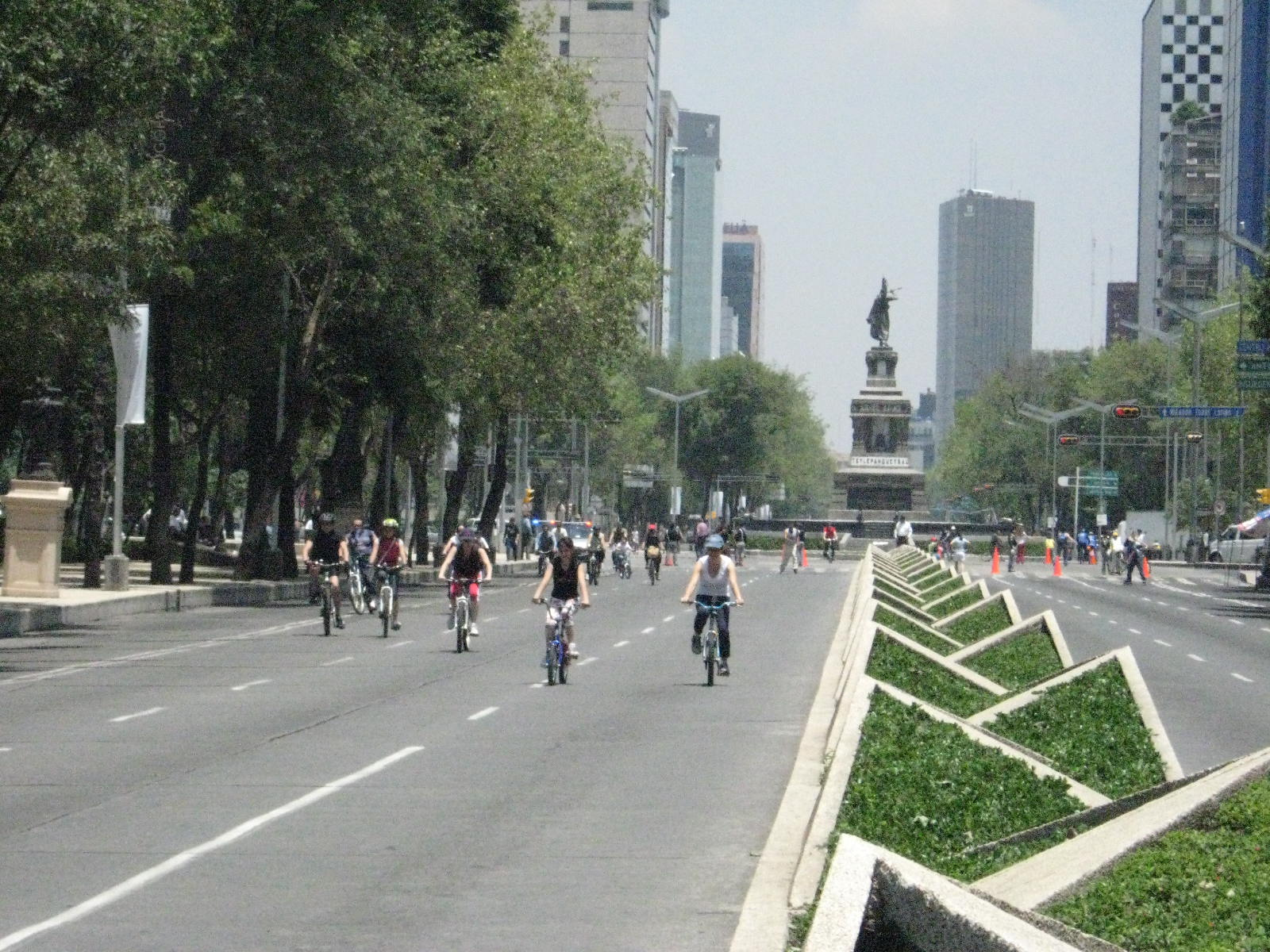
Bicycles traveling on Paseo de la Reforma in Mexico City. On Sundays this broad avenue and others are closed to vehicular traffic for the Muévete en Bici program.

In 1992 Mexico City was considered the world's most polluted city according to the UN, mainly due to transport pollutants, affecting gentrification in terms of urban quality of life. Since then, however, the city has invested in a diversity of projects including solar energy, smart constructions, better public transport and spaces and separate collection of waste linked to recycling/incinerating systems. Public transport systems in the city include light rails, subways, buses and taxis that are widely available but often in poor qualities, low reliability and excessive demand. Projects like Ecobici, a bike sharing network, (2009) have proven to be successful by becoming the largest system in North America with 85 stations and 300 km of bike lanes. In addition, zones like the historic center have various pedestrian streets, and zero emission lines of buses to replace old microbuses. Projects to build fast train tracks are also currently underway connecting outside zones like Toluca to the core of the city. Another recent program is the "Today, you don't drive program" limiting driving based on license plates.

The implementation of green spaces into urban projects like public parks, roof gardens, protected areas, vegetation in public infrastructure or even private gardens help clean the air, improve human wellbeing, reduce noise, increase the attractiveness of crammed communities and foster interaction across social groups. Compact developments with an emphasized verticality are another approach to creating active spaces with efficient energy use, less driving distances, reduced emergency response time, mixture of homes, services and jobs. Respected urbanists such as Jeff Speck argue for the walkability of cities as a solution for sustainable cities that work to stop climate change, foster community engagement, create local diversity and self-sufficiency with attainable housing, schools, parks and services that are demand induced and interconnected. Other suggestions of urbanism are to adapt to the already concentrated peripheries by decentralizing jobs and amenities, by creating new points of interest. Recent projects to incorporate sustainability can be seen in Santa Fe with the creation of La Mexicana Park, renovations to sections of the Chapultepec public park, green infrastructure in main roads such as Periferico and Reforma and the adoption of the Bando 2 policy that restricted urban growth through strict permits and housing loans by INFONAVIT (the national housing institute of workers). The definition of cultural corridors like Regina St where diverse groups coexist in a mixture of residential and commercial developments is also a good example.

=== Measuring sprawl ===
Recently, the Mexican Government created a measurement system of urban dynamics called the National Urban Systems that seeks to support decision-making process for urban and housing policies in a more productive way. Measures that can help keep track of urbanism and its consequences are the Shannon Entropy developed in 1948, that can monitor and quantify the speed and expansion of diverse regions in different time intervals. The Sustainable Livelihood approach is another great tool to prioritize and expand the scope of development increasing effectiveness and considering the capabilities, resources and activities required for different groups. Human centered design can further help the reframing of techniques to approach challenges, innovating always around people, and allocating limited resources in a way that maximizes the individual and collective experience of all groups led by multiplicity of views, needs and demands.

=== Embrace the local ===
Individual footprints and the collectiveness of social groups carry culture and symbolic materiality that can complement a dynamic urban environment. Urban projects then need to be elastic and open to constant transformations, innovative ways to create inclusive areas and represent the local features that empower social relations and spatial experience. Beautifying and modernizing the city should not come at the expense of losing its national and local "touch" to fit global conventions, but push against social demand and constrictions in a way that sustainable and efficient projects are motivated and a homogeneous society can coexist. Architectural projects and landscaping need to push for the maximization of spaces, opportunities and economic investments in a strict frame of ethics that allows all members of the population an access to dignified qualities of life with healthy environments with opportunities for cultural, artistic, educational and professional recreation. Mexico City is at a stage where its redevelopment and re-planning strategies need to be questioned and reframed to fit its real needs as the core of a multi-cultural nation. In doing so, the city could serve as a global example of the power of urban areas to shift mindsets, challenge conventions and produce environments for people to live in.

== Protests ==
Mexico City residents have demonstrated against gentrification of the city starting July 2025. On 4 July, several tourists were harassed, and local businesses in the Condesa and Roma neighborhoods were vandalized and looted. On 22 July, demonstrators vandalized the Museo Universitario Arte Contemporáneo, the Mexico City Metrobús system, and burned books in a local bookstore, while also criticizing the 2026 FIFA World Cup, which the city was set to host matches for.

== See also ==
- Gentrification
- Mexico City
- History of Mexico City
- Metropolitan areas of Mexico
- Sustainable cities
