= Bike paths in Bogotá =

Cycle network in Bogotá, Colombia

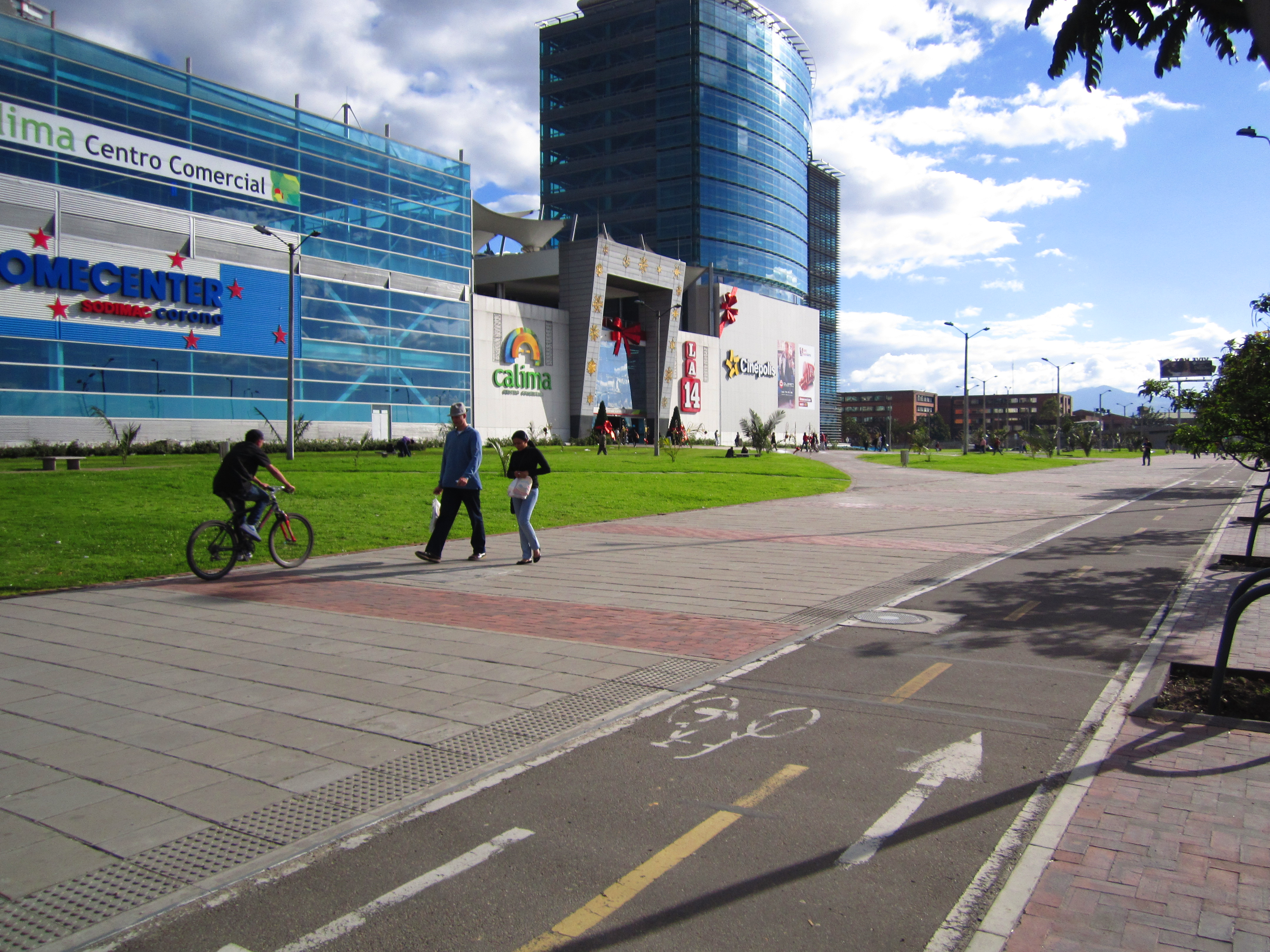
A bike path in Los Mártires

Bogotá is the city with the most extensive and comprehensive network of bike paths (Spanish: Ciclorrutas de Bogotá) in the Americas, with a total of 564 kilometers (350 mi) as of 2022. The network was initially designed and built during the administration of Superior Mayor of Bogotá Enrique Peñalosa and is one of the most extensive in the world.

The design of the network took into consideration the morphology and topography of the city. The network is integrated with the city's TransMilenio bus rapid transit system.

== Design ==
The design of the network took into consideration the morphology and topography of the city; from north to south, Bogotá has a flat topography and from east to west it has varying degrees of incline.

A mesh concept was applied for the theoretical plan of the network because it presented greater versatility and adaptation given that the road network was designed as a grid plan with streets going from south to north and from east to west. The network is also integrated with the TransMilenio bus system, which has bicycle parking facilities.

=== Network hierarchy ===
A network hierarchy was determined following the criteria above.

- Main Network: connects the main centers of the city in a direct and expeditious manner, for instance connecting the main work and education centers with the most populated residential areas, and receiving the flow from secondary networks.
- Secondary Network: leads riders to the main network, it connects housing centers and attraction centers and parks with the main network.
- Complementary Network: links and provides continuity to the network. It consists of additional bike paths that are required to complete the mesh system and to distribute bicycle traffic in specific areas. It includes a recreational network, local networks and a system of long green areas.

== Impact on city life ==
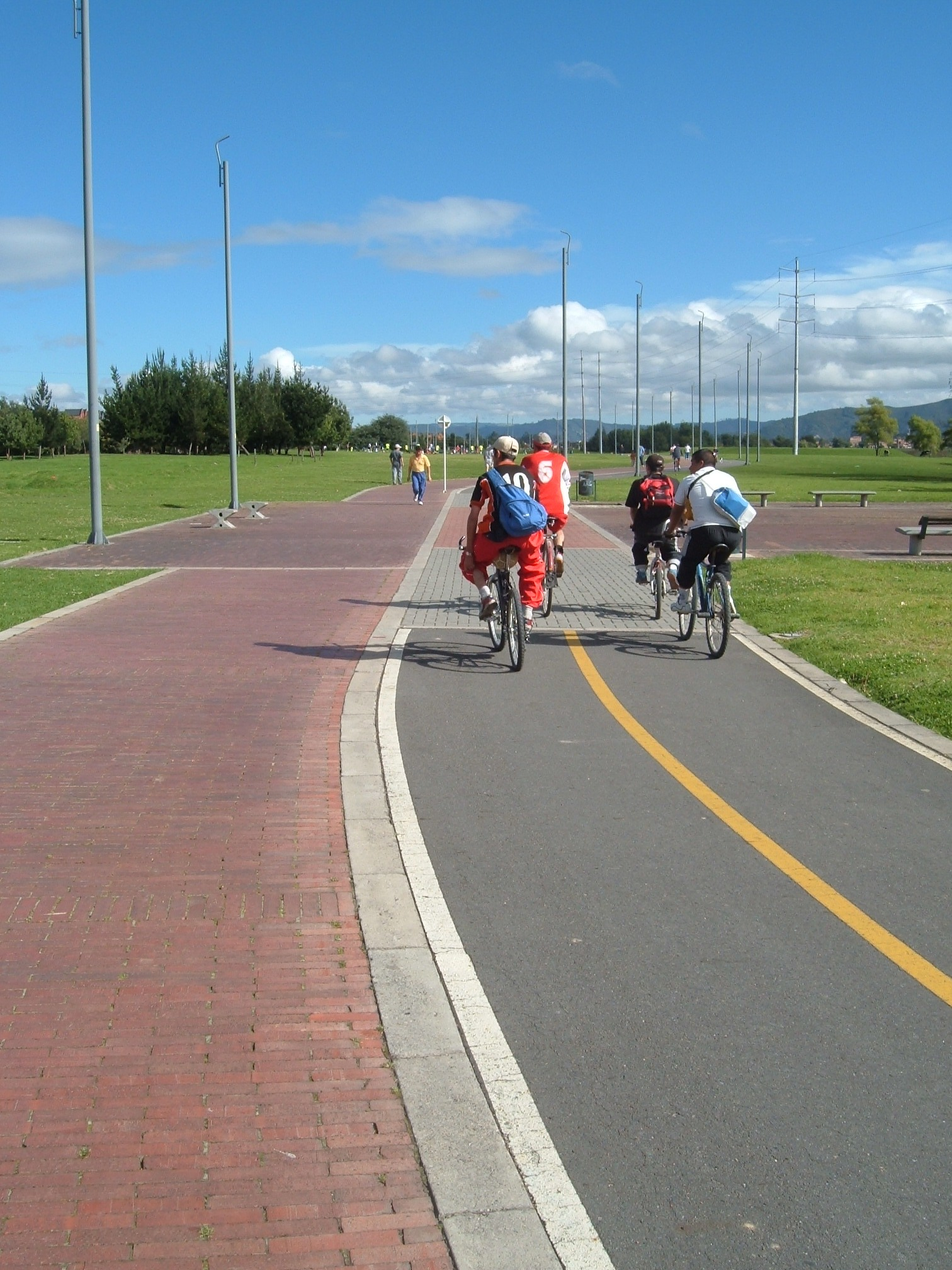
Arbour and bike path on Rio Juan Amarillo

Since the construction of the bike paths, bicycle use has quintupled in the city. There were 635,431 trips made daily in Bogotá by bicycle in 2015, corresponding to a modal share of 4.28%. A large portion of this use is in poorer southern areas.

The bike paths are an ongoing project. Many segments are still not connected to the main network. In some parts, they are placed on the sidewalk in a way that puts pedestrians and cyclists in competition.

== Routes ==
As of 2022, Bogotá had more than 564 kilometers (350 mi) of bike paths with various projects under construction and design to expand the network, such as CicloAlameda Medio Milenio, Corredor Verde de la 7ma, and TransMilenio Avenida 68. As of 2023, Bogotá had 623 kilometers (387 mi) of bike paths.

In addition to being the most extensive city network in the Americas, it is one of the most extensive in the world.

Bike routes of Bogotá as of 2016
Route	Road	Description	Length (km)	Ref.
R2	Norte-Quito-Sur	from Av. del Ferrocarril with Calle 179 - Av. Ciudad de Quito - to Transversal 30	26.5	
R3	Carrera 17	from Los Héroes - Calle 26 - Av. Los Comuneros to Calle 27 Sur	11.8	
R4	Av. Constitución	from Calle 170 along Canal Córdoba - Av. Constitución - Fucha River - to Carrera 30	24.1	
R5 Tc.	Av. Boyacá	from Calle 80 to Av. El Dorado	4.2	
R5	Av. Boyacá	from Av. El Dorado to Av. Villavicencio	20.3	
R6	Av. Las Villas	from Calle 170 - Carrera 66 - Diag. 126 - to Av. Ciudad de Cali	7.6	
R7	Carrera 19	from Carrera Séptima along Calle 161- Carrera 19 - to NQS	12.4	
R8	Av. Ciudad de Cali	from Calle 170 to Bosa	21.8	
R9	Av. Longitudinal de Occidente (ALO)	Torca Toll gate to Autopista del Sur	24.2	
R10	Carrera 50 – Transversal 47	from Calle 63 - Carrera 50 - Av. Américas - Transv. 47 - Transv. 44 to Bogotá River	11.1	
R12	Av. 13 Sur	from Av. 13 sur - Calle 54ª sur - Parque Barranquillita	11.2	
R13	Av. Villavicencio	from Av. Ciudad de Cali to Av. Caracas	10.2	
R14	Av. San José	from Carrera Séptima to Av. Longitudinal de Occidente	10.1	
R15	Calle 134 – Calle 138	from Carrera Séptima to Autopista Norte and Autopista Norte to Av. Las Villas	5.5	
R17 Tc.	Calle 80	from Bogotá River to connect R17	1.8	
R17	Calle 80	from Los Héroes to Bogotá River	10.3	
R18 Tc.	Calle 63	from Carrera 13 to Av. Ciudad de Quito	1.9	
R18	Calle 63	from Av. Ciudad de Quito to Engativá	12.4	
R19 Tc.	Calle 26	from Carrera 5ª Universidad de los Andes to Av. Ciudad de Quito	3.8	
R19	Avenida El Dorado	from Av. Ciudad de Quito to A.L.O	8.7	
R20	Canal Arzobispo – Diagonal 53	from Carrera Séptima - Av. Ciudad de Quito - Canal del Arzobispo - Diag. 53 to Simón Bolívar Park	5.2	
R22 Tc.	Avenida Jiménez	from Carrera 5ª to Av. Ciudad de Quito	2.9	
R22	Calle 13 (Av. Centenario)	from Av. Ciudad de Quito to Bogotá River	12.0	
R23 Tc	Calle 34	from Carrera Séptima to Av. Ciudad de Quito	1.9	
R23	Avenida de las Américas	from Av. Ciudad de Quito to Bogotá River	17.7	
R24	Av. Los Comuneros	from San Victorino - to Av. de las Américas	5.4	
R25	Av. del Ferrocarril	from Av. Ciudad de Lima to Av. Ciudad de Villavicencio	9.4	
R28	Av. La Hortúa	from Carrera Séptima to Carrera 30	3.5	
R29	Calle 27 Sur	from Carrera Séptima to Carrera 30	3.0	
Total			300.9	

== See also ==
- Cycling infrastructure
- Ciclovía
