= CicLAvia =

Open streets festival in Los Angeles, California

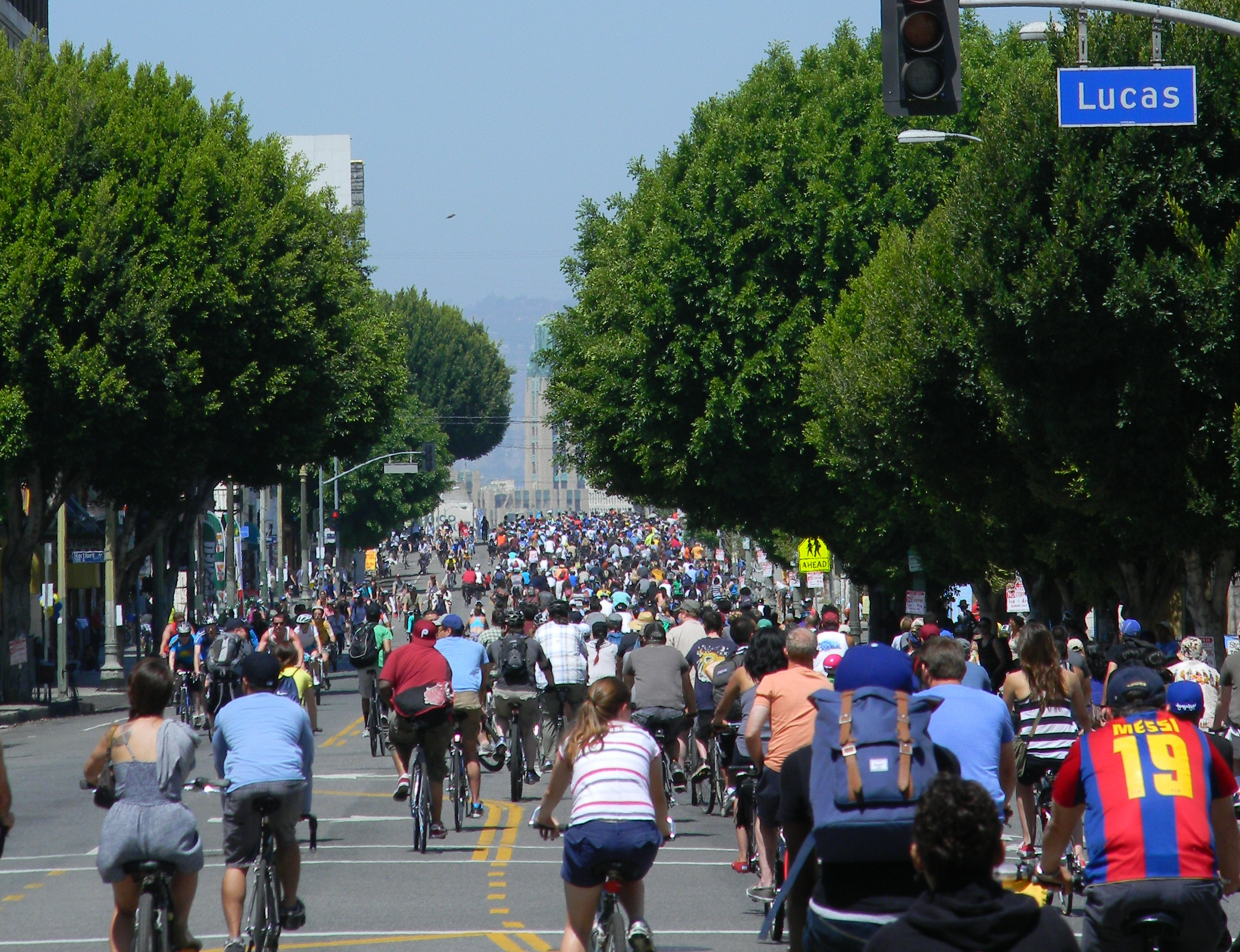
- CicLAvia—Iconic Wilshire, 23 June 2013
- Status: Active
- Genre: Open streets
- Frequency: Bimonthly
- Location: Los Angeles County
- Country: United States
- Years active: 16
- Inaugurated: October 10, 2010
- Most recent: August 18, 2024
- Website: www.ciclavia.org

CicLAvia (/ˌsiːkləˈviːə/) is a nonprofit, car-free streets initiative in Los Angeles, California. The organization temporarily closes streets to motor vehicles to make them accessible to vendors and the public. It occurs several times a year on new and repeating routes.

The event is completely free to the public. “Based on the Ciclovía model from Bogotá, Colombia, it’s when organizers, city and county officials close a stretch of city streets to all motorized vehicles and open up the roadway for people to bike, skate, run, stroll, ride a scooter and just enjoy the neighborhood, close up. Nothing electric is allowed except for the following: E-bikes with pedal-assist—but other e-bikes must have the throttle powered off—and motorized wheelchairs.”

Upwards of 100,000 people attend individual CicLAvia events, and it’s estimated that, cumulatively, more than 1.6 million people have attended them since 2010.

== History ==
=== The First CicLAvia ===
The first CicLAvia event, on October 10, 2010 opened a stretch of streets from East Hollywood through downtown Los Angeles into Boyle Heights. Over 100,000 people turned out, exceeding organizers’ expectations. The event itself was inspired by Ciclovia, a similar, annual open streets event taking place in Bogota, Colombia since 1974.

=== 10-year anniversary ===
CicLAvia celebrated 10 years of Los Angeles events on October 10, 2021.

=== Route history ===
Over 50 subsequent CicLAvia events have taken place in communities across Los Angeles County, usually covering a 5-10 mile stretch of city streets. Some of the most commonly used locations used are Downtown Los Angeles, Koreatown, South Los Angeles, Culver City, Thai Town, Hollywood, West Hollywood, and Wilmington, while previous locations also include Pasadena, Glendale, and the Southeast Cities. The longest event to date was the April 2013 CicLAvia—To the Sea, which ran 15 miles from Downtown Los Angeles to Venice Beach.

The popularity of CicLAvia has also led to other open streets events in Los Angeles County. A San Gabriel Valley-focused event called 626 Golden Streets (renamed to Active Streets in 2024) launched in 2017 and has held nine events since it began. The City of Long Beach has held an open streets event called Beach Streets since 2015, with the most recent event taking place in 2025. And from 2016-2019, the City of Santa Monica held an annual open streets event called COAST.

== Event ==
=== Details ===
Local businesses often get involved with the event, offering deals and specials along the route to take advantage of the increase in activity. At “hubs” throughout each route, there are typically food trucks, climbing walls, arts and crafts, and other games.

=== Partners ===
Los Angeles Metro provides funding to CicLAvia to support event planning, coordination, promotion, and other costs as part of a larger funding package for car-free streets. Other organizations work with CicLAvia for specific events, like the LA Phil and UCLA.

== Impact ==
The goal of the nonprofit is to encourage public health, mass transit and vibrant use of public space through car-free street events. In addition to fostering bicycling and walking, LA Metro staff report that CicLAvia events coincide with a 10% or greater increase in rail ridership and system-wide increases in sales of day passes. RAND Corporation researchers evaluated the physical activity at a CicLAvia event, reporting that 45% of participants would have otherwise been sedentary, and recommending CicLAvia increase event frequency.

A UCLA study found a reduction in local crime by 40%, as well as additional benefits for local businesses along the route, which see sales increase anywhere from 10% to 57% on event days. A separate study measured the air quality impacts of a CicLAvia event in downtown Los Angeles, finding a substantial decrease in particulate matter and ultrafine particles along and near the route.

The event has also renewed calls to turn the intersection and portion of Hollywood Boulevard in front of the Hollywood & Highland Center into a public plaza, similar to Times Square.

== See also ==
- Ciclovia in the United States
- Critical Mass
- List of Los Angeles bike paths
