= Ciclopaseo in Quito, Ecuador =

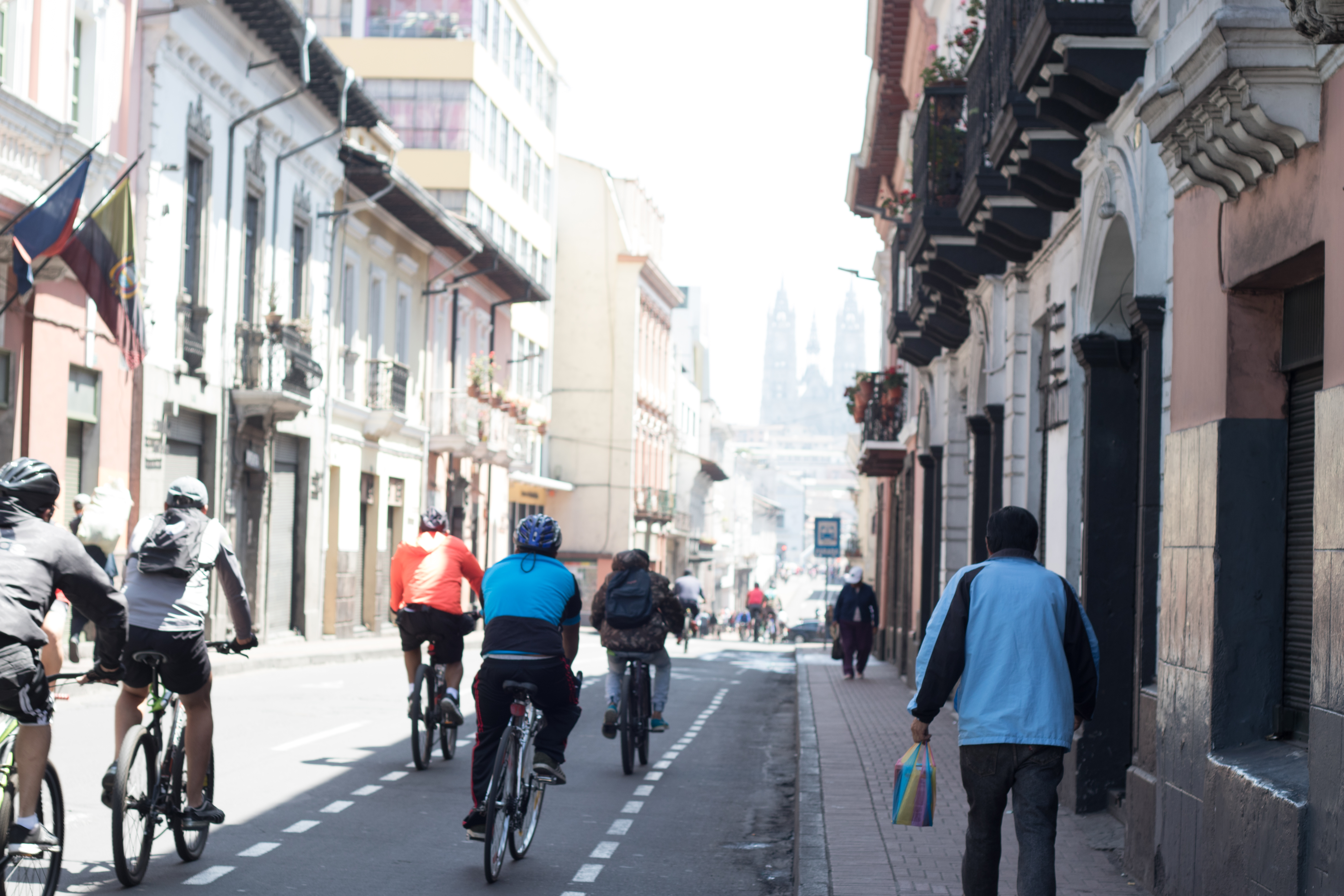
Ciclopaseo through Quito

The Ciclopaseo is a project created by Biciaccion Foundation. It was administered by this organization from 2003 until 2007, from there it was organized by the local organization Ciclopolis until 2017. Nowadays the local traffic law enforcement organisation (Agencia Metropolitana de Tránsito by the Spanish name) is administering the project. A route of 30 km running from the North to South of the city is closed to traffic every Sunday from 8 am until 2 pm to give preference to cyclists and pedestrians. The project is run in cooperation with the Municipality and features diverse locations of the city from Carolina Park, Ejido Park the Historic Center of Quito, Avenue Rio Amazonas, and The Panecillo.

== History ==
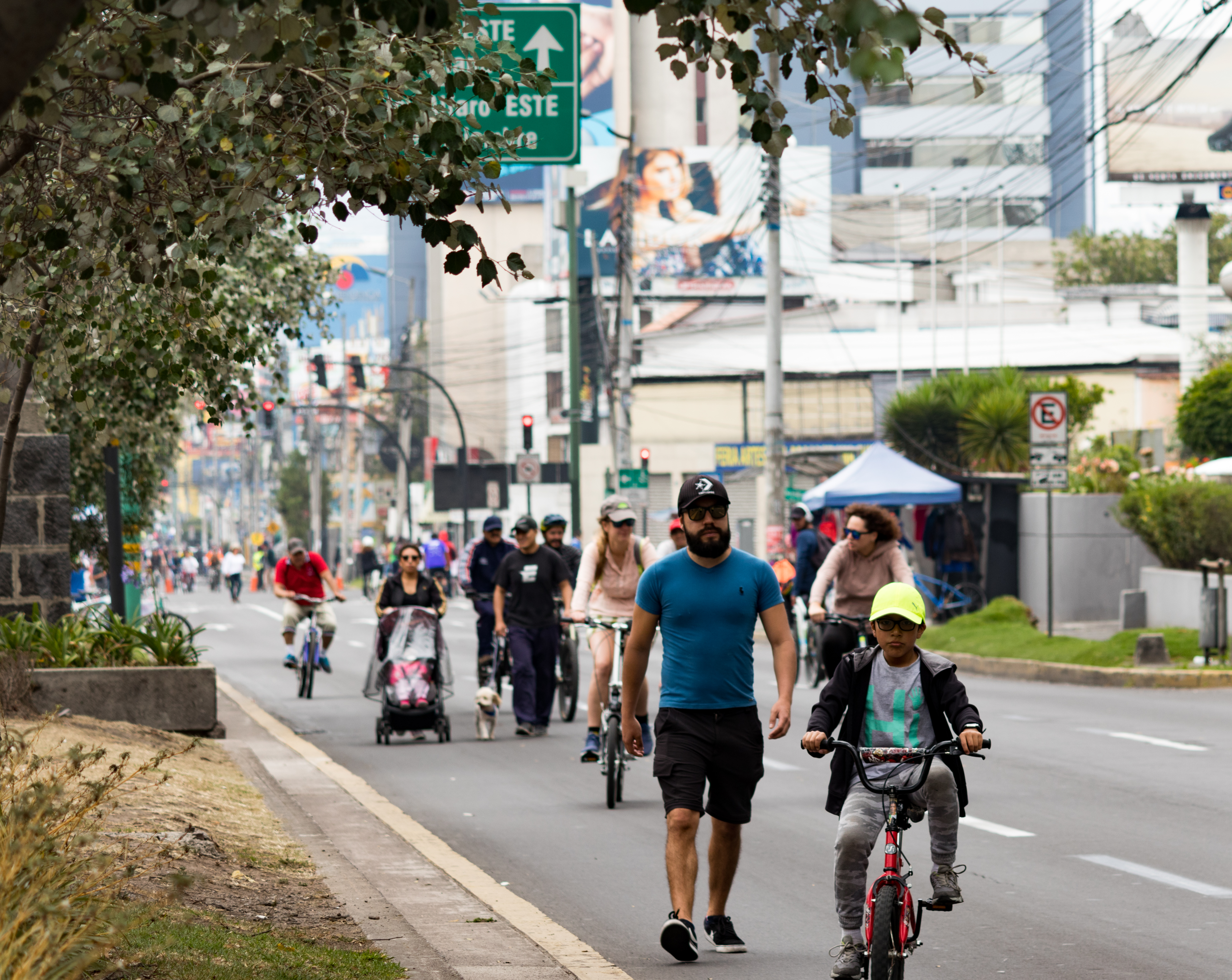
Ciclopaseo along Amazonas

The first Ciclopaseo in Quito took place in April 2003 when the path was only 9.5 km and 3,000 people participated. At that point, Ciclopaseos were only held on the last Sunday of every month but the event grew in popularity. In six months the route had grown to 20 km with 25,000 participants.

The mayor of Bogotá, Antanas Mockus, rode alongside Quito's mayor, Paco Moncayo, in the second monthly Ciclopaseo of May, 2003. The Ciclopaseo of June was the first themed event that emphasized children, followed by the event "Quito is for Everyone" in June, which featured the winners of the Special Olympics. In October, the Rotary Club of Quito recognized the project with the award "Premio Rotary Quito Metropolitano."

== Ciclopaseo, founded by Biciaccion Foundation ==
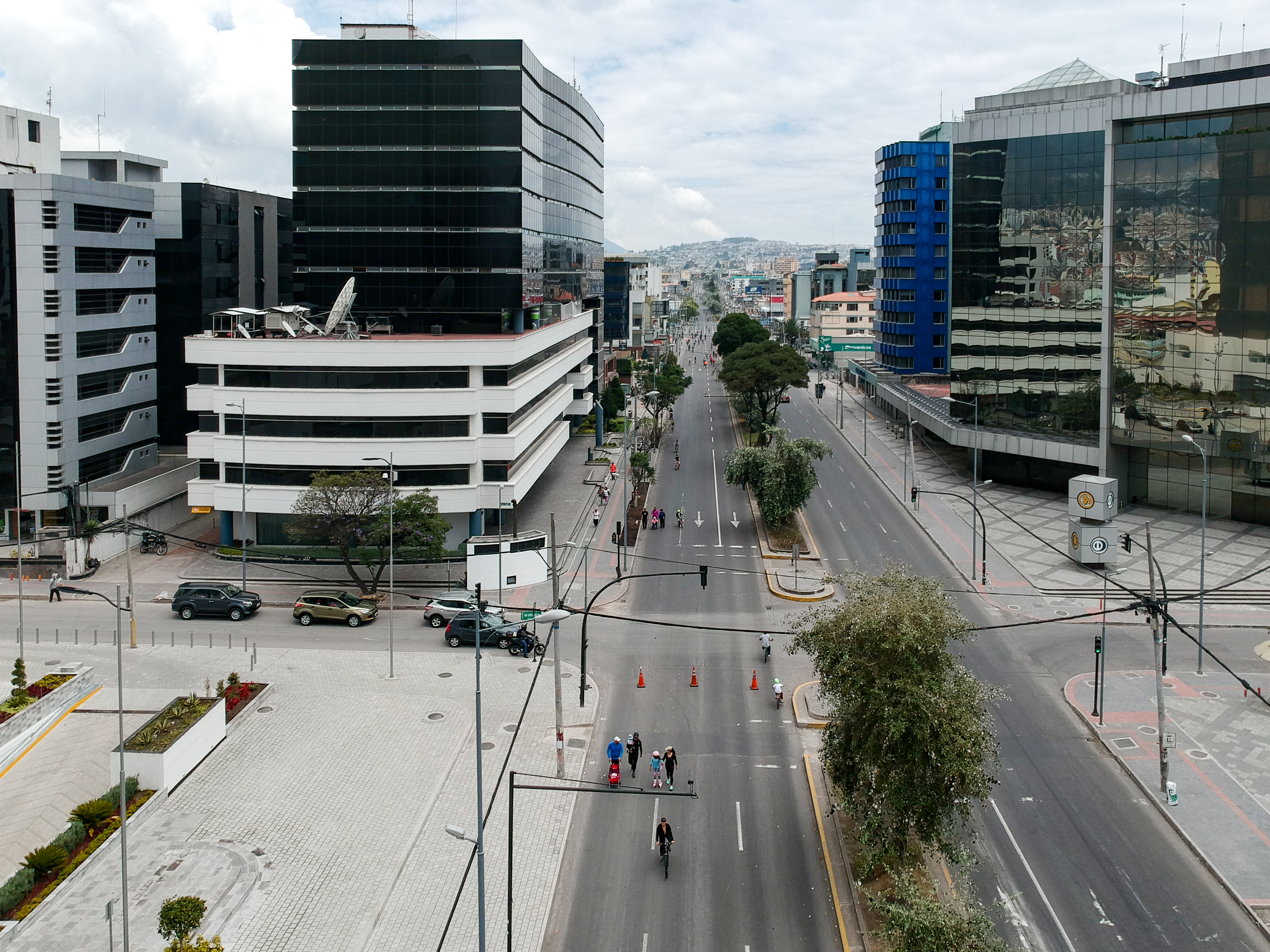
Ciclopaseo along Amazonas

The organization that promoted the Ciclopaseo was Bicciaccion under the direction of Diego Puente, Alexa Velasco, Cristian Cerda and others. There were another collaborators included the Metropolitan District of Quito, The Metropolitan Transportation and Services Administration of Quito (Empresa Metropolitana de Servicios y Administración de Transporte in Spanish), Ecological Action ( Accion Ecologica in Spanish) and the Roadrunner Club (Club Correcaminos in Spanish). and 635 police officers. When Diego Puente founded Ciclopolis in 2008 the project moved with him.

The Ciclopaseo began 2005 by doubling its frequency to every fifteen days and in May 2009 became a weekly event and takes place every Sunday. In 2016, local media had reported a perceived conflict of interest with Ciclopolis' executives and a City official (Diego Puente) working at the time for the Secretariat of Mobility, following a polemic increase in the operation cost of Ciclopaseo. In 2017, the operation of Ciclopaseo was handed to the local municipal traffic enforcement agency (AMT), who also began to administer the City's bike share program.

== Ciclovía ==
Ciclovía, ciclovia or cyclovia (/ˌsiːkloʊˈviːə/; Spanish: [sikloˈβi.a]) is term which translates from Spanish into English as "bike path" and now used worldwide to refer either to a permanently designated bicycle route or a temporary event, the closing of the street to automobiles for use by others.
