= Ciclovía =

Open-streets events in Colombia and beyond

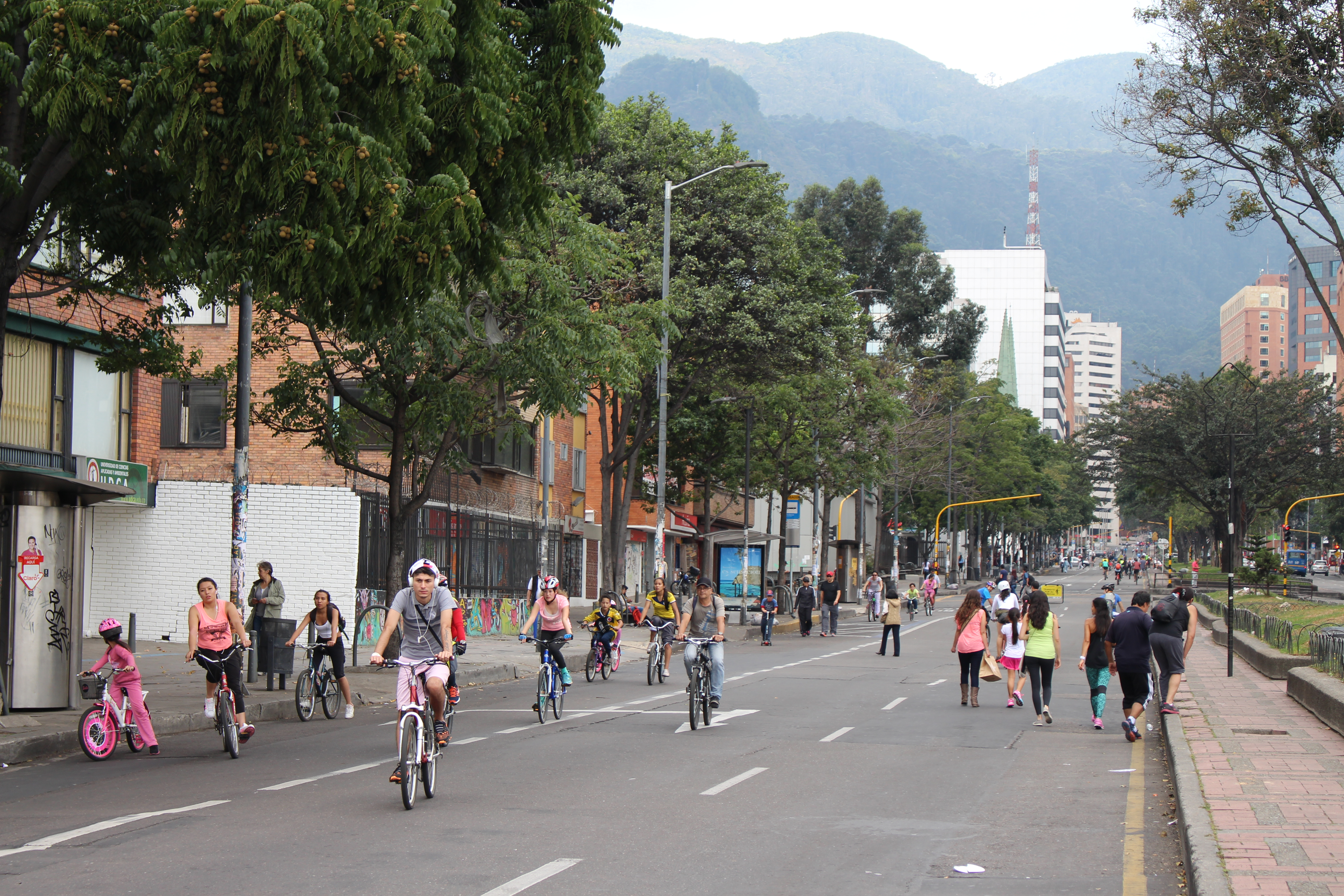
Bogota's Ciclovia at Avenida Chile

Ciclovía (/ˌsiːkloʊˈviːə/, Spanish: [θikloˈβi.a]), also ciclovia or cyclovia, is a Spanish term that means "cycleway", either a permanent bike path or the temporary closing of certain streets to automobiles for cyclists and pedestrians, a practice sometimes called open streets.

== Origins in Colombia ==
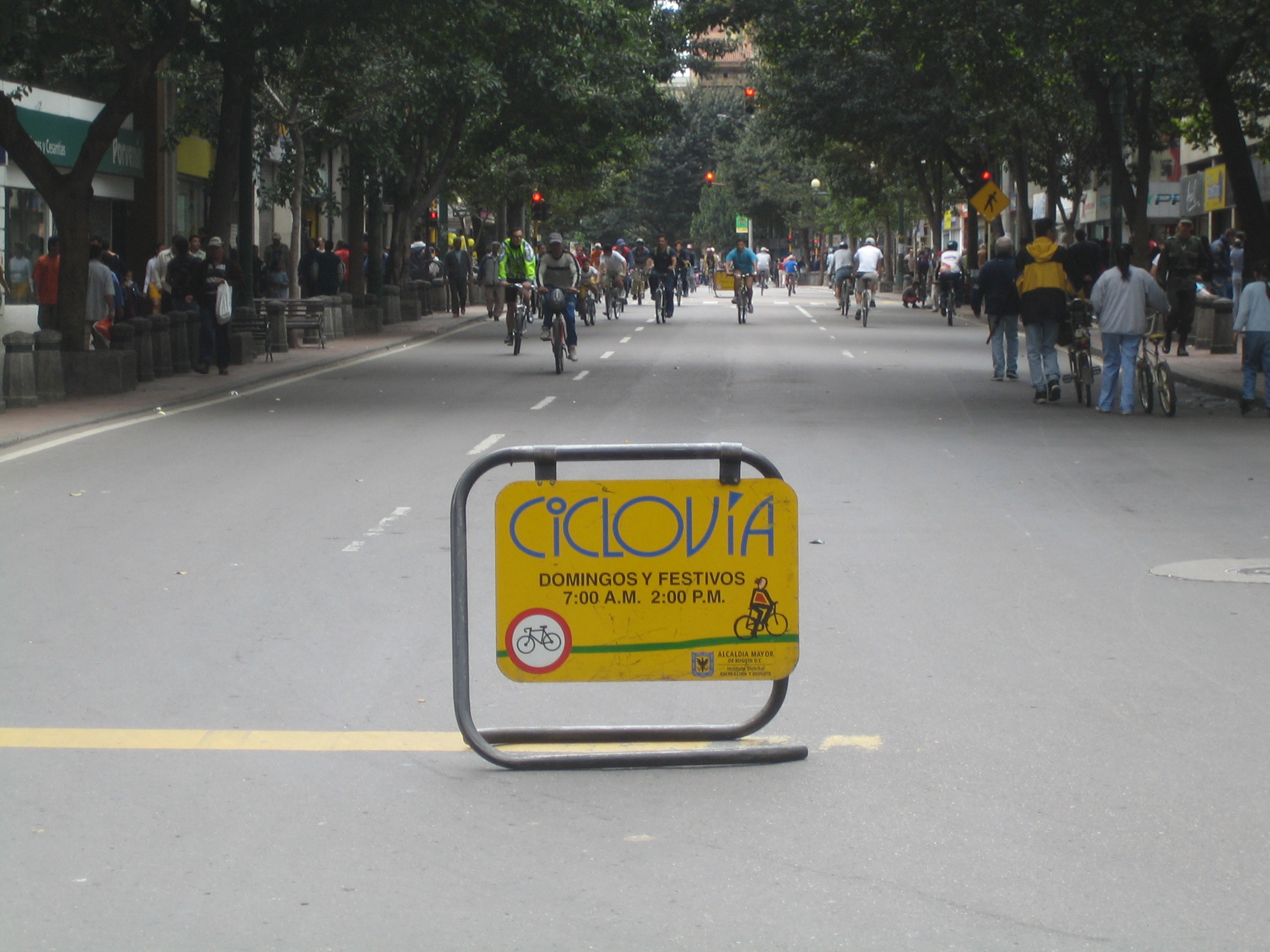
Ciclovía in Bogotá

The inspiration for Ciclovías is credited to Bogotá, Colombia. In 1970 the National Capital Commission in Canada's capital Ottawa organized open streets for active transportation. The events have taken place since December 1974 when they started through the efforts of organizer Jaime Ortiz Mariño and others cyclist aficionados. In 1976 Bogota's Mayor Luis Prieto Ocampo signed the 566 and 567 decrees and Ciclovía became an official program promoted by the City government and supported by the Transportation Department. In Bogotá, permanently designated bikeways are also known as ciclorrutas, while streets temporarily closed for that purpose are called ciclovías.

Each Sunday and public holiday from 7 am until 2 pm certain main streets of Bogotá, Cali, Medellín, and other cities are temporarily blocked off to cars allowing runners, skaters, and bicyclists to workout in a more comfortable environment. At the same time, stages are set up in city parks. Aerobics instructors, yoga teachers and musicians lead people through various performances. The great variety of traditional food and drinks offered in snack stalls motivates many locals and tourists to go around the Ciclovía. Bogotá's weekly ciclovías are used by approximately 2 million people (about 20% of the population) on over 120 km of car-free streets.

In 2007, a Colombian Congressman, José Fernando Castro Caycedo, proposed a law banning Ciclovia, charging that it caused traffic jams. Ciclovia users protested the change, and received support from ex-mayors Peñalosa and Samuel Moreno, as well as several members of the city council and other Members of Congress. The proposal was defeated.

=== Schedule ===
The Bogota Ciclovía provides service from 7:00 am to 2:00 pm Sundays and holidays by the main roads of the city, connected in a circuit of over 121 kilometers long and covers all sectors of the city.

Since 1995 its management was taken over by the Instituto Distrital de Recreación y Deporte. Since then and gradually, it has been constructed to reach its present appearance and acceptance among its thousands of users. Its infrastructure allows nearly one million users leave their homes to safely practice different types of physical activities.

The Ciclovía was awarded under the II International Competition 2005 Active Cities Healthy Cities, through its contribution to the development of an alternative and efficient physical activity in the city.

Ciclovia routes 2016

== Ciclovía in other countries ==
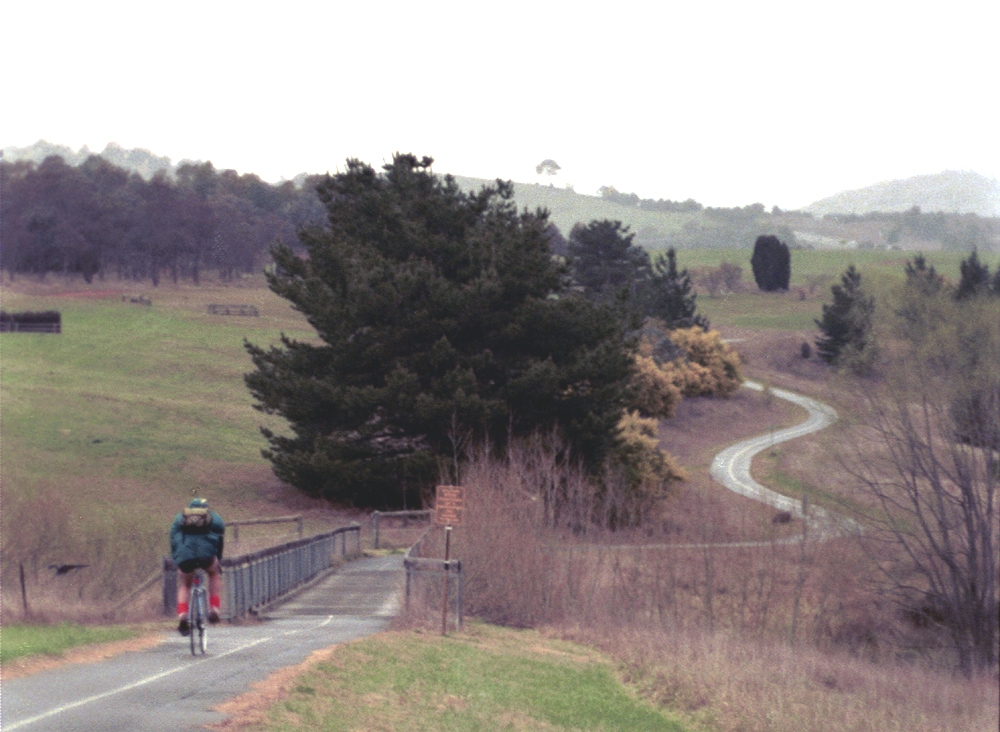
Bikepath to Weston Creek in the Suburbs of Canberra, part of the Australian Capital Territory

=== Australia ===
On the Gold Coast, Queensland, the City of Gold Coast held the city's first Ciclovia dubbed "Bike and Street Fest" on 4 May 2014. A section of Varsity Parade, Varsity Lakes was car-free for a four-hour celebration of bikes and all forms of active travel. The event included food stalls, street performers, live music and a BMX stunt show and attracted approximately 5000 visitors. Bike and Street Fest was held for a second consecutive year on Varsity Parade, Varsity Lakes on 3 May 2015. The event again included street performers, live music and a BMX stunt show and ran in conjunction with the "Ride. Run. Walk." event which hosted a number of fun runs and competitive bike rides. The event attracted an estimated 7,500 visitors.

In Melbourne, the Merri-bek city council has held two Cyclovia events, on 28 May 2006 and 13 April 2008. A 4-kilometre (2.5 mi) section of the busy arterial Sydney Road was car-free for six hours. Bicycles and pedestrians filled the road, and trams also flowed as normal. A smaller (1.5 km long) section of same road is closed off to trams as well as motorised vehicles for the Sydney Road Street Party in the late southern summer each year.

=== Argentina ===
Rosario was the first city in Argentina to hold an official Ciclovia, called Calle Recreativa. Each Sunday and holiday few important avenues of Rosario, are blocked off for the event to become carfree. From 8 am to 1 pm, runners, skaters and bicyclists take over the streets. Rosario's weekly ciclovías are used by approximately 30.000 people on over 13 km of carfree streets. Buenos Aires started its Ciclovías network in 2009, and as of 2013 it covers more than 100 km and continues expanding.

=== Belgium ===
Brussels hosted its first Cyclovia on August 21, 2011. About 10 km of roads were totally or partially closed, with a course spanning from the Cinquantenaire Park throughout the centre of the city ending at the western boundary of the Small ring (Brussels). Another event is planned for September 11, 2011. The second Belgian Cyclovia will take place on the June 17, 2012.

=== Brazil ===
Walkable city streets are commonly closed on Sunday in major cities, one notable example being Avenida Atlântica in Copacabana, Rio de Janeiro. São Paulo opens 118 km of car lanes to bikes-only every Sunday and holiday from 7 am to 4 pm, one of the most extensive programs in the world. The capital city of Brasilia also has a Sunday program with 16 km of lanes opened, complementing an extensive network of protected permanent bike lanes. Numerous other Brazilian cities have smaller programs.

=== Canada ===
Halifax held an event called Switch Open Streets on September 9, 2012, and planned to hold three more in 2013, beginning June 9, 2013. The first Switch attracted approximately 35,000 people and the event aims to create community ownership so that it may take place on more Sundays every year. In March 2012, Gil Penalosa visited Halifax.

Winnipeg was the first city in Canada to hold an official Ciclovia, on Sunday, September 13, 2009. The event saw thousands of people crowd Broadway on bikes, skateboards and on foot. The event was such a success that organizers, the Downtown Winnipeg BIZ, hope to make it an annual event.

Vancouver held its first Ciclovias, called Vancouver LiveStreets, on June 26, 2011, and September 11, 2011. The events are a partnership between The City of Vancouver and the Vancouver Area Cycling Coalition (VACC).

Calgary, Alberta has hosted the Bow River Flow since 2009. Most recently, on August 21, 2011, it saw the opening of two lanes of the Memorial Drive Parkway for thousands of Calgarians to enjoy dozens of participatory activities in a non-consumeristic street festival Bow River Flow. Organizers have proposed larger scale multi-day events for 2012.

Hamilton is holding its seventh Open Streets event, based on the Ciclovia movement on June 23, 2013. The event is organized by a group of community partners and invites people to walk ride or roll down town through over 2K of James St. N car free.

Ottawa - Gatineau has been the site of Ciclovías-type street closures (for motorised vehicles) since 1970, organised by the National Capital Commission. Every Sunday morning from Victoria Day until Labour day over 50 kilometres of roads in the heart of Ottawa and nearby Gatineau Park are reserved for cyclists, in-line skaters, runners, and pedestrians. This initiative is called the Sunday Bikedays Program. In 2021 the NCC converted Sunday Bike Days to Weekend Bike Days and added weekday closures on Queen Elizabeth Drive and Colonel By Drive to create more space for active transportation.

Toronto Is relatively new to this initiative and started in 2014 with annual event of weekend closures for the two main streets: Yonge and Bloor. Closed part of streets reached 10 km in 2016 and had over 80 000 participants. Event is accompanied by multiple "activity hubs" - nodes of active programming spaced along the Open Streets TO route. This annual event is named the Open Streets TO.

=== Chile ===
Every Sunday morning 32 kilometres of roads in Santiago de Chile are reserved for cyclist, runners, skaters, etc. This is called CicloRecreoVía. The program started in 2006 and meets every Sunday to 34,000 people 09:00 to 14:00.

In northern Chile CicloRecreoVía is implemented each Sunday in the city of Antofagasta on the waterfront along 4 km car-free.

=== Costa Rica ===
A 5.8 km long ciclovía was built in the city of Cartago in 2012.

=== Ecuador ===
The first Ciclopaseo in Quito took place in April 2003 when the path was only 9.5 km and 3,000 people participated. At that point, Ciclopaseos were only held on the last Sunday of every month but the event grew in popularity. In six months the route had grown to 20 km with 25,000 participants.

The Ciclopaseo is a project organized by the local organization Ciclopolis to promote urban cycling, sustainable transportation, and community building in Quito. A route of 30 km running from the North to South of the city is closed to traffic every Sunday from 8 am until 2 pm to give preference to bicyclers and pedestrians.

The project was partially inspired by the Ciclopaseo in the neighboring capital of Bogota, Colombia. The mayor of Bogota, Antanas Mockus, rode alongside Quito's mayor, Paco Moncayo, in the second monthly Ciclopaseo of May, 2003. The Ciclopaseo of June was the first themed event that emphasized children, followed by the event "Quito is for Everyone" in June, which featured the winners of the Special Olympics.

The Ciclopaseo began 2005 by doubling its frequency to every fifteen days and in May 2009 became a weekly event and takes place every Sunday.

=== Guatemala ===
Guatemala City currently hosts the Pasos y Pedales event every Sunday from 10:00 to 14:00 on some of the municipality's main thoroughfares, in Zones 2, 7, 9, 10, 11, 13 and 14. Thousands of residents enjoy Pasos y Pedales each week. There have also been a series of permanent cycleways already built on major roads in Zones 10, 12 and 15, as well as several others. These are starting to appear already in other cities and towns nationwide, as well.

=== India ===
The Indian city of Bengaluru initiated the first sustainable awareness campaign called Cycle day in October 2013. The planning for this initiative began prior to September 2013. This initiative has completed 300 Cycle day events across the city of Bangalore conducted by 32 community partners in the span of 3.9 years.

Gurgaon introduced the concept in November 2013 under the name Raahgiri Day, taking place on Sunday mornings. Raahgiri has had a positive impact on local air quality, with measurements estimating that vehicular emissions were down by 49% on Sunday mornings in comparison to other days of the week. The Raahgiri concept was expanded into other cities, such as Delhi, Bhubaneswar, and Noida (under the name Happy Streets).

The chief minister of Haryana announced financial assistance for expanding Raahgiri to all districts in Haryana

=== Indonesia ===
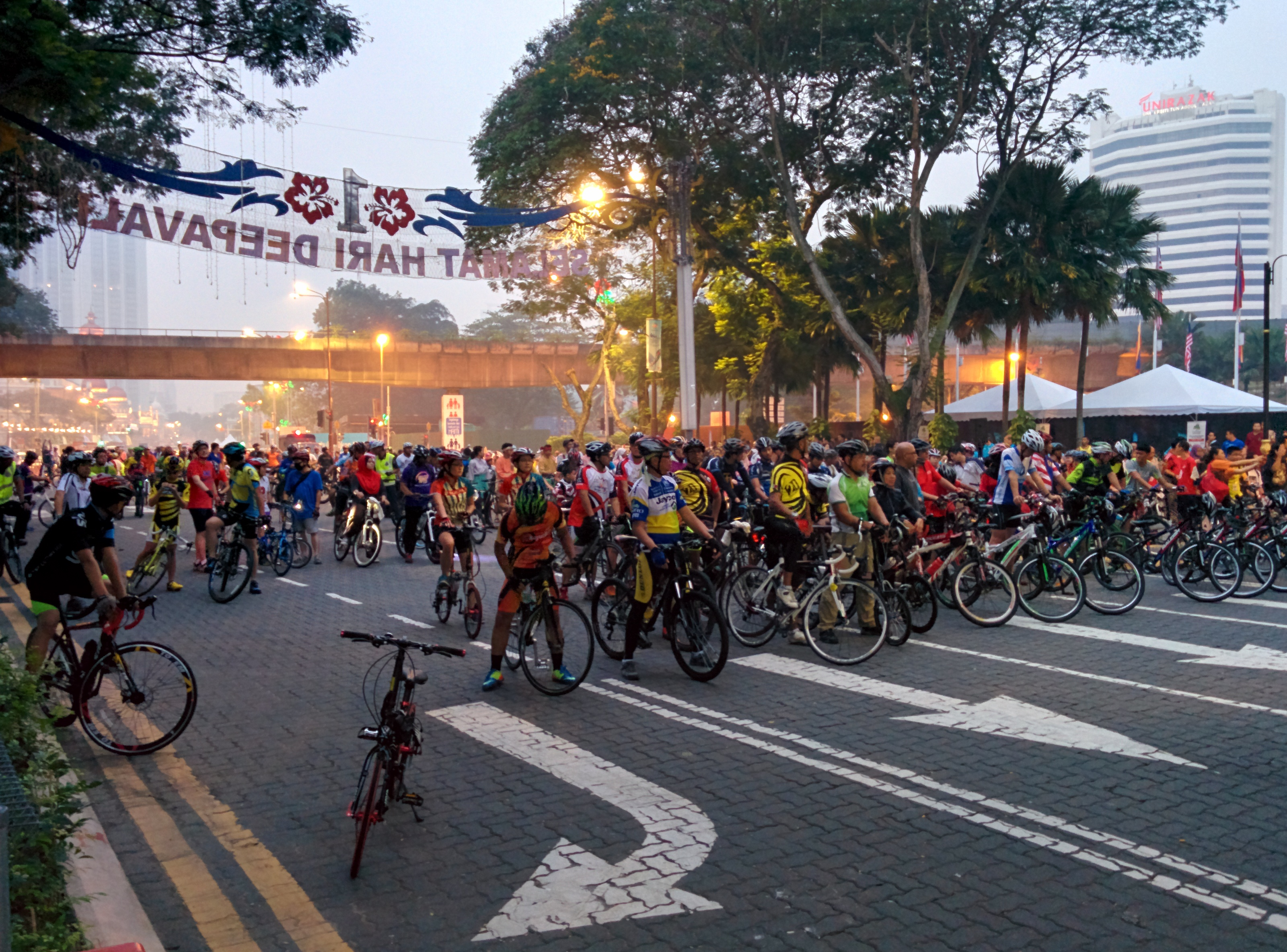
Cyclists getting ready to ride at Kuala Lumpur Car Free Day event on October 28th, 2015.

Jakarta hosts a Car-Free Day (CFD) event every Sunday on Jalan Sudirman and Jalan MH Thamrin, two of the city's main thoroughfares, from 6 am to 11 am. Pedestrians and cyclists are free to exercise in the streets and sidewalks (which are normally blocked due to illegally parked motorcycles and food stalls) with more than 100,000 people participating each Sunday. CFD was started in 2007 under the Fauzi Bowo administration and signed into regulation as a twice monthly event in 2010 and as a weekly public event in 2012. Activities taking place on CFD must conform to one of four main themes: Sports, Health, Environment, and Cultural Arts. CFD was suspended on March 15, 2020, due to the COVID-19 pandemic. It was reopened on June 21, 2020, to allow people to exercise only (street vendors were banned), but closed down again due to crowds not maintaining proper social distancing outdoors.

=== Malaysia ===
Kuala Lumpur hosts a Car-Free Morning event on the first and third Sunday of every month from 7 am to 9 am starting at Dataran DBKL. The streets of Kuala Lumpur's Golden Triangle (the city's main business and shopping district) are closed to vehicles to allow pedestrians and cyclists to utilize the space for exercising, skating, and cycling. The program was introduced on September 22, 2013, and has around 3,000 at participants each event. The event is sponsored by many companies including the title sponsor, OCBC Bank, which provides 140 free bikes for participants to use on a first-come, first-served basis.

=== Mexico ===
Mexico City has several circuits, the most important runs 59 km from Polanco to Fierro del Toro. Guadalajara has almost 60 km of ciclovia routes named "Vía RecreActiva" and growing established for use on Sundays 8:00 to 14:00. Every Sunday morning, Morelia's Centro Historico is a ciclovia route.

=== New Zealand ===
Waiheke Island, about 17.7 km (about 35 minutes by ferry) from Auckland, has had two ciclovia events, in 2009 and 2010, when groups headed by Cycle Action Waiheke temporarily closed The Esplanade, a gravel road between Blackpool and Surfdale, to motor traffic.

Christchurch held its inaugural "Open Streets" ciclovia on September 29, 2013 (postponed from July 14 due to bad weather). Approximately 3 km of streets in central Christchurch were closed to motor traffic for six hours, to celebrate the re-opening of the CBD earthquake cordon. A wide range of activities and demonstrations were held throughout the day, including bike fix-ups, public art displays, bike polo, urban orienteering, a bike parade, and numerous musicians and entertainers.

Auckland launched its inaugural ciclovia on February 8, 2014. The city's harbour edge from Britomart Place through to Silo Park in Wynyard Quarter was closed to publicise the ambition to turn Quay Street into a world-class boulevard, removing traffic from Quay Street and to encourage greater investment in cycling from Auckland Transport.

Wellington held its inaugural Ciclovia on the Miramar Peninsula on February 16, 2014. 3.5 km of road were closed to traffic and opened to people on foot, bikes, scooters, skateboards and mobility scooters. The event showcased the Miramar Peninsula section of the Great Harbour Way/Te Aranui o Pōneke - a 72 km route around the perimeter of the Wellington harbour. Wellington's first Ciclovia was coordinated by the Great Harbour Way Trust, in collaboration with Cycle Aware Wellington, Living Streets Aotearoa and a local Rotary group. The event attracted 2,400 people and created support for future events. In February and March 2015, three more ciclovia were held, attracting around 5000 people in total.

=== Peru ===
Lima now has a ciclovia. As one of the first programs undertaken by the administration of the Lima mayor Susana Villaran, the major road Avenida Arequipa is closed to motorized traffic every Sunday from 7 am to 1 pm, since February 2011.

== See also ==
- Segregated cycle facilities
- Bogota's Bike Paths Network
- Carfree Cities
- Car Free Days
- Reclaim the Streets
- Car-free movement
- Sustainable transportation
- Critical Mass
- List of carfree areas
- World Carfree Network
- Living street
