= Our Favorite Things =

Video by Negativland
- Released: November 27, 2007
- Recorded: 1995–2006
- Genre: Experimental
- Length: 172 minutes
- Label: Seeland
- Producer: Negativland

Our Favorite Things is a compilation DVD by the band Negativland, released on November 27, 2007. The original release date on October 23 was skipped due to a pressing error in the DVDs and the bonus CD, a collection of Negativland covers done by an a cappella doo-wop group. It contains 20 of the band's greatest "hits" animated by 20 different artists from all over the United States. The cover parodies the artwork of the film The Sound of Music as well as title of the film's song "My Favorite Things". The front features a "review" from the character Goofy saying, "It's goofy". The people on the cover are dolls.

== Track listing ==
1. "Learning To Communicate", made by Jenny Carden and Negativland.
2. "No Business", made by James Gladman and Negativland.
3. "Gimme The Mermaid", made by Tim Maloney and Negativland.
4. "U2" ('I Still Haven't Found What I'm Looking For' Special Edit Radio Mix), made by Negativland.
5. "Time Zones", made by Miguel Soares and Negativland.
6. "Freedom's Waiting", made by James Towning and Negativland.
7. "The Bottom Line", made by James Gladman and Negativland.
8. "Yellow Black And Rectangular", made by James Gladman, Kurt Miller and Negativland.
9. "Guns (Then)", made by Peter Neville and Negativland.
10. "Over The Hiccups", made by Tim Maloney and Negativland.
11. "The Mashin' Of The Christ (Christianity Is Stupid)", made by Negativland, i.d. and Heath Hanlin.
12. "KPIX News," the original KPIX newscast about the band cancelling a tour because of the possible connection between their music and the David Brom murder case, which the band used in the prologue of the title song of their album Helter Stupid (not credited on the DVD packaging). Also included in their 1985 film No Other Possibility.
13. "Truth In Advertising", made by James Towning and Negativland.
14. "One World Advertising", made by Negativland and Tim Maloney.
15. "Why Is This Commercial?", made by R.Room and Negativland.
16. "The Greatest Taste Around", made by Harold Boihem and Negativland.
17. "Taste In Mind", made by Negativland.
18. "Humanitarian Effort", made by Mark O'Conell and Negativland.
19. "Drink It Up", made by Negativland, Mike Cousino, Paula Aguilara, Jonathan Williams, and Jessica Green.
20. "Aluminum or Glass (The Memo)", made by Tim Maloney and Negativland.
21. "Favorite Things", made by Negativland and Aaron Kruse.

=== Bonus features ===
1. "Visit Howland Island"
2. "At Home With The Weatherman"
3. "Anomalies Of The Unconscious" a film by Jon Behrens
4. "Gimme Miranda"
5. "The Monster Of Frankenstein"
6. "Buttcrack"
