= Peter Conheim =

American artist

Peter Conheim (born 1968) is an American film and music archivist and multimedia artist/musician based in the San Francisco Bay Area. He is the co-founder of the "all-16mm-projector band", Wet Gate, which uses only "found footage" and 16mm film projectors to create a live cinema collage performance, sampling the sound from the film tracks in real time, as well as Mono Pause, a long-running "situationist rock" performing group (and its Southeast Asian music spin-off, Neung Phak).

A film collector for decades, he began digitally restoring often orphaned or neglected film works in the early 2010s through his non-profit, Cinema Preservation Alliance, most notably his rediscovery of the southeastern Ohio-made SPRING NIGHT SUMMER NIGHT (1968) , a film missing for decades, reconstructed and restored by Conheim and archivist Ross Lipman.

Conheim has also focused on the art of 1970s punk and underground music as it dovetailed with film and video, having restored seminal works by The Residents and Ralph Records, DEVO and Richard Gaikowski.

Additionally, he was a long-time member of the long-running "culture jamming" performance and recording group, Negativland, based in the San Francisco Bay Area. The group's adventures with copyright are legendary, most notably a fight with U2's music publishers in 1992. Since 1999, he has been bass-playing sideman for singer Malcolm Mooney from the Germany-based music legends, Can, in Malcolm Mooney and the Tenth Planet. Since 2015, he has played bass with The Mutants (San Francisco band), one of the first bands to emerge from the mid-1970s punk music scene in the San Francisco Bay Area.

The films he has rescued and preserved have premiered since 2016 at such venues as the Berlinale, New York Film Festival, Morelia Film Festival and at Bologna, Italy's Cinema Ritrovato. Among the titles he has restored since 2016:

- The Restored Films and Videos of DEVO 1973-1990
- SPRING NIGHT SUMMER NIGHT (1967; Dir. Joseph L. Anderson)
- NIGHT TIDE (1963; Dir. Curtis Harrington)
- OBEDIENCE (1965; Dir. Stanley Milgram)
- LUMINOUS PROCURESS (1971; Dir. Steven Arnold)
- VICTIMAS DEL PECADO/VICTIMS OF SIN (1951; Dir. Emilio Fernandez)

He has numerous audio restoration, mastering and live recording credits through his Red Channels sound studio in El Cerrito. Projects over the years have included clients and artists such as:

- DEVO
- Superior Viaduct
- Sublime Frequencies
- The Screamers
- Tuxedomoon
- The Residents
- Steve Reich
- John Saint Pelvyn
- Noh Mercy
- Crack: We Are Rock
- Ron Anderson and Ruins
- Fred Frith/Chris Cutler/Thomas Dimuzio
- Porest
- MX-80 Sound

As a film and video curator, he co-owned a single-screen cinema from 2004 to 2009 and continues to present shows in the San Francisco Bay Area and beyond, as well as engaging in or assisting various film preservation endeavours. He co-created the 2003 clip-based documentary, Value Added Cinema and directed a 2005 short video observing Canadian filmmaker Guy Maddin at work, Brand Impressions. He previously served on the Board of Directors of Canyon Cinema in San Francisco.

Conheim was interviewed by podcaster/comic Marc Maron during the final weeks of his long-running podcast, WTF With Marc Maron, covering his period in Negativland through his film and music restoration work

== Discography ==
- O-Type - Darling (1988, Audio Restoration)
- Fibulator - Unhammerlike (1994, Engineer)
- Ron Anderson - Pack Small Are Half Inch (1995, Engineer)
- Negativland - Dispepsi (1997, Authoritative Voice)
- Mono Pause - Hearing Radio Through Your Teeth (1998, Voice)
- Mono Pause - Set The Controls For The Head Of The Duck (1998)
- Mono Pause - Peeping Through The Listen Hole (1999)
- Various - 1999 (1999, Liner Notes)
- Plunderphonics - 69 Plunderphonics 96 (2001, Co-Producer)
- Crack (We Are Rock) - Silent Fantasy (2002, Recording)
- Wobbly - Playlist (2002, Graphics)
- Neung Phak (Mono Pause) - Neung Phak (Mono Pause) (2003)
- Crack We Are Rock - Animal Trap (2003, Recording)
- Various - Cambodian Cassette Archives: Khmer Folk & Pop Music Vol. 1 (2004, Audio Mastering)
- Neung Phak - Fucking USA (2005)
- Negativland - It's All In Your Head FM (V1.0) (2006, Voice & Keyboards)
- Malcolm Mooney And The Tenth Planet - Hysterica (2006, Bass)
- Moe! Staiano / Moe!kestra! - An Inescapable Siren Within Earshot Distance Therein And Other Whereabouts (2006, Photography & Percussion on 'Piece No. 7 - An Inescapable Siren Within Earshot Distance Therein And Other Whereabouts (2001-2003)')
- Various - Shadow Music Of Thailand (2008, Audio Restoration, Pre-mastering, Research Assistant)
- Neung Phak - 2 (2012, recording & performance)
- German Shepherds - Music For Sick Queers (2012, Tape Restoration)
- Nōh Mercy - Nōh Mercy (2012, Tape Restoration)
- Factrix / Cazazza - California Babylon (2012, Audio And Video Restoration)
- MX-80 Sound - Hard Attack (2013, Restoration & Remix)
- Los Siquicos Litoraleños - Sonido Chipadelico (2013, Mastered By)
- MX-80 Sound - So Funny (2015, Co-Producer)
- Porest - Modern Journal Of Popular Savagery (2016, photography and voice on 'Passport Please')
- The Chopping Channel - Independent Therapy (2016, performed & co-written by)
- Negativland - Presents Over The Edge Vol. 9: The Chopping Channel (2016)
- Angel Corpus Christi - therealangelcorpuschristi (2018, Mastering)
- Negativland - True False (2019)
- Negativland - The World Will Decide (2020)
- The Mutants (San Francisco band) - Curse of the Easily Amused (2022)

=== Guest Appearances ===
- Various - Knormalities (1998, on 'Brief Lallation')
- Alboth! / Nels Cline / Moe!kestra! - Knormalities V.2 Exclamatories! (2000, Bass & Breaths on 'Godgloeiendeteringklootzak')
- Various - Touch 00 (2000, Co-Writer on 'KZSU 14 Sept 99')
- Thomas Dimuzio - Mono::Poly (2002, Film Projector, Minidisc & Processors on 'The Blunt End Is Used')
- Moe! Staiano's Moe!kestra! - Two Forms Of Multitudes: Conducted Improvisations (2003, Electric Bass on 'Conducted Improvisation Piece No. 5 (2002)')
- Hell- International DeeJay Gigolos CD Seven (2003, Recording & Mixing on 'Animal Trap')
- Various - String Of Artifacts (2005, on 'Lowland Cyst')
- Porest - Tourrorists! (2006, Hungry Cannibal Choir on 'We Eat The People')
- Various - Post-Asiatic: Lost War Dream Music (2007, on 'Sadchatri 06')
- Chris Cutler, Fred Frith, Thomas Dimuzio - Golden State (2010, recording on 'ħ')
- Various - Live From The Devil's Triangle Volume 15 (2012, Mixing on 'Sadchatri 012')
- Porest - Flimsy Tomb (2017, Voice on 'Larry Burridge')
- Mono Pause / Metabolismus - Don’t Low Up to the Amped Buenaes (2018, sounds on Side A)
- The Residents - Freak Show (2021, Restoration on 'Ty's Freak Show')
