= Ava Mendoza =

American avant-garde guitarist, vocalist, and composer

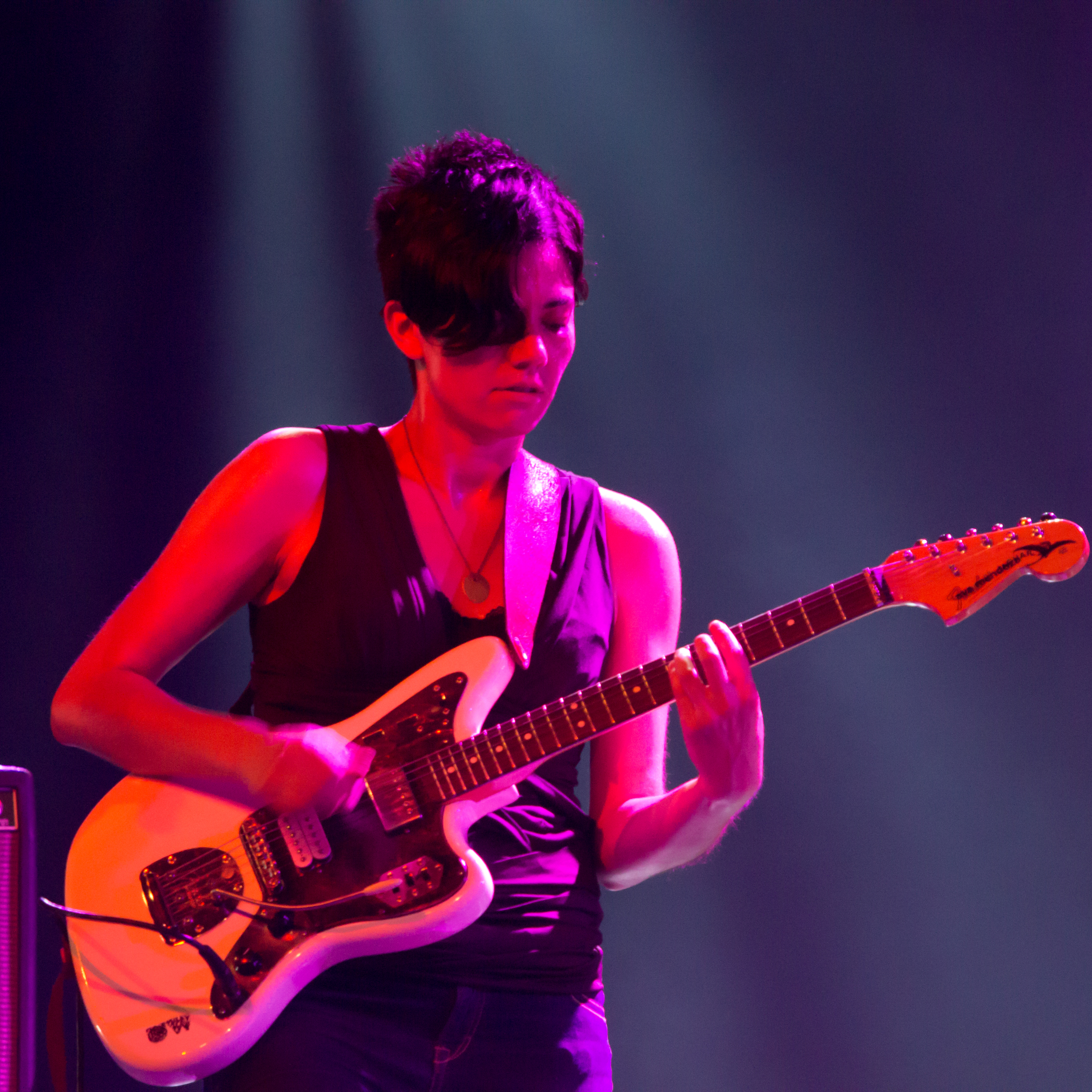

Background information
- Born: June 18, 1983 (age 43); Miami, Florida, U.S.
- Genres: Experimental rock, avant-garde jazz, improvised music, free jazz
- Occupations: composer, musician
- Instrument: guitar
- Labels: Tzadik, Resipiscent, New Atlantis, Unrock, Sleeping Giant Glossolalia
- Member of: Unnatural Ways
- Website: avamendoza.com

Ava Mendoza is an American guitarist, vocalist, and composer.

An avant-garde artist whose work is described as traversing a number of genres, Mendoza has performed with a wide range of musicians, including Nels Cline, Matana Roberts, Nick Zinner, Jon Irabagon, William Hooker, William Parker, Fred Frith, The Violent Femmes, Weasel Walter, tUnE-yArDs, Jamaaladeen Tacuma, Rova Saxophone Quartet, Moppa Elliott, Negativland, Bill Orcutt, and Malcolm Mooney. Mendoza also leads the avant-rock band Unnatural Ways, a trio with Tim Dahl and Sam Ospovat.

== Early life and career ==
Mendoza grew up in Southern California before moving to Michigan to attend high school at Interlochen Arts Academy, where she studied classical guitar; outside of school, she began improvising and playing in rock and punk bands. Mendoza later enrolled at Mills College in Oakland, California, studying with Fred Frith while attaining her BA in Intermedia Arts. After graduating in 2006, Mendoza continued performing extensively in Oakland and the wider Bay Area. Among her many projects and collaborations, Mendoza released a solo album, Shadow Stories; started her band Unnatural Ways; co-formed QUOK, a trio with Weasel Walter and Tim Dahl; and performed duo improvisations with Nels Cline.

In 2011, she was included in the Guitar World feature "10 Female Guitarists You Should Know" and contributed to the $100 Guitar Project, in which Nick Didkovsky and Chuck O’Meara performed and recorded on a guitar which they then circulated among over 65 guitarists, including Mendoza, Elliott Sharp, Mike Keneally, Fred Frith, Henry Kaiser, Keith Rowe, and Nels Cline. Each musician autographed and recorded a piece on the guitar, and the resulting works were released on Bridge Records in 2013.

In 2012, Mendoza collaborated with tUnE-yArDs to compose a live score for Buster Keaton: Four Short Films , performed at the 55th San Francisco International Film Festival.

In 2013, Mendoza moved from Oakland, California to Brooklyn, New York, where she has since performed at venues including Roulette Intermedium, as part of the Vision Festival; National Sawdust, as part of John Zorn's Commissioning Series and in a performance of his 1984 "game piece" Cobra; Rockefeller Plaza, with Nick Zinner’s 41 Strings; and The Stone, where she was given a week-long artist residency.

In 2015, Mendoza released the first of three albums as bandleader of Unnatural Ways. The band's first album, featuring Dominique Leone (synthesizer, keyboards) and Nick Tamburro (drums), was recorded prior to Mendoza's departure from California. After moving to the East Coast, Mendoza sought out local bandmates; by the time the self-titled debut was released, Unnatural Ways had solidified as a new trio with Tim Dahl (bass) and Sam Ospovat (drums). This lineup is featured on 2016's We Aliens, released on Zorn's Tzadik Records, and 2019's The Paranoia Party, which Mendoza describes as being "about aliens and being alien: political paranoia, inclusion, exclusion, migration, immigration, border crossing, alter egos and alternate realities". In 2016, Mendoza also released a split with Sir Richard Bishop and a collaborative record with Maxime Petit and Will Guthrie.

In 2017, Mendoza contributed an essay to Arcana VIII : musicians on music, a special anniversary collected edition in John Zorn's Arcana series.

She has recorded as a member of Jon Irabagon's I Don't Hear Nothin' but the Blues, the William Hooker Trio, and Moppa Elliott's Acceleration Due To Gravity. Mendoza also performs with Malcolm Mooney as a duo and in his Eleventh Planet, a project the Can vocalist began in 2019 with Mendoza, Alexis Marcelo, Steve Shelley, Daniel Moreno, and Devin Brahja Waldman.

Mendoza was included among the "rising star guitarists" of the DownBeat Critics Poll in 2015, 2017, 2018, 2019, and 2020.

== Discography ==
=== As leader/co-leader ===
Release year	Artist	Title	Label	Personnel
2010	Ava Mendoza	Shadow Stories	Resipiscent	solo
2012	Ava Mendoza with Nick Tamburro	Quit your Unnatural Ways	Weird Forest	Mendoza, Nick Tamburro
2013	Jacob Lindsay / Ava Mendoza / Damon Smith / Weasel Walter	Jus	Balance Point Acoustics	Lindsay, Mendoza, Smith, Walter
2015	Unnatural Ways	Unnatural Ways	New Atlantis	Mendoza with Dominique Leone, Nick Tamburro
2016	Unnatural Ways	We Aliens	Tzadik	Mendoza with Tim Dahl, Sam Ospovat
2016	Sir Richard Bishop & Ava Mendoza (split)	Ivory Tower	Unrock	Bishop, Mendoza
2016	Ava Mendoza / Maxime Petit / Will Guthrie	Ava Mendoza / Maxime Petit / Will Guthrie	Ranch / BeCoq	Mendoza, Petit, Guthrie
2019	Unnatural Ways	The Paranoia Party	Sleeping Giant Glossolalia	Mendoza with Tim Dahl, Sam Ospovat
2020	Mendoza / Anderson / Gauci	Studio Sessions Vol. 4	Gaucimusic	Mendoza, Vijay Anderson, Stephen Gauci
2021	fluke-mogul / Liberatore / Mattrey / Mendoza	Death in the Gilded Age	Tripticks Tapes	gabby fluke-mogul, Matteo Liberatore, Joanna Mattrey, Mendoza
2023	Mendoza Hoff Revels	Echolocation	AUM Fidelity	Ava Mendoza, James Brandon Lewis, Devin Hoff, Ches Smith
2024	Ava Mendoza	The Circular Train	Palilalia	solo
2025	fluke-mogul / Mendoza / Pérez	Mama Killa	Burning Ambulance Music	gabby fluke-mogul, Mendoza, Carolina Pérez

=== As side-person ===
Release year	Artist	Title	Label	Personnel
2012	Jon Raskin and Carla Harryman	Open Box	Tzadik	Raskin & Harryman with Liz Allbee, Aurora Josephson, Mendoza, Gino Robair, Roham Sheikhani, John Shiurba
2014	Zachary James Watkins	Mixed Raced	Land and Sea	Watkins' compositions, performed by John Shiurba, Mendoza, Jason Hoopes, Christina Stanley
2018	Chaser	Chaser	Not Unlike	Dominika Michalowska, Mendoza, Shayna Dulberger, Oran Canfield
2018	Sean Noonan's Pavees Dance	Tan Man’s Hat	RareNoise	Noonan, Malcolm Mooney, Mendoza, Alexis Marcelo, Jamaaladeen Tacuma
2018	William Hooker Trio	Remembering	Astral Spirits	Hooker, Mendoza, Damon Smith
2019	Moppa Elliott	Acceleration Due to Gravity	Hot Cup Records	Nate Wooley, Dave Taylor, Matt Nelson, Bryan Murray, Kyle Saulnier, Mendoza, George Burton, Elliott, Mike Pride
2019	Negativland	True False	Seeland	Negativland (Ian Allen, Peter Conheim, Mark Hosler, Don Joyce, Jon Leidecker, Richard Lyons, David Wills) with Nava Dunkelman, Ava Mendoza, The Not Normal Animal Chorus, Prairie Prince, M. C. Schmidt
2020	I Don't Hear Nothin' but the Blues	Anatomical Snuffbox	F Magellan Music	Jon Irabagon with Mendoza, Mick Barr, Mike Pride
2020	Negativland	The World Will Decide	Seeland	Negativland with Kyle Bruckmann, Drew Daniel, Tom Dimuzio, Jem Doulton, Nava Dunkelman, Kristin Erickson, Steve Fisk, Erich Hubner, Mendoza, Prairie Prince, M. C. Schmidt
2020	Nate Wooley	Seven Storey Mountain VI	Pyroclastic Records	Wooley with Samara Lubelski, C. Spencer Yeh, Chris Corsano, Ben Hall, Ryan Sawyer, Susan Alcorn, Julien Desprez, Mendoza, Isabelle O’Connell, Emily Manzo, Yoon Sun Choi, Mellissa Hughes, Megan Schubert
2021	William Parker	Mayan Space Station	AUM Fidelity	Parker (bass, compositions), Mendoza (electric guitar), Gerald Cleaver (drums)
2024	Bill Orcutt	Four Guitars Live	Palilalia	Orcutt (electric guitar), Wendy Eisenberg (electric guitar), Mendoza (electric guitar), Shane Parish (electric guitar)
