= Escape from Noise =

Studio album by Negativland
- Released: October 20, 1987
- Recorded: 1983–1987
- Studios: 'Our home and other people's homes'
- Genres: Experimental; electronic; sound collage; avant-rock
- Length: 42:12
- Labels: SST/Seeland (original); Seeland (1999 "un-remixed" reissue)
- Producer: Negativland

Negativland chronology
A Big 10-8 Place (1983)	Escape from Noise (1987)	Helter Stupid (1989)

Professional ratings
Review scores
Source	Rating
AllMusic	4.5/5 stars
Christgau's Consumer Guide	B+
The Encyclopedia of Popular Music	4/5 stars
The Great Alternative & Indie Discography	6/10
MusicHound Rock: The Essential Album Guide	4.5/5 stars
Rolling Stone	3.5/5 stars
Spin Alternative Record Guide	9/10

Escape from Noise is the fourth studio album by Negativland. It marked the band's first release on an established independent record label, SST Records. The album continued to develop the band's experimental style, though it also featured shorter, more melodic songs than their previous material. The track "Christianity Is Stupid", a track featuring samples of evangelist Estus Pirkle from his film If Footmen Tire You, What Will Horses Do?, proved to be an enduring signature song. Negativland gained media attention a year later after issuing a press release falsely implying that murderer David Brom had been motivated by the song; this would inspire their subsequent album Helter Stupid.

== Release ==
The original release of Escape from Noise came with a yellow bumper sticker with black letters reading "Car Bomb", and a booklet outlining the history of the band, along with photos of band members and reviews of previous releases. In the booklet, Crosley Bendix (Don Joyce) describes how the band's apartment and studio space were destroyed by a two-alarm fire on the night of "Friday the 13th of February, 1987".

The fire started in Smart Laundry, a dry cleaning business located at street level below Negativland's apartment in El Cerrito, California. When he saw flames leaping up past their kitchen window, band member Mark Hosler yelled to his friend Tera Freedman in the next room to call 9-1-1. Hosler and Freedman collected the finished master tapes and artwork for Escape from Noise and quickly left the building, just as fire crews arrived. Cleaning solvents in the laundry accelerated the fire and caused extensive damage to the building before fire crews gained control. Afterward, the band assessed the total destruction of the recording equipment and the materials from previous releases before traveling to Los Angeles to meet with SST executives and "reaffirm their album commitment".

In 1999, Seeland Records reissued the album in a new "un-remixed" edition, adding no bonus tracks and moving the text on the front cover to the booklet. A sticker was placed on the album, saying:

An old album from Negativland: Digitally exacto-remastered 33 1/3 rpm compact disc re-issue of Negativland's classic 1987 LP with no added bonus tracks of any kind!

Don't let the new cover design fool you – your audiophile friends might think that such classics as "Car Bomb" and "Christianity Is Stupid" sound crisper and cleaner on this newly un-remixed edition, but they're dead wrong! And even though there are no longer eleven time zones in the Soviet Union (and no Soviet Union, either) this re-release sounds exactly the same as the original. The only thing different is the sticker you are reading right now.

The original LP is still in print on SST Records.

In 1988, the group released a press release suggesting that the song "Christianity Is Stupid" was connected to murders by David Brom, and that the group was forced to cancel a planned tour in support of Escape from Noise. However, there were no connections with the murders, and the tour was cancelled only due to shortage of funds and free time. Their next album, Helter Stupid, made use of the event by sampling news reports on the case.

== Track listing ==
All music is composed by Negativland (Mark Hosler, Don Joyce, Chris Grigg, David Wills, and Richard Lyons).

Side One
No.	Title	Length
0.	"Announcement"	1:51
1.	"Quiet Please"	2:17
2.	"Michael Jackson"	2:08
3.	"Escape From Noise"	2:36
4.	"The Playboy Channel"	1:32
5.	"Stress In Marriage"	1:35
6.	"Nesbitt's Lime Soda Song"	3:08
7.	"Over the Hiccups"	1:28
8.	"Sycamore"	2:29
9.	"Car Bomb"	2:03
Total length:		21:07

Side Two
No.	Title	Length
10.	"Methods of Torture"	1:23
11.	"Yellow Black and Rectangular"	2:14
12.	"Backstage Pass"	1:15
13.	"Christianity Is Stupid"	3:55
14.	"Time Zones"	5:28
15.	"You Don't Even Live Here"	2:30
16.	"The Way Of It"	1:12
17.	"Endscape"	0:37
Total length:		21:16

- A hidden track follows "Endscape". It is performed on the No Other Possibility video compilation as "Fire Song".
- On the 1999 CD release, "Announcement" is split into a 0:13 Track 1 and a 1:39 pregap to Track 2.

== Personnel ==
Negativland

- Mark Hosler: singing, synthesizers, guitars, voice tapes, percussions, rhythm loops, bomb parts, David manipulation, tiny metal banjo, recorder, many other noises, mix
- Don Joyce: yelling, talking tapes, electric tympani, synthesizer, lyrics, singing, Booper bee, bomb parts and assembly, noises everywhere, mix
- Chris Grigg: drums, synthesizer, singing, computer & software, field recordings, mix
- David Wills: talking, shortwave, family tape, bomb parts, regular Booper
- Richard Lyons: singing, lyrics, voice

Additional personnel

- Ian Allen: helicopter (on "Sycamore"), rhythm loop (on "Car Bomb"), bell (on "Time Zones")
- Jello Biafra c/o Dead Kennedys: toilet flushing (on "The Playboy Channel")
- Das c/o Big City Orchestra: voice tapes (on "Quiet Please")
- Dina Emerson: wordless vocals (on "You Don't Even Live Here")
- Steve Fisk: optigan and voice tapes (on "Michael Jackson")
- Tera Freedman: voice tape (on "Backstage Pass")
- Phil Freihofner: bomb parts (on "Car Bomb")
- Ray Briem: radio talk show host (on "Time Zones")
- Ed Markmann: paid voice
- Fred Frith: urban drum and halfspeed violin (on "Michael Jackson")
- Jerry Garcia c/o Grateful Dead: mouth sounds and chimes (on "Backstage Pass")
- Alexander Hacke c/o Einstürzende Neubauten: metallic noises (on "Christianity Is Stupid")
- Mickey Hart c/o Grateful Dead: percussion and processed animals (on "Backstage Pass")
- Tom Herman c/o Tripod Jimmie: torture guitars (on "Methods of Torture")
- Henry Kaiser: doublespeed disco guitars (on "Quiet Please")
- Louisa Michaels c/o Step One Nursery School: singing (on "Over the Hiccups")
- Mark Mothersbaugh c/o Devo: jazz bass, Jimi Hendrix, e-cussion, saxophone and noises (on "The Playboy Channel")
- The Residents: hoots and clanging (on "You Don't Even Live Here")
- Rev. Ivan Stang c/o The Church of the SubGenius: larynx (on "Christianity Is Stupid")
- Rand Weatherwax c/o CBS: orchestra hits and e-cussion (on "Quiet Please")
- Rob Wortman c/o Kingshouse: leaf blower (on "You Don't Even Live Here")
