= Helter Stupid (song) =

Song by Negativland

from the album Helter Stupid
- Released: 1989
- Recorded: 1988
- Genre: Musique concrète; experimental; plunderphonics
- Length: 18:00
- Songwriter: Negativland

Helter Stupid is a song by Negativland, released on their 1989 album Helter Stupid. It is an audio collage of the media controversy that resulted when, as a prank, Negativland claimed that their song "Christianity Is Stupid" had spurred David Brom to kill his family.

In addition to audio of KPIX-TV's coverage of the Brom hoax, the piece also includes samples from Estus Pirkle, Charles Manson, and the Beatles song "Helter Skelter".

== Reception ==
Robert Christgau has described the song as "funny, slightly scary, [and] dumbfoundingly surreal", rating it A−.
