= Negativconcertland =

Live album by Negativland
- Released: 1993
- Recorded: May 5, 1993
- Genre: Sound Collage
- Length: 99:13
- Label: Atomic Novelties

Negativconcertland is a 1993 recording of a live concert by Negativland. It is a bootleg recorded from the audience. At the time of its release, Negativland had never officially released a live album. SST later put out "Negativ(e)land: Live On Tour" against their wishes to compete with Seeland's Dispepsi album. In 2006, they released an official live recording, It's All In Your Head FM, made on the tour of the same name.

== Track listing ==
=== Disc 1 ===
1. "Introduction" - 2:17)
2. "Dick Vaughn Speaks" - 5:06)
3. "The Hellbound Plane" - 7:02)
4. "Long Distance Dedication - 6:25)
5. "The Copyright Law (Part 1)" - 9:34)
6. "Time Zones" - 5:01)
7. "The U-2 Spy Plane Incident" - 7:49)
8. "U2 Part 1 (With the Weatherman)" - 7:00)

=== Disc 2 ===
1. "The Copyright Law (Part 2)" - 21:27)
2. "Perfect Scrambled Eggs" - 7:24)
3. "Christianity Is Stupid" - 6:02)
4. "Proud To Be An American" - 3:50)
5. "(End of Concert)" - 2:25
6. "Mark Hosler Speaks" - 2:54
7. "Four Fingers" - 8:47
