= It's All in Your Head =

It's All in Your Head may refer to:

- It's All in Your Head (book), 2015 book about psychosomatic illness by Suzanne O'Sullivan
- “It’s All in Your Head”, an episode of Bear in the Big Blue House
- It's All in Your Head (Eve 6 album), 2003 album
- It's All in Your Head (Negativland album), 2014 studio album
- It's All in Your Head FM, 2006 live album by Negativland
- "It's All in Your Head" (song), 1996 single by Diamond Rio
