= Heaven (1987 film) =

- Theatrical release poster
- Directed by: Diane Keaton
- Written by: Diane Keaton
- Produced by: Joe Kelly
- Starring: Michael Agbabian; James Allport; Lazaro Arvizubr; Stephen Augustine; Tracy Bauer
- Cinematography: Frederick Elmes; Joe Kelly
- Music by: Howard Shore
- Distributed by: Island Pictures
- Release date: April 17, 1987
- Running time: 80 minutes
- Country: United States
- Language: English

Heaven is a 1987 American documentary film directed by Diane Keaton about beliefs concerning the afterlife and heaven in particular featuring an assortment of clips from classic movies and archival footage.

== People featured in the film ==
- Don King
- Estus Pirkle
- Michael Agbabian
- James Allport
- Lazaro Arvizubr
- Stephen Augustine
- Tracy Bauer

== List of films featured ==
- The Passion of Joan of Arc (1928)
- The Believer's Heaven (1977)
- Metropolis (1927)
- Night of the Demon (1957)
- The Burning Hell (1974)
- Beauty and the Beast (1946)
- A Matter of Life and Death (1946)
- The Green Pastures (1936)

== Production ==
The film was written and directed by Diane Keaton, and features a soundtrack by Howard Shore.

Heaven was Keaton's sole work as a screenwriter.

The film, distributed by Island Pictures, opened in theatres on April 17, 1987 yet closed on May 14 just grossing $77,886 in 27 days.
