= The World Will Decide =

Studio album by Negativland
- Released: November 13, 2020
- Genre: Experimental rock
- Language: English
- Label: Seeland
- Producer: Negativland

Negativland chronology
True False (2019)	The World Will Decide (2020)

The World Will Decide is the 14th studio album by Negativland, released on November 13, 2020.

== Recording and release ==
The release is part of a pair with 2019's True False and was promoted by the band with a Chrome browser extension. A deluxe limited edition of the album includes a screen print, bumper sticker, and digital download of No Brain, a live album recorded on the band's 2019 tour.

== Track listing ==
1. "Unlawful Assembly" – 1:22
2. "Content" – 3:56
3. "Before I Ask" – 4:53
4. "Why Are We Waiting" – 0:42
5. "Create the Visitor" – 4:53
6. "We Can Really Feel Like We're Here" – 3:22
7. "More Data" – 5:46
8. "I Didn't Know I Was Dead" – 1:34
9. "Failure" – 4:29
10. "Don't Don't Get Freaked Out" – 4:20
11. "Anything Else" – 2:27
12. "Attractive Target" – 8:34
13. "Open Your Mouth" – 4:01
14. "Incomprehensible Solution" – 5:54
15. "The World Will Decide" – 7:31

== Personnel ==
Negativland

- Ian Allen – composition, performance, production, recording, mixing, and editing
- Peter Conheim – composition, performance, production, recording, mixing, and editing
- Mark Hosler – composition, performance, production, recording, mixing, and editing
- Don Joyce – composition, performance, production, recording, mixing, and editing
- Jon Leidecker – composition, performance, production, recording, mixing, and editing
- Richard Lyons – composition, performance, production, recording, mixing, and editing
- David Wills – composition, vocals, performance, production, recording, mixing, and editing

Additional personnel

- Kyle Bruckmann
- Drew Daniel
- Tom Dimuzio
- Jem Doulton
- Nava Dunkelman
- Kristin Erickson
- Steve Fisk
- Matthew Hanson-Weller – screen print on deluxe edition
- Erich Hubner
- Dan Lynch – cover, label and booklet paintings
- Ava Mendoza
- Prairie Prince
- M. C. Schmidt
