= Negativland (album) =

Studio album by Negativland
- Released: June 1980
- Recorded: December 1979–April 1980
- Genre: Experimental
- Length: 36:38
- Label: Seeland Records
- Producer: Negativland

Negativland chronology
Negativland (1980)	Points (1981)

Professional ratings
Review scores
Source	Rating
AllMusic	3/5 stars
The Encyclopedia of Popular Music	3/5 stars
MusicHound Rock: The Essential Album Guide	4/5 stars
Spin Alternative Record Guide	5/10

Negativland is Negativland's first album, released in 1980. Each copy of the album has a different cover. The initial pressing was 500 copies. Unlike all other Negativland albums, the album has no titles for the songs, just numbers. It is the rarest Negativland album, next to the misprinted Dispepsi albums and the U2 EP.

== Critical reception ==
AllMusic wrote that "it's a very subtle record on balance, though, only here and there being as flat-out jarring and, dare it be said, epic as later albums, but with a fine ear to offsetting what might be pure ambient sound with a sense of both dynamics and construction." Trouser Press called the album "evocative yet very elusive."

== Track listing ==
All songs by Mark Hosler/Richard Lyons/David Wills.

1. 1 (1:01)
2. 2 (1:25)
3. 3 (2:16)
4. 4 (1:22)
5. 5 (5:19)
6. 6 (1:18)
7. 7 (0:57)
8. 8 (1:01)
9. 9 (2:02)
10. 10 (1:36)
11. 11 (0:47)
12. 12 (0:33)
13. 13 (1:55)
14. 14 (0:38)
15. 15 (2:12)
16. 16 (3:17)
17. 17 (1:12)
18. 18 (1:34)
19. 19 (5:04)
20. 20 (1:09)

== Personnel ==
- Mark Hosler - tapes, electronics, rhythms, Booper, clarinet, organ, viola, loops, guitar, etc.
- Richard Lyons - tapes, electronics, rhythms, Booper, clarinet, organ, viola, loops, guitar, etc.
- David Wills - synthesizer, voice, tape
- Peter Dayton - guitars, viola
- W. Kennedy M. (Bill McFarland) - guitar
- Joan Alderdice - bellbeating
