= It's All in Your Head FM =

It's All In Your Head FM v1.0

Live album by Negativland
- Released: 2006
- Label: Seeland Records

Negativland chronology
No Business (2005)	It's All In Your Head FM v1.0 (2006)	Thigmotactic (2007)

It's All In Your Head FM v1.0 is a 2006 album by the sound collage band Negativland. It was compiled from a series of live recordings made by the band in California (San Francisco and Los Angeles) in October 2005.

The material performed by the band is largely culled from an 11-part series of radio shows done by Negativland member Don Joyce on his weekly radio show Over the Edge, broadcast on the Berkeley, California radio station KPFA. The series was also called "It's All In Your Head", and its theme was to propose, and provide evidence for, the case that there is no God.

The live performance continues in that vein, with many samples of people discussing the various facets of Christianity, Islam, Judaism, and other major religions, and the role of religion in society. It is hosted by Don Joyce in one of his many alter egos, that of Dr. Oslo Norway, chairman of One World Advertising.

The premise of the recording is that with radio's audience having shrunk so much over the past decades, that a radio station would have to do something as outlandish as proclaim the nonexistence of God to get ratings. The CD can be purchased at Negativland performances, but is currently not available for retail sale.

An entirely new version of the work, culled from different performances recorded to multi-track and carefully re-crafted in the studio, was released in September 2014, simply titled It's All In Your Head.
