= Don Joyce =

Don Joyce may refer to:

- Don Joyce (musician) (1944–2015), American musician
- Don Joyce (American football) (1929–2012), American football defensive end
