= A Big 10-8 Place =

Studio album by Negativland
- Released: October 1983
- Recorded: 1982–1983
- Genres: Experimental; sound collage; alternative rock
- Length: 37:37
- Labels: Seeland, Mordam
- Producer: Negativland

Negativland chronology
Points (1981)	A Big 10-8 Place (1983)	Escape from Noise (1987)

Professional ratings
Review scores
Source	Rating
AllMusic	4/5 stars
The Encyclopedia of Popular Music	3/5 stars
MusicHound Rock: The Essential Album Guide	4/5 stars
Spin Alternative Record Guide	7/10

A Big 10-8 Place is the third album by experimental music group Negativland, released in 1983. It was the first album with the involvement of band member Don Joyce. The album's title is a reference to the radio ten-code "10-8," which means "back in service" or "available for next call" in the context of common CB radio usage.

The original release had unusual packaging, and included a small plastic bag of lawn clippings or mulch, a "No Other Possibility" bumper sticker, and a map of Contra Costa County, California, where the band originated.

The album was re-released by Seeland Records, then with distribution from Mordam Records, in 1994. It was re-released again in 2007 by Seeland, packaged with a DVD release of No Other Possibility, Negativland's video release.

== Critical reception ==
AllMusic wrote that the album "fired the opening volley in Negativland's ongoing challenge against copyrights and what is considered public domain." Trouser Press called the album "as much a loving tribute as a scathing indictment of suburbia's soulless facade, the record is a richly detailed, remarkably complex combination of the inorganic (electronics and industrial atmospherics) and the human (voices discuss whatever)." The Chicago Tribune called it a "trippy travelogue."

== Track listing ==
All tracks are written by David Wills/Richard Lyons/Ian Allen/Mark Hosler.

Side One
No.	Title	Length
1.	"Theme from a Big 10-8 Place"	2:58
2.	"A Big 10-8 Place, Pt. One"	13:22
3.	"Clowns and Ballerinas"	1:34

Side Two
No.	Title	Length
1.	"Introduction"	0:49
2.	"Four Fingers"	3:05
3.	"180-G, a Big 10-8 Place, Pt. Two"	15:49
