= Over the Edge Vol. 3: The Weatherman's Dumb Stupid Come-Out Line =

Compilation album (edited radio show) by Negativland
- Released: 1990 (original); August 11, 1998 (reissue)
- Recorded: 1982–1984
- Genre: Experimental
- Length: 90:56
- Labels: SST (original); Seeland (reissue)
- Producer: Negativland

Negativland chronology
Over The Edge Vol. 2 (1989)	Over the Edge Vol. 3: The Weatherman's Dumb Stupid Come-Out Line (1990)	Over The Edge Vol. 4 (1990)

Professional ratings
Review scores
Source	Rating
Allmusic	3/5 stars

The Weatherman's Dumb Stupid Come-Out Line was the third volume in the Over the Edge series, which compiles certain moments from Negativland's radio program of the same name, broadcast on KPFA. This album was edited together from several different broadcasts recorded between 1982 and 1984.

Originally released in 1990 by SST Records on cassette only, it was re-released on August 11, 1998 by Negativland's own label, Seeland Records, as a CD with a booklet (Dad, A Bag is Coming: The Weatherman's Dumb Stupid Dictionary, as told to Peter Diddle) and additional printed matter.

== Track listing ==
1. "One Of Them"

The Weatherman declares that he is homosexual and exhorts gay listeners to come out on the air. Sound clips from films, songs including Jim Stafford's "My Girl Bill", the 1971 film Little Murders, anti-gay sermons and stand-up comedy with gay themes are heard in the background.

1. "The Clorox Cowboy"

Using his "Crystal Microphone" and accompanied by Todd Rundgren's song "International Feel", the Weatherman identifies himself as the "Clorox Cowboy" and gives advice about cleaning and electronic repair, with particular focus on doorbell transformers. Samples include Curtis Hoard's "Centipede" and Ennio Morricone's "Humanity".

== Personnel ==
- David Wills
- Richard Lyons
- Don Joyce
- Mark Hosler
- Chris Grigg
- Ian Allen
