= Over the Edge Vol. 5: Crosley Bendix: The Radio Reviews =

Over the Edge Vol. 5: Crosley Bendix Radio Reviews

Compilation album (Edited Radio Show) by Negativland
- Released: 1993
- Recorded: various
- Genre: Experimental
- Length: 71:13
- Label: Seeland
- Producer: Negativland

Negativland chronology
Over The Edge Vol. 4 (1995)	Over the Edge Vol. 5: Crosley Bendix Radio Reviews (1993)	Over the Edge Vol. 6 (1990)

Crosley Bendix Radio Reviews is a collection of recordings edited from a wealth of material broadcast on KPFA's Over the Edge radio show, hosted by Negativland member Don Joyce weekly. Each recording on this particular disc comes from a different broadcast, all featuring the character Crosley Bendix.

As a regular feature on Over the Edge, Crosley Bendix (dubbed the "Director of Stylistic Premonitions for The Universal Media Netweb") presents Monologues on cultural phenomena, with a typically "Negativland" sense of humor throughout. The selections here are fairly broad examples of Crosley's critical style. Probably his most famous monologue regards the discovery of a new primary color, called "Squant."

This album was released in 1993 by Negativland's own label, Seeland Records, as a CD.

== Track listing ==
1. Style (1989) – 6:15
2. Domestic Art (1987) – 11:33
3. Squant (1993) – 8:41
4. Movies (1987) – 7:13
5. Dance (1988) – 7:25
6. Progress (1984) – 3:25
7. Numbers (1985) – 3:52
8. Electricity (1987) – 7:38
9. Fear (1986) – 5:57
10. Technology (1987) – 9:14

== Personnel ==
- Don Joyce
- Kings House (Rob Wortman, Brook Hinton, Arne Ryason)

== Reception ==
Professional ratings
Review scores
Source	Rating
Allmusic	3/5
