= Truth in advertising =

Truth in advertising may refer to:

- Initiatives and laws against false advertising
- Truth in Advertising (organization), independent nonprofit American advertising watchdog organization
- Truth in Advertising (EP), a 1997 EP by Negativland

== See also ==
- Truth (advertising), an anti-tobacco campaign in the United States
- "Truth and Advertising", an episode of the US television series South Park
