= Truth in Advertising (EP) =

EP by Negativland
- Released: 1997
- Genre: Sound Collage
- Length: 6:13
- Label: Eerie Materials

Negativland chronology
The Letter U and the Numeral 2 (1992)	Truth in Advertising (1997)	Dispepsi (1997)

Truth in Advertising is a 1997 EP by Negativland. It was released as a teaser for their up-coming album "Dispepsi". Some of the material on the EP dates as far back as 1987, where it was used on Over the Edge, the radio show masterminded by former Negativland band member Don Joyce.

== Track listings ==
1. "Truth In Advertising" - 3:17
2. "Greatest Taste Around" - 2:16
3. "Taste In Mind" - 1:40

== Personnel ==
- Mark Hosler - tapes, electronics, rhythms, Booper, clarinet, organ, viola, loops, guitar, etc.
- Richard Lyons - tapes, electronics, rhythms, Booper, clarinet, organ, viola, loops, guitar, etc.
- David Wills - synthesizer, voice, tape
- Peter Dayton - guitars, viola
- W. M. Kennedy - guitar
