= If Footmen Tire You, What Will Horses Do? =

- Theatrical release poster
- Directed by: Ron Ormond
- Screenplay by: Ron Ormond
- Based on: If Footmen Tire You, What Will Horses Do? by Estus Pirkle
- Produced by: Estus Pirkle; Monnie Stanfield
- Starring: Estus Pirkle; Cecil Scaife; Judy Creech
- Cinematography: Ron Ormond; Tim Ormond
- Edited by: Ron Ormond; Tim Ormond
- Distributed by: The Ormond Organization
- Release date: November 17, 1971
- Running time: 53 minutes
- Country: United States
- Language: English

If Footmen Tire You, What Will Horses Do? is a 1971 American Christian exploitation horror film directed by Ron Ormond, featuring Southern Baptist minister Estus Pirkle.

== Background ==
The film is based on and shares its name with a sermon by Estus W. Pirkle held on January 31, 1968 at Camp Zion in Myrtle, Mississippi. The sermon was made available in print, and Pirkle then joined with filmmaker Ron Ormond, a director of exploitation films who had become a born-again Christian after surviving a plane crash, to produce a film adaptation. The film was widely distributed among evangelical churches and church camps in the United States in the 1970s, and remains in use at some, especially in Latin America.

While Ormond and Pirkle made two more films together (The Burning Hell in 1974 and The Believer's Heaven in 1977), If Footmen Tire You, What Will Horses Do? remains their most infamous work.

== Summary ==
If Footmen Tire You, What Will Horses Do? warns of the dangers facing the United States from Communist infiltrators, interspersing scenes of Pirkle preaching with vignettes depicting the violent persecution of Christians in a near-future Southern United States under a totalitarian Communist regime. The film suggests that the only way to avoid the violent repression of such a future is for the youth of America to abandon vices such as violent media (e.g. animated cartoons), drive-ins, dancing, and sexuality, and turn to evangelical Christianity and conservative American nationalism. The title paraphrases Jeremiah 12:5:

If you have run with footmen and they have tired you out, Then how can you compete with horses? If you fall down in a land of peace, How will you do in the thicket of the Jordan?

== Reception and legacy ==
Though critically panned upon initial release, If Footmen Tire You, What Will Horses Do? has since attracted a cult following among secular fans due to its explicit depictions of brutal torture and the heavy-handed and hypocritical nature of its message.

The film has been sampled by the satirical sound collage band Negativland on multiple occasions. In one of the scenes set in Pirkle's imagined Communist future, loudspeakers in internment camps issue proclamations such as "Christianity is stupid, Communism is good, give up!" to detainees for seventeen hours a day, "from five o'clock in the morning 'till ten o'clock at night." Negativland lifted these phrases and played them repeatedly, backed by industrial music and various other sound effects, on the song "Christianity Is Stupid" from their 1987 album Escape from Noise. A more complete version of Pirkle's sermon can be heard on the following Negativland album, 1989's Helter Stupid, which was based on a hoax propagated by the band purporting that "Christianity Is Stupid" had inspired the murders committed by David Brom in 1988.

Video essayist Stephen Broomer argued Ormond's close-ups of Pirkle were used to "much the same end" as the cinema of Slavko Vorkapich distancing itself from theater and as an effective use of brainwashing.

== Availability ==
The film was restored in 2018 and made available to stream for free on filmmaker Nicolas Winding Refn's proprietary service by NWR.

All three of the films made by Pirkle and Ormond were released as part of the Blu-ray box set From Hollywood to Heaven: The Lost and Saved Films of the Ormond Family in June 2023.

== See also ==
- Counterculture of the 1960s
- Cult film
- Plunderphonics
