= Over the Edge Vol. 2: Pastor Dick: Muriel's Purse Fund =

Compilation album (Edited radio show) by Negativland
- Released: 1989 (original); 1996 (reissue)
- Recorded: 1982–1986
- Genre: Experimental
- Length: 73:03
- Labels: SST (original); Seeland (reissue)
- Producer: Negativland

Negativland chronology
Over the Edge Vol. 1½ (1995)	Over the Edge Vol. 2: Pastor Dick: Muriel's Purse Fund (1989)	Over The Edge Vol. 3 (1990)

Professional ratings
Review scores
Source	Rating
Allmusic	4/5 stars

Pastor Dick: Muriel's Purse Fund was the second volume in the Over the Edge series, which compiles certain moments from Negativland's radio program of the same name, broadcast on KPFA. This album was edited together from several different broadcasts recorded between 1982 and 1986.

It was originally released in 1989 by SST Records as an hour long cassette, and was reissued on CD Negativland's own Seeland Records label in 1996. The CD issue runs approximately 73 minutes, and omits some of the cassette content, but includes additional material recorded subsequently, interspersed with the remaining original material. (Most of this newer material came from a Pastor Dick themed 1986 Over The Edge program entitled The J Brigade.) The CD issue also included a tract-like booklet titled Pastor Dick's Flagship Faith Vol. 17 #1, and an offering envelope.

The storyline involves Pastor Dick Seeland (Richard Lyons) going on the air along with the Weatherman (David Wills) to hold a fundraiser to replace money stolen from the church secretary's purse. He asks listeners to call in and name three sins they've committed, rating their severity on a scale to determine the amount of money, up to $5, they need to pledge. For every dollar, he promises to take a sip of André champagne. By the end of the program, the preacher is soused and rambling about Noah's drunkenness and Jesus changing water into wine, amid woozy sound collage, a male caller repeating "fuck you" 43 times, and samples of the song "I'm Sorry." The program ends with Mickey Rooney giving the concluding speech from the 1935 film version of A Midsummer Night's Dream.

== Track listing ==
1. "A Thrilling Choice, Dayle Embree Testifies" [CD only]
2. "Ask Pastor Dick, Muriel's Purse Fund, Bible Quiz"
3. "Hell Car"
4. "Men's Continental Faith Breakfast Incorporated, Your First Day In Heaven, More Bible Quiz"
5. "Christianity and the Cults, Joseph Smith, Brainwashing at the Cuckoo Club"
6. "I Love My B.I.B.L.E., More Bible Quiz, The Weatherman Clears It Up"
7. "Whisper a Prayer"
8. "Drunk At Last, A Date With Ham, etc."
9. "Forty-three Fuck You's, Sign Off and the News"

== Personnel ==
- Richard Lyons
- David Wills
- Don Joyce
- Mark Hosler
- Chris Grigg
- Helen Holt
- Ian Allen
- Kent Hastings
