= Over the Edge, Volume 6: The Willsaphone Stupid Show =

Over the Edge Vol. 6: The Willsaphone Stupid Show

Compilation album (Edited Radio Show) by Negativland
- Released: 1993
- Recorded: various
- Genre: Experimental
- Length: 147:37
- Label: Seeland
- Producer: Negativland

Negativland chronology
Over the Edge Vol. 5 (1990)	Over the Edge Vol. 6: The Willsaphone Stupid Show (1993)	Over the Edge Vol. 7 (1990)

The Willsaphone Stupid Show is a two CD collection of recordings edited from two different broadcasts on KPFA's Over the Edge radio show, hosted by Don Joyce.

This album was released in 1993 by Negativland's own label, Seeland Records, as a CD.

== Track listing ==
THE WILLSAPHONE STUPID SHOW

1. Moments to Remember, Raining Hard, etc. (13:30)
2. I'm the Vegetable, Wired Up House, Steamin' Mad at Dirt, etc. (10:30)
3. HOME CABLE T.V. REPAIR CORNER (8:26)
4. Fruitcakes, Suka-Brand Coffee, Power Failure, Citizen's Band Parakeet, etc. (10:34)
5. Moldy Bagels (2:05)
6. Cats, In Between Frequencies, etc. (3:50)
7. (More) Weatherman vs. The Monkees, HOME CLEANING FOCUS CORNER, etc. (12:14)
8. A Rash of Rabid Skunks (2:19)
9. Dreams About Fire, Mr. Dirt, White Clouds in the Sky and The End (9:43)

THE WILLSAPHONE STUPID SHOW II

1. Oven Noises (3:40)
2. Introduction, First Club Soda, Toads, etc. (10:51)
3. Fuck You, Tough Darts, Jingle Bells, etc. (5:32)
4. Weather Reports, WEATHER HOT LINE (7:54)
5. Toilet Noises, Lumpy Gravy, etc. (4:12)
6. Comb Music (9:23)
7. Acting Silly, Chewing Up ShaNaNa, etc. (5:05)
8. Ho-Ho-Ho, No More Recordings, Easy-Off, etc. (6:54)
9. FAKE BACON AND ELECTRONIC MUSIC HOT LINE (7:58)
10. (Still More) Weatherman vs. The Monkees, Casual Talk (5:54)
11. Barnacle Bill and Final Comments (6:43)

== Personnel ==
- David Wills
- Don Joyce
- Richard Lyons
- Buzzy Linhart
- Chris Grigg
- Mark Hosler
