= These Guys Are from England and Who Gives a Shit =

Compilation album by Negativland
- Released: 2001
- Recorded: 1989 – 1991
- Genre: Sound collage
- Label: Seelard
- Producer: Negativland

Negativland chronology
The ABCs of Anarchism (1999)	These Guys Are from England and Who Gives a Shit (2001)	Deathsentences of the Polished and Structurally Weak (2002)

Professional ratings
Review scores
Source	Rating
Allmusic	4/5 stars

These Guys Are from England and Who Gives a Shit is a 2001 compilation album by Negativland. It contains the two tracks from the band's 1991 EP U2 alongside related recordings from the band's Over the Edge radio show and tracks recorded live at the Great American Music Hall in San Francisco. As the U2 EP had been withdrawn due to a legal dispute with Island Records, the album is billed as a bootleg and ostensibly released under "Seelard Records", a misspelling of the band's Seeland Records. Several of the live tracks sample the same Casey Kasem outtakes that had appeared on U2, including a spoken portion quoting "(I Can't Get No) Satisfaction". Other tracks reference the band's struggles with their former label SST Records and the 1960 U-2 incident.

== Track listings ==
Tracks 3 and 4 are from the original 1991 EP.

No.	Title	Length
1.	"Over the Edge"	7:59
2.	"Long Distance Dedication #1 (Live)"	6:19
3.	"I Still Haven't Found What I'm Looking For (1991 A Cappella Mix)"	7:15
4.	"I Still Haven't Found What I'm Looking For (Special Edit Radio Mix)"	5:47
5.	"Long Distance Dedication #2 (Live)"	5:07
6.	"Copying is a Criminal Act (Live)"	5:07
7.	"Wake Up America (Live)"	4:03
8.	"The Black Lady of Espionage (Live)"	5:00
9.	"Deliberate Sabotage (Live)"	2:59
10.	"I Still Haven't Found What I'm Looking For (A Cappella Version) (Live)"	7:16
11.	"I Still Haven't Found What I'm Looking For (Edited Special Edit Radio Mix)"	5:42

After 8:56 of silence, track 11 contains a further 17 seconds of Casey Kasem's voice.

== See also ==
- The Letter U and the Numeral 2
- Fair Use: The Story of the Letter U and the Numeral 2
