= Over the Edge Vol. 4: Dick Vaughn's Moribund Music of the '70s =

Over the Edge Vol. 4: Dick Vaughn's Moribund Music Of The '70s

Compilation album (Edited Radio Show) by Negativland
- Released: 1990 (original); October 2001 (reissue)
- Recorded: various
- Genre: Experimental
- Length: ??:??
- Labels: SST (original); Seeland (reissue)
- Producer: Negativland

Negativland chronology
Over The Edge Vol. 3 (1994)	Over the Edge Vol. 4: Dick Vaughn's Moribund Music Of The '70s (1990)	Over the Edge Vol. 5: Crosley Bendix: The Radio Reviews (1993)

Dick Vaughn's Moribund Music Of The '70s is a collection of recordings edited from a wealth of material broadcast on KPFA's Over the Edge radio show, hosted by Don Joyce weekly and featuring members of Negativland, as well as material recorded at a Live Negativland show just after the "U2 Scandal." The recordings are broken up into two discs, and within that contain bits and pieces of many different Over The Edge Shows.

Everything centers around one recurring character that has made many appearances on Over The Edge, that of radio personality Dick Vaughn, played by Richard Lyons. Track one of Disc one is taken from a recording that was played to live audiences during the tour that took place just after the U2 Scandal. Tracks 2 through 9 are taken from "The California Superstation" broadcast, a parody of corporate radio which had some listeners convinced KPFA had actually undergone a format change. This was also hosted by Lyons as Dick Vaughn, and performed with Negativland's typical tongue-placed-in-cheek. Tracks 10 and 11 are snippets taken from other Dick Vaughn "pranks", in both cases involving other people's radio shows. Tracks 12 and 13 of disc 1, and tracks 1 through 6 of disc two are taken from the "Moribund Music Of The '70s" show, in which Dick Vaughn begins the first-ever "'70s Nostalgia" broadcast, trying to emulate an actual radio program from the 1970s. Tracks 7 through 10 of disc two are all taken from different shows, and feature commentary on the "Moribund" show, another Dick Vaughn "prank", and a 15 minute excerpt from the "Dick Is Dead" show. Finally, Tracks 11 and 12 are taken from a live Negativland performance, and includes the complete tape that opens the CD.

Originally released in 1990 by SST Records on cassette only, it was re-released in 2001 by Negativland's own label, Seeland Records, as a CD. The CD version contains material not included on the original release, and also omits and rearranges some material from the original.

== Reception ==
Professional ratings
Review scores
Source	Rating
Pitchfork	7.5/10

== Track listing ==
DISC ONE

1. "Introduction" (1:37)
2. "Ron Baile's School of Broadcast, The Mating Line, More On Music, etc." (8:14)
3. "James Gabbert's Delight, Pat Boone's Cow, Evening Magazine, etc." (7:44)
4. "Roy Storey's Sports Line #1" (2:46)
5. "More More On Music, Suicide Man, Idle Threats, etc." (7:51)
6. "Celebrity Wives Quiz, More Idle Threats, People Are Talking, etc." (9:29)
7. "Roy Storey's Sports Line #2" (3:18)
8. "Earwitness News and Back to More Music, etc." (9:00)
9. "TV Trivia, Dick or Dukes of Hazzard, More More on Music, Suicide Man Again, etc." (5:34)
10. "Ringo is Dead" (6:55)
11. "An Apology to Roy (Roy Storey's Sports Line #3)" (3:14)
12. "Introduction, Witness for the Documentation, Disclaimers and Floaters, etc." (8:03)
13. "More Music, How to Use Your Cubulax, Ford For President, etc." (5:14)

DISC TWO

1. "Off-Air Comments #1, Household Vocable, Wrong Cues Begin, Is He Stoned?, etc." (4:27)
2. "News Headlines, More Wrong Cues, Top 10 Countdown, etc." (6:15)
3. "Off-Air Survey: You MUST Be Hearing These Recordings!" (6:58)
4. "Countdown Continues, Still More Wrong Cues, Moribund Music of the 80's, etc." (5:17)
5. "Off-Air Comments #2, Suicide Man: It Doesn't Seem to Be Flowing Very Well, Ruining the Concept, Six Months of My Life, etc." (7:41)
6. "More Off-Air Surveys: Rainbow Gets Jammed, Suicide Man's Universal Theory" (6:38)
7. "Oslo Norway and Psychic Freeze" (4:38)
8. "Crosley Bendix and the Damage Done" (6:30)
9. "Dick Vaughn, Popular TV-mentalist" (1:22)
10. "Dick Is Dead" (15:20)
11. "A Tape for All Deaths" (5:00)
12. "The Hell-Bound Plane" (7:13)

== Personnel ==
- Don Joyce
- David Wills
- Mark Hosler
- Richard Lyons
- Chris Grigg
- Ian Allen
- Earl Yazel
- Jim Bryan
- Doug Wulff.
- Rob Wortman
- Arne Ryason
- Brook Hinton (Kings House)
- Dr. Oslo Norway
- Crosley Bendix
- Peter Conheim
- George Prepared
- Enrico Gomez
- Steve Vernon
