= Negativ(e)land: Live on Tour =

Live album by Negativland
- Released: 1997
- Genre: Sound collage
- Length: 66:05
- Label: SST (355)

Professional ratings
Review scores
| Source | Rating |
|---|---|
| AllMusic | 2.5/5 stars |

Negativ(e)land: Live on Tour is a 1997 live album, released by SST Records. It was released against the wishes of the band, who had left SST following the U2 Scandal. It was released to compete with Dispepsi, a Negativland album.

== Track listing ==
1. "Christianity Is Stupid" - 4:20
2. "Murder and Music" - 6:59
3. "Escape from Noise" - 5:37
4. "Time" - 13:49
5. "Fourfingers" (sic) - 8:14
6. "The Record Industry" - 13:47
7. "Christianity Is Stupid" (pt. 2) - 13:17
