= Helter Stupid =

Studio album by Negativland
- Released: 1989
- Recorded: 1988–1989
- Genres: Sound collage; plunderphonics
- Length: 47:26
- Label: SST (252)
- Producer: Negativland

Negativland chronology
Escape from Noise (1987)	Helter Stupid (1989)	U2 (1991)

Professional ratings
Review scores
Source	Rating
AllMusic	4/5 stars
Christgau's Consumer Guide	A−
The Encyclopedia of Popular Music	3/5 stars
The Great Alternative & Indie Discography	6/10
MusicHound Rock: The Essential Album Guide	5/5 stars
Pitchfork	7.2/10
Spin Alternative Record Guide	8/10
Tom Hull – on the Web	B

Helter Stupid is Negativland's fifth studio album, released in 1989. It is a concept album focused on the media coverage of a hoax formulated by the band claiming that "Christianity Is Stupid" from their previous album, Escape from Noise, had inspired David Brom to murder his family in Rochester, Minnesota, as well as other moral panics related to popular music.

== Structure ==
The first half of the album is composed of the tracks "Prologue" and "Helter Stupid". The two together form an extended piece lasting 22 minutes. The concept, and some of the sampled material, came from a San Francisco television news program that was duped by a media hoax perpetrated by Negativland while promoting its previous album, Escape from Noise. Other samples used include those from Rev. Estus Pirkle (further samples from If Footmen Tire You, What Will Horses Do?, as used on "Christianity Is Stupid"), "Spring Rain" by Bebu Silvetti, Lenny Bruce, an interview with Charles Manson, and "Helter Skelter" by the Beatles (in reference to the Helter Skelter theory of the Tate–LaBianca murders).

Parts of the "Perfect Cut" tracks on Side 2 draw from samples of "The Winning Score", a 1977 presentation by TM Century, producers of radio jingles and imaging.

Chumbawamba sampled Helter Stupid extensively on their 2000 album WYSIWYG.

== Critical reception ==
Trouser Press wrote that "as inspired propagandists coming to terms with an ability to manipulate the truth, Negativland shifted their mindfuck campaign to a higher plane with Helter Stupid. The Rough Guide to Rock called Helter Stupid "probably [the band's] best and most accessible album."

== Track listing ==
1. "Prologue"
2. "Helter Stupid"
3. "The Perfect Cut (Canned Music)"
4. "The Perfect Cut (Rooty Poops)"
5. "The Perfect Cut (Good As Gold)"
6. "The Perfect Cut (Piece of Meat)"
7. "The Perfect Cut (White Rabbit and a Dog Named Gidget)"
8. "The Perfect Cut (11 Minutes)"
9. "The Perfect Cut (48 Hours)"

== Personnel ==
- Richard Lyons (credited as "Dick Vaughn")
- David Wills (uncredited)
- Don Joyce (uncredited)
- Mark Hosler (uncredited)
- Chris Grigg (uncredited)
