= No Business =

Studio album by Negativland
- Released: May 10, 2005
- Recorded: 2004–05
- Genre: Experimental
- Length: 36:22
- Label: Seeland
- Producer: Negativland

Negativland chronology
Deathsentences of the Polished and Structurally Weak (2002)	No Business (2005)	Thigmotactic (2008)

Professional ratings
Aggregate scores
Source	Rating
Metacritic	69/100
Review scores
Source	Rating
AllMusic	3.5/5 stars
Pitchfork	7.5/10
Tiny Mix Tapes	4/5 stars
PopMatters	6/10
The Wire	4/5 stars

No Business is the tenth album by the sound collage band Negativland. While the songs encompass a variety of topics, the overarching theme of the album is copyright issues, especially those pertaining to peer-to-peer file sharing. Although the title track and especially the track "Downloading" are the only ones that explicitly relate to this topic, the rest of the album can technically be considered so, because they consist entirely of samples, unlike Negativland's other albums.

== History ==
The album is especially unique in Negativland's body of work because it is their first to not contain any original sounds by Negativland, but use exclusively "stolen" sound. It does not come in a regular-sized CD case. Instead, it comes in a flip-open package about the size of a book covered with images of copyrighted characters (again referencing copyright issues.) The package contains the CD and two other items: Two Relationships to a Cultural Public Domain, a 49-page essay book pertaining to copyright law; and a yellow whoopie cushion with a black copyright symbol on it, referencing the band's motto-of-sorts "N©!". The CD itself also contains a bonus music video for an earlier track, "Gimme the Mermaid", which first appeared on Fair Use: The Story of the Letter U and the Numeral 2. The surreal video was created by then-Disney animator Tim Maloney using his company's equipment during after-hours, and is the first-ever music video for a Negativland cut. One can load the CD on a computer and check its contents to find the video.

The audio tapes used to create the song "God Bull" on this album (from Disneyland's "Great Moments with Mr. Lincoln" attraction, one of many sets of tapes acquired from a former employee) would later inspire the animatronic Abraham Lincoln in the Negativlandland exhibit, opened in September 2005, in Manhattan's Gigantic Artspace gallery. The audio used in the Lincoln statue, in contrast, comes from blooper tapes. The sound engineer telling Lincoln's voice actor what to do is left untouched, but Lincoln's own voice is edited into madness, conveying the image of a robot on the verge of breaking down.

The songs "Favorite Things" and "No Business" both had music videos made and released on the DVD Our Favorite Things in October 2007, along with Negativland's other "hits".

== Track listing ==
1. "Old Is New" – 1:19
2. "No Business" – 4:13
3. "Downloading" – 9:51
4. "Favorite Things" – 1:58
5. "God Bull" – 4:59
6. "Keep Rollin'" – 3:12
7. "Piece A Pie" – 8:40
8. "New Is Old" – 1:32
9. "No Business Again" – 0:36

Video (available on CD): "Gimme The Mermaid" 4:42
