= True False =

Studio album by Negativland
- Released: October 25, 2019
- Genre: Experimental rock
- Length: 53:12 (compact disc); 64:33 (vinyl LP)
- Language: English
- Label: Seeland
- Producer: Negativland

Negativland chronology
Over the Edge Vol. 9: The Chopping Channel (2016)	True False (2019)	The World Will Decide (2020)

True False is the thirteenth studio album by American experimental rock band Negativland. It has received positive reception from critics. It is a companion piece to 2020's The World Will Decide.

== Reception ==
The editorial staff of AllMusic Guide gave the release four out of five stars, with reviewer Paul Simpson summing it up as "both absurdly humorous and frighteningly relevant". S. David of Tiny Mix Tapes gave True False four out of five, writing that the dense lyrics with their attempt to expose "false dichotomies" "mostly succeeds" and pointing out the humor in the recording.

== Track listing ==
1. "Either Or" – 0:47
2. "Limbo" – 4:14
3. "Discernment" – 4:30
4. "Certain Men" – 4:59
5. "Melt the North Pole" – 3:03
6. "Fourth of July" – 3:37
7. "Mounting the Puppy" – 3:02
8. "One Bee at a Time" – 2:53
9. "Secret Win" – 0:55
10. "Destroying Anything" – 5:04
11. "Cadillac" – 5:18
12. "This Is Not Normal" – 3:29
13. "Yesterday Hates Today" – 1:43
14. "True False" – 9:38

Vinyl LP bonus tracks

15. "Melt the North Pole" (Flat Version) – 3:21
16. "This Is Not Normal" (Normal Version) – 8:00

== Personnel ==
Negativland

- Ian Allen – composition, performance, production, recording, mixing, and editing
- Peter Conheim – composition, performance, production, recording, mixing, and editing
- Mark Hosler – composition, performance, production, recording, mixing, and editing
- Don Joyce – composition, performance, production, recording, mixing, and editing
- Jon Leidecker – composition, performance, production, recording, mixing, and editing
- Richard Lyons – composition, performance, production, recording, mixing, and editing
- David Wills – composition, vocals, performance, production, recording, mixing, and editing

Additional personnel

- Thomas Dimuzio – mastering
- Nava Dunkelman – percussion on "Yesterday Hates Today"
- Dan Lynch – cover, label and booklet paintings
- Ava Mendoza – guitar on "Mounting the Puppy"
- The Not Normal Animal Chorus – vocals on "This Is Not Normal"
  - Aasha
  - Beatrice
  - Dee Dee
  - Méabh de Siún
  - Neela
  - Ruby
  - Savanna
  - Stella
  - Vivian
- Prairie Prince – drums on "Discernment" and "Melt the North Pole"
- M. C. Schmidt – prepared piano on "Destroying Anything"
