= Happy Heroes =

EP by Negativland
- Released: March 1998
- Genre: Sound Collage
- Length: 26:23
- Label: Seeland Records
- Producer: Negativland

Negativland chronology
Dispepsi (1997)	Happy Heroes (1998)	The ABCs of Anarchism (1999)

Professional ratings
Review scores
Source	Rating
AllMusic	2.5/5 stars

Happy Heroes is an EP by sound collage and experimental musical group Negativland, released in 1998.

== Critical reception ==
Memphis Flyer wrote that the EP "delivers more bang for the buck – particularly if you have a wicked sense of humor and high threshold for aural pain." The Rough Guide to Rock called it "more expert sampler anarchy."

== Track listings ==
1. "Mertz #1" - 1:43
2. "Jolly Green Giant" - 7:23
3. "Mertz #2" - 1:14
4. "Chicken Diction" - 3:49
5. "The Black Hole Tube" - 3:48
6. "O.J. And His Personal Trainer Kill Ron and Nicole" - 3:12
7. "Happy Hero: The Remedia Megamix" - 5:02
8. "Mertz End" - 0:13

== Personnel ==
- Mark Hosler - tapes, electronics, rhythms, Booper, clarinet, organ, viola, loops, guitar, etc.
- Richard Lyons - tapes, electronics, rhythms, Booper, clarinet, organ, viola, loops, guitar, etc.
- David Wills - synthesizer, voice, tape
- Peter Dayton - guitars, viola
- W. M. Kennedy - guitar
- Ernst Long - Trumpet
- Phil Friehofner - Organ
