= Free (Negativland album) =

Studio album by Negativland
- Released: 1993
- Recorded: 1991–1992
- Genre: Experimental
- Length: 58:57
- Label: Seeland
- Producer: Negativland

Negativland chronology
| The Letter U and the Numeral 2 (1992) | Free (1993) | Fair Use: The Story of the Letter U and the Numeral 2 (1995) |

Free is the sixth studio album by Negativland. In the wake of leaving SST Records, Negativland revived their self-owned Seeland Records label, signed a distribution deal with Mordam Records, and released this album. The main topics are about liberty, the media, and what it means to be free. "Free" has found sounds, stories, and songs about a well-known convenience store, torture, the quality of urban life, Cadillacs, firearms, the bible, interstate trucking, geriatric discomfort, big dogs, bicycle safety, alcohol consumption, driving in circles, death, organ buttons, religious dialectics, and the truth about The Star-Spangled Banner.

Professional ratings
Review scores
| Source | Rating |
|---|---|
| Allmusic | link |

== Track listing ==
1. "Freedom's Waiting" – 2:21
2. "Cityman" – 5:56
3. "The Gun and the Bible" – 2:48
4. "Truck Stop Drip Drop" – 4:00
5. "The Bottom Line" – 3:25
6. "Crumpled Farm" – 4:23
7. "Happy the Harmonica" – 10:01 (Cover of a piece by Frank Luther )
8. "Pip Digs Pep" – 4:51
9. "We Are Driven" – 7:04
10. "View to the Sun" – 3:58
11. "I Am God" – 5:19
12. "Our National Anthem" – 4:51
