= Over the Edge Vol. 8: Sex Dirt =

Compilation album (Edited Radio Show) by Negativland
- Released: 1995
- Genre: Experimental
- Label: Seeland
- Producer: Negativland

Negativland chronology
Over The Edge Vol. 7 (1994)	Over the Edge Vol. 8: Sex Dirt (1995)	Over the Edge Vol. 9: The Chopping Channel (2016)

Professional ratings
Review scores
Source	Rating
AllMusic	4/5 stars
The Encyclopedia of Popular Music	2/5 stars

Sex Dirt is the eighth volume in the Over The Edge series distills a single episode of Negativland's radio program Over the Edge, broadcast on KPFA.

Unlike previous volumes of the Over The Edge series, this disc represents a live, improvisational performance by the group as a whole. Most Over The Edge Broadcasts do not include all of Negativland, and are mostly theme based rather than music based. This show, however, focuses heavily on the performance angle, as seen in many of Negativland's live shows. While the recording is theme-oriented, and still has the same flavor as the majority of Over The Edge Broadcasts, the format is somewhat different and is much more "musical."

This album was released in 1995 on Negativland's Seeland label. The CD package includes a detailed "Sexual I.Q. Test" insert and a custom-printed moist towelette.

== Track listing ==
1. A Special Opening (0:56)
2. Sex Dirt (7:59)
3. Shake Your Pants #2 (4:36)
4. Pump Gag (3:46)
5. Lick The Crack (7:03)
6. Penis And Sperm (3:01)
7. Gonna Sing Now (3:39)
8. Too Much Spurt (2:39)
9. Digital Fantasy Man (5:05)
10. Almost Lost It There (2:22)
11. Don't Stop Doin' It (2:03)
12. I Don't Want Anything In The Toilet (5:28)
13. Seat Bee Sate (6:16)
14. Shake Your Pants #1 (5:37)
15. Getting Sexy (7:20)

== Personnel ==
- David Wills
- Chris Grigg
- Mark Hosler
- Don Joyce
- Byram Abbott
- Allison Holt
- Cindy Mah
- Peter Dayton
- Some friend of David's
- Jessica from KPFA
