= Deathsentences of the Polished and Structurally Weak =

Soundtrack album by Negativland
- Released: October 1, 2002
- Recorded: 2002
- Genres: Experimental; Electroacoustic
- Length: 45:00
- Label: Seeland
- Producer: Negativland

Negativland chronology
These Guys Are from England and Who Gives a Shit (2001)	Deathsentences of the Polished and Structurally Weak (2002)	No Business (2005)

Deathsentences of the Polished and Structurally Weak is an album and booklet by Negativland. The band describes the project as "a 6 by 12 inch 64-page full-color book which comes with a 45-minute CD soundtrack."

== Booklet ==
The accompanying booklet is a 6 by 12 inch 64-page full-color book packaged inside of a large die-cut automotive courtesy envelope. The band's website describes the book as "a poignant, voyeuristic, disturbing, and occasionally funny glimpse into lives which may be very different from your own...or eerily similar."

Compiled by band member Richard Lyons, the book comprises photos of smashed-up cars in a junkyard; next to each crumpled car is reprinted the text of a note or letter or list found in the car.

In 1997, long before the book was released, Richard Lyons described the project and read excerpts from selections of the found text for an episode of the Public Radio program This American Life.

== Reception ==
Professional ratings
Aggregate scores
Source	Rating
Metacritic	59/100
Review scores
Source	Rating
AllMusic	3/5 stars
Blender	3/5 stars
Magnet	3.5/5 stars
Pitchfork	4.3/10
Stylus	6.7/10
Uncut	4/10

CMJ New Music Monthly said, "A multimedia project focusing on the disturbing beauty of car crashes. The CD is 45 minutes of unlistenable noise with nary a melody nor beat to be found, but Deathsentences' beauty is in its presentation: The bankruptcy-inducing packaging includes a lavish, glossy 64-page book (full of photos of various deceased autos and transcriptions of the grammar-defying letters found within)."

== CD and track listing ==
"The CD is a meticulously-layered, ever-shifting electro-acoustic soundscape created to accompany the book. No bass lines, no melody, no dialogue, no singing, no beat - the sound of Negativland's recording studio being destroyed in a car crash."

All tracks by Negativland:

1. "Only You Can Rock Me" – 2:37
2. "Pack it Up" – 3:05
3. "Arbory Hill" – 3:26
4. "Ain't No Baby" – 5:29
5. "Lookin' Out for #1" – 2:51
6. "Hot & Ready" – 1:39
7. "Cherry" – 5:40
8. "Don't Fool Me" – 5:48
9. "#1 Rep" – 2:59
10. "One More for the Rodeo" – 4:44
11. "Born to Loose" – 2:08
12. "When They Ring the Golden Bells" – 4:10

== Personnel ==
- Mark Hosler - tapes, electronics, rhythms, Booper, clarinet, organ, viola, loops, guitar, etc.
- Richard Lyons - tapes, electronics, rhythms, Booper, clarinet, organ, viola, loops, guitar, etc.
- David Wills - synthesizer, voice, tape
- Peter Dayton - guitars, viola
- W. M. Kennedy - guitar
- Jonathan Land - processed guitars, electronics
