= It's All in Your Head (Negativland album) =

Studio album by Negativland
- Released: October 13, 2014
- Genre: Experimental, avant-garde
- Length: 103:03
- Label: Seeland Records

Negativland chronology
Thigmotactic (2008)	It's All in Your Head (2014)	True False (2019)

Professional ratings
Review scores
Source	Rating
AllMusic	3.5/5 stars
Exclaim!	6/10

It's All in Your Head is the twelfth studio album by experimental band Negativland, which was released on October 13, 2014. The album is based on the live album, It's All in Your Head FM. Like the live album, it deals with humans and certain types of religions humans believe in.

== Packaging ==
The album was packaged in an actual copy of the King James Bible, with two CD envelopes, a printed insert, and two stickers applied to the outside over: One of a hybrid religious symbol combining the Christian cross, the Jewish Star of David, and the Islamic star and crescent within the outline of a human head on the front cover, and a Negativland logo sticker on the back cover. Each copy was hand assembled by the members of the band; the video trailer for the album on the band's Vimeo channel contains footage of the band members assembling the package. An alternate package utilizing copies of the Quran was also created. Both physical editions went out of print rather quickly. Via the band's Facebook page, band member Mark Hosler announced in November 2022 that a second edition of the Bible packaging was in the works.

== Track listing ==
1. "Sign On"
2. "In the Beginning"
3. "Relatively Optimistic Notions"
4. "The Way We Know Things"
5. "Jar the Ear"
6. "Alone with Just a Story"
7. "Viewpoint"
8. "Time Can Do So Much"
9. "Wildlife Tonight"
10. "New Management"
11. "We're All Muhammads Now"
12. "Holy War"
13. "This Thing Is Not Good"
14. "Right Might"
15. "Antinomian Phase"
16. "Push the Button"
17. "I Gotta Be Me"
18. "The Smell of Onions"
19. "Sign Off"
