= Over the Edge Vol. 1: JAMCON'84 =

Over the Edge Vol. 1: JAMCON '84

Compilation album (Edited Radio Show) by Negativland
- Released: 1985 (original); 1994 (reissue)
- Recorded: 1985
- Genres: Experimental, spoken word
- Length: 73:51
- Labels: SST (original); Seeland (reissue)
- Producer: Negativland

Negativland chronology
Over the Edge Vol. 1: JAMCON '84 (1985)	Over the Edge Vol. 1½ (1985)

JAMCON '84 was the first volume in the Over the Edge series, which distills portions of Negativland's radio program Over the Edge, broadcast on KPFA. This album was edited together from at least three different broadcasts recorded between January and July 1985.

The first program, "JAMCON '84," consists of tracks 1 through 5. It is presented as a radio documentary covering a convention of amateur radio jammers, with commentary on radio jamming and culture jamming, and the history and cultures surrounding them. The second program, "Negativland's 4th of July Stockholders' Picnic," is composed of tracks 6 and 7. It is presented as a stockholders' meeting for the Universal Media Netweb (Don Joyce's fictional radio network that supposedly presents the Over the Edge program) with Joyce's character Crosley Bendix giving updates and reports regarding their recent projects in a parody of the positive-thinking movement in business. The last program - and Track 8 of the disc - is "Body English," and is presented as live coverage of President Ronald Reagan's second inaugural address.

Originally released in 1985 by SST Records on cassette only, it was re-released in 1994 by Negativland's own label, Seeland Records, as a CD with additional tracks featuring the two additional programs. The original cassette release contained the "JAMCON '84" program on side A, and a program called "The Starting Line with Dick Goodbody" on side B. "The Starting Line" Program appears on Over the Edge Vol. 1½.

== Track listing ==
1. "Introduction, JamJamJam, A Little History, Jam This Guy: An Interview with W6DR, Jamming the "Sports Line", Am I On?, Three Year Olds on the Air, etc.."
2. "Crosley Bendix Reviews JamArt and Cultural Jamming"
3. "The Worst Programming Ever, Mind Jamming, A Report by Rex Everything, etc.."
4. "C. Elliot Friday's Presidential Campaign Shortwave Broadcast (Live from Howland Island)"
5. "Two or Three People Listening, You Motherfucking Son of a Sack of Piece of Shit, Attempts to Jam and The End"
6. "Walking and Driving and Hiking to the Picnic, Introduction to the Show, Parade of Condiments" [CD only]
7. "Stockholders' Meeting (with Crosley Bendix), Insects in Your Pop Bottle, An Abrupt Ending" [CD only]
8. "Body English" [CD only]

== Personnel ==
- Richard Lyons
- David Wills
- Don Joyce
- Mark Hosler
- Chris Grigg
- Helen Holt
- Ian Allen
- Kent Hastings
- Peter Dayton
- Stoney Burke
- Dan Ruderman
- John Reiger
- Vic Bedoian
- Russ Jennings
- Julia Randall
