= Bound by Law? Tales from the Public Domain =

2008 comic book about copyright

Bound by Law?: Tales from the Public Domain
- Bound by Law?: Tales from the Public Domain cover

Publication information
- Publisher: Duke University Press
- Genre: Non-fiction comics
- No. of issues: 1

Creative team
- Written by: Keith Aoki; James Boyle; Jennifer Jenkins

Bound by Law?: Tales from the Public Domain is a comic book about intellectual property law and the public domain published in 2008 by Duke University Press. Written by Keith Aoki, James Boyle and Jennifer Jenkins and supported by the Center for the Study of the Public Domain at the Duke Law School, the book was first released in a free digital edition under a Creative Commons license in 2006. The 2008 edition has an introduction by Cory Doctorow and a foreword by Davis Guggenheim.

The comic was widely reviewed, as an editor's pick by Choice: Current Reviews for Academic Libraries and by the Michigan Law Review among others.

The comic follows a fictional filmmaker named Akiko who struggles with the practicalities of applying the fair use doctrine while making a documentary film. The book is "illustrated with a mix of hand-drawn artwork and collages of pop culture images".

The book has also been used as a resource for educators, recommended by the National Writing Project and used by workshops at the Ohio State University.
