= The Letter U and the Numeral 2 =

EP by Negativland
- Released: 1992
- Genre: Experimental
- Length: 25:56
- Label: SST
- Producer: Negativland

Negativland chronology
Guns (1992)	The Letter U and the Numeral 2 (1992)	Free (1993)

Professional ratings
Review scores
Source	Rating
Allmusic	4/5 stars

The Letter U and the Numeral 2 is a 96-page magazine and 25-minute CD by Negativland detailing their conflict with the band U2, over Negativland's EP of the same name. It was released in 1992 as a limited edition of 4000 copies. Two months after its release, SST Records blocked its distribution with a lawsuit claiming, among other things, copyright infringement based on reproductions of press releases sent to the press by SST; "in essence, suing the band for printing (their) threat to sue the band". SST's lawsuit is similar to the "Streisand effect".

Three years later, Negativland re-released this as Fair Use: The Story of the Letter U and the Numeral 2. It included "Crosley Bendix Discusses the U.S. Copyright Act" plus nine other tracks.

== Track listing ==
1. "Crosley Bendix Discusses the U.S. Copyright Act" - 25:56

== Personnel ==
- Mark Hosler
- Richard Lyons
- David Wills
- Don Joyce
- Chris Grigg

== See also ==
- These Guys Are from England and Who Gives a Shit
