= Guns (EP) =

EP by Negativland
- Released: 1992
- Recorded: 1991
- Genre: Sound collage
- Length: 16:41
- Labels: SST Records; Seeland Records
- Producer: Negativland

Negativland chronology
| U2 (1991) | Guns (1992) | The Letter U and the Numeral 2 (1992) |

Professional ratings
Review scores
| Source | Rating |
|---|---|
| AllMusic | 3/5 stars |

Guns is the name of the 1992 EP by the experimental music and sound collage band Negativland. It was released as a replacement for their withdrawn EP U2. The cover art reuses that which appears on U2. The album is about the appeal of guns and their place in American history. "Then" includes samples from western movies and radio shows of the 1940s and 1950s, mixed with audio from the film Son of the Morning Star. "Now" samples 1980s and 1990s commercials which marketed guns to women, mixed with the original radio reports from the John F. Kennedy assassination and Robert F. Kennedy assassination.

== Track listing ==
1. "Then" - 8:05
2. "Now" - 8:36

== Notes ==
The back of the EP has a tongue-in-cheek letter to U2 regarding the infamous "U2" Incident:

This recording is dedicated to the members of our favorite Irish rock band, their record label, and their attorneys. The music is two U.
