= Thigmotactic (album) =

Studio album by Negativland
- Released: 2008
- Recorded: 2008 at Olympia, Oakland, San Francisco and the Sonoran Desert
- Length: 39:29
- Label: Seeland

Negativland chronology
No Business (2005)	Thigmotactic (2008)	It's All in Your Head (2014)

Professional ratings
Review scores
Source	Rating
Alternative Press	2.5/5 stars
Tiny Mix Tapes	2.5/5 stars
The A.V. Club	C+

Thigmotactic is the eleventh album by sound collage group Negativland. Unlike previous efforts by the band, it is primarily the expression of one member, Mark Hosler, though other members contributed, as did Thomas Dimuzio. Hosler created the bulk of its audio content as well as the visual collages and assemblages of found objects that are pictured in the liner notes. It is also notable as the band's "first entirely song-based project" and features fifteen songs and two instrumental pieces.

The title Thigmotactic refers to thigmotaxis, an instinctive reflex in response to physical touch, as mentioned in a passage from Ann Zwinger's The Mysterious Lands about a desert lizard with this property. These sentences are excerpted on the inside of the CD cover.

== Track listing ==
1. "Richard Nixon Died Today" – 2:24
2. "Lying on the Grass" - 2:03
3. "Extra Sharp Pencils" - 2:31
4. "It's Not a Critique" - 1:02
5. "Basketball Plant" - 2:46
6. "Two Light Bulbs Flickering" - 1:35
7. "By Truck" - 1:19
8. "Jack Pastrami (Flower Bum)" - 2:41
9. "Influential You" - 2:22
10. "Virginia's Trip" - 2:26
11. "Steak on a Whim" - 3:13
12. "Pork in the Store" - 3:14
13. "Perfect Little Cookies" - 1:55
14. "Kind of Grumpy" - 1:59
15. "Your Skin is Gelatin" - 2:35
16. "Omnipotent Struggle" - 2:46
17. "Rancho Pancho" - 2:28
