= Fair Use: The Story of the Letter U and the Numeral 2 =

Studio album by Negativland
- Released: November 1995
- Recorded: Summer 1992–fall 1994
- Genres: Experimental, plunderphonics
- Length: 1:12:22
- Label: Seeland (Seeland 013)
- Producer: Negativland

Negativland chronology
| Free (1993) | Fair Use: The Story of the Letter U and the Numeral 2 (1995) | Truth in Advertising (1997) |

Professional ratings
Review scores
| Source | Rating |
|---|---|
| Allmusic | 4.5/5 stars |

Fair Use: The Story of the Letter U and the Numeral 2 is a 270-page book and ten track CD released in 1995 by Negativland detailing their lawsuits with U2's record label Island Records for their EP U2, including many legal documents and correspondences.

This book includes the text from the original magazine The Letter U and the Numeral 2 which caused Negativland's record label SST Records to sue Negativland for publishing financial information on SST and the story of how they were being treated by SST.

== Track listing ==
1. "Part One: Snuggles" – 2:46
2. "Part Two: Keep Your Evenings Free" – 4:20
3. "Part Three: Please Don't Sue Us" – 4:01
4. "Part Four: Gimme The Mermaid" – 4:30
5. "Part Five: It Ain't Legit" – 4:29
6. "Part Six: You Must Respect Copyright" – 2:30
7. "Part Seven: How Long Have You Been Waiting For U2?" – 7:48
8. "Part Eight: A Nickel Per Fish Sandwich" – 8:00
9. "Part Nine: Only a Sample" – 8:02
10. "Crosley Bendix Discusses the U.S. Copyright Act" – 25:56

== Samples ==
Sources appearing on "Dead Dog Records":

ABC, NBC, CBS, CBC, PBS, NPR, FOX, ABS, Wiseguy, Casey Kasem, A Real Dog, the Shangri-La's, Usha Uthup, Wild Bill Hickok, Jingles P. Jones, Elizabeth Claire Prophet, David Ross, Big Daddy, the Edge, XTC, Captain Beefheart, the Chipmunks, Slim Whitman, Holger Hiller, Lightnin' Hopkins, Chumbawamba, Muddy Waters, the Rolling Stones, James Gabbert, Ray Rienhardt, Scott Beach, Led Zeppelin, Jim Bohannon, Perry & Kingsley, Johann Strauss, Little Roger and the Goosebumps, Tom Waits, Marilyn Quayle, David Byrne, the Code, The Little Mermaid, Dean Martin, Danny O'Day and Farfel, Black Flag, the Weatherman, Byram Abbott, James Snothed, Marky Mark and the Funky Bunch, Jeff Koons, the History of Radio, Nina Totenberg, Linda Wortheimer, 2 Live Crew, Roy Orbison, Alan M. Turk, Perez Prado, Brian Robertson, the Jerky Boys, Dan Lynch, Ewan Hughes, Merle Travis, U2, Art Rogers, the Pretenders, Stupidland, TM Productions, Rush Limbaugh, MTV Music Video Awards, B.P. Fallon, Zoo Radio Transmit, De La Soul, Flo and Eddie, Mike Oldfield, Zoo T.V., Crime Photographer, Radioactive Goldfish, Bob Basanich, Tibetan Monks, Bono, Taco Bell, Dana Carvey, Spy Plane Sound Effects Record, Larry King, the Evolution Control Committee, Mark Hamill, Batman, George David Weis, Alan Dershowitz, Bernard Herrmann, Charles Ferris, Penguin Cafe Orchestra, Sammy Davis Jr., Jerry Spence, Brian Eno, Bing Crosby, Wendy Carlos, the Andrews Sisters, Dick Haymes, Ethel Merman, Xerox Technology and many original sounds made and played by Negativland.

== See also ==
- These Guys Are from England and Who Gives a Shit
- The Letter U and the Numeral 2
