= James Boyle (legal scholar) =

Scottish legal academic

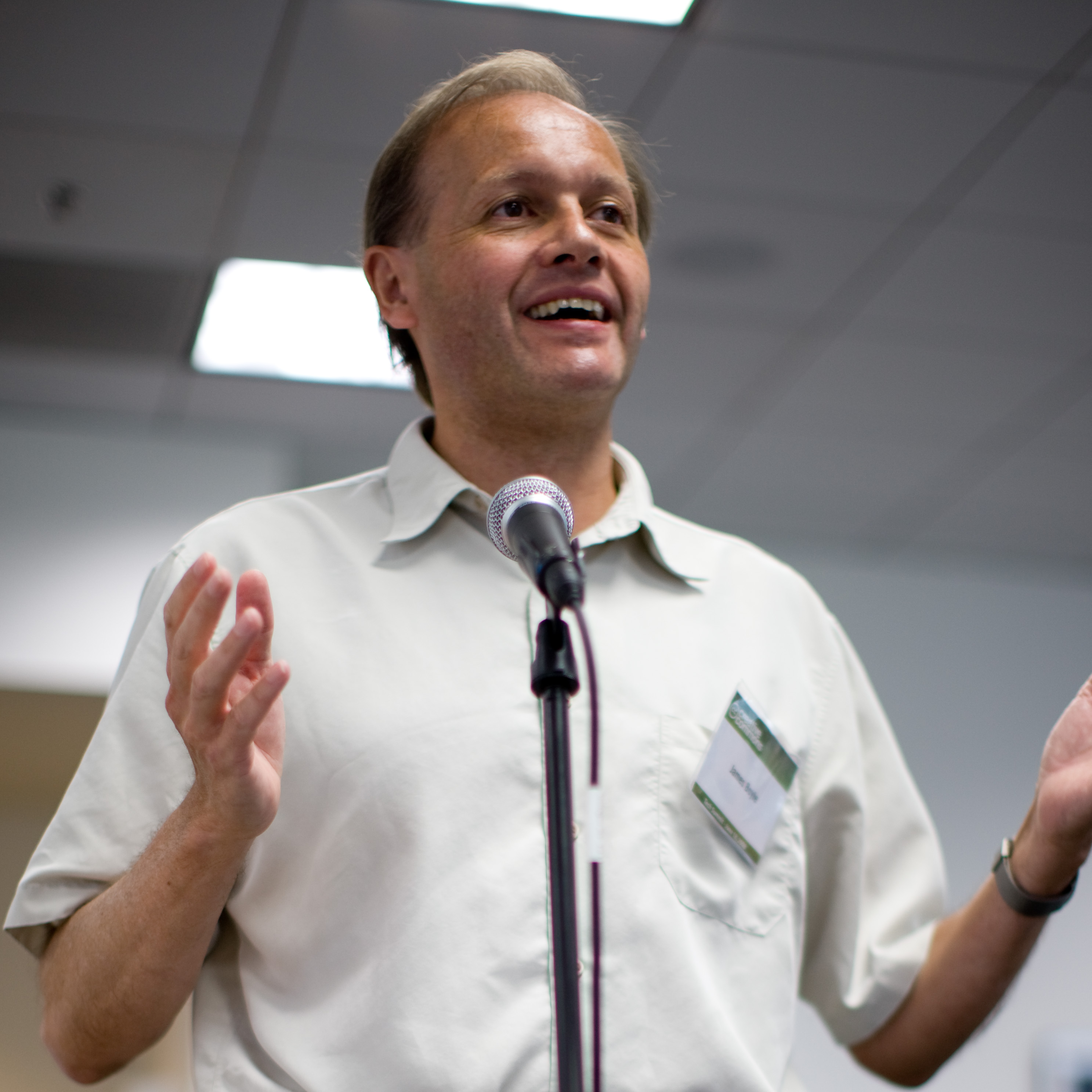
- Boyle in 2008
- Born: 1959 (age 65); Scotland
- Citizenship: United Kingdom
- Education: University of Glasgow; Harvard University
- Occupations: Legal academic and author
- Employer: Duke University School of Law
- Known for: Creative Commons
- Notable work: Shamans, Software and Spleens; Bound by Law?; The Public Domain; Theft: A History of Music
- Title: William Neal Reynolds Professor of Law
- Awards: Duke Bar Association Distinguished Teaching Award
- Website: james-boyle.com; thepublicdomain.org

James Boyle (born 1959) is a Scottish intellectual property scholar. He is the William Neal Reynolds Professor of Law and co-founder of the Center for the Study of the Public Domain at Duke University School of Law in Durham, North Carolina. He is most prominently known for advocating looser copyright policies in the United States and worldwide.

== Teaching and activism ==
Boyle graduated from the University of Glasgow in 1980 and subsequently studied at Harvard Law School where he earned both his LL.M (1981) and S.J.D. (1986). He joined Duke University School of Law in July 2000. Prior to Duke, Boyle previously taught at American University, Yale, Harvard, Boston University, and the University of Pennsylvania Law School.

In 2002, he was one of the founding board members of Creative Commons, and held the position of Chairman of the Board in 2009, after which he stepped down. He also co-founded Science Commons, which aims to expand the Creative Commons mission into the realm of scientific and technical data, and ccLearn, a division of Creative Commons aimed at facilitating access to open education resources.

In 2006, he earned the Duke Bar Association Distinguished Teaching Award.

Courses he has taught include "Intellectual Property", "The Constitution in Cyberspace", "Law and Literature", "Jurisprudence", and "Torts".

== Written works ==
He is the author of The Line: AI & The Future of Personhood, Shamans, Software and Spleens: Law and Construction of the Information Society as well as a novel published under a Creative Commons license, The Shakespeare Chronicles.

Boyle is also the author of two graphic novels Bound by Law and Theft: A History of Music

In his work on intellectual property, The Public Domain: Enclosing the Commons of the Mind (2008), Boyle argues that the current system of copyright protections fails to fulfill the original intent of copyright: rewarding and encouraging creativity. It was also published under a non-commercial CC BY-NC-SA Creative Commons license.

He also wrote "The Second Enclosure Movement and the Construction of the Public Domain," a 2003 article in which he compared the expansion of intellectual property rights to the historical enclosure of commonly held land and argued for greater recognition of the importance of the public domain.

Boyle also contributed a column to the Financial Times New Technology Policy Forum.

In 2011, Boyle was one of five experts consulted for the Hargreaves Review of Intellectual Property and Growth, a comprehensive analysis of the United Kingdom's intellectual property system that made suggestions for data-driven reform of the system.

== Awards ==
He has been the recipient of multiple awards including the Pioneer Award, Duke Bar Association Distinguished Teaching Award, and the World Technology Network Award.

Donald McGannon Award (communications) and the American Society of Information Science and Technology Award's book of the year.

== Selected publications ==
- Shamans, Software and Spleens: Law and Construction of the Information Society, Harvard University Press 1997, ISBN 978-0-674-80522-4
- The Public Domain (ed), Winter/Spring 2003 edition of Law and Contemporary Problems (vol 66, ##1–2), Duke University School of Law
- Bound by Law? Tales from the Public Domain , Duke University Center for the Study of the Public Domain 2006, ISBN 978-0-9741553-1-9
- Cultural Environmentalism @ 10 (ed, with Lawrence Lessig), Spring 2007 edition of Law and Contemporary Problems (vol 70, #2), Duke University School of Law
  - Cultural Environmentalism and Beyond
- The Shakespeare Chronicles: A Novel, Lulu Press 2006, ISBN 978-1-4303-0768-6
- Public Domain: Enclosing the Commons of the Mind, Yale University Press 2008, ISBN 978-0-300-13740-8
- Theft: A History of Music, CreateSpace Independent Publishing Platform 2017, ISBN 978-1535543675
- The Unperson Of 2023
- The Line: AI & The Future of Personhood, MIT Press 2024, ISBN 978-0262049160
