= Keith Aoki =

American law professor

- Born: 1955
- Died: April 26, 2011 (aged 55–56)
- Education: UC Davis School of Law and University of Oregon School of Law
- Occupations: Law professor and author
- Notable work: Bound by Law? Tales from the Public Domain; Theft: A History of Music
- Style: Comic book

Keith Aoki (1955 – April 26, 2011) was an American law professor who served on the faculty of University of California, Davis School of Law and the University of Oregon School of Law. He co-authored the nonfiction graphic novels Bound by Law? Tales from the Public Domain, which explains copyright law and the doctrine of fair use, and he was a co-author of Theft: A History of Music, both in collaboration with the Center for the Study of the Public Domain at the Duke University School of Law. His scholarship covered topics such as intellectual property, racial equality, and immigration reform. His work was covered in memorial tributes in the law reviews where he had taught and by other colleagues.

== Education and law career ==
Aoki studied art at Wayne State University and Hunter College. Changing fields to law he studied at Harvard Law School and the University of Wisconsin Law School.

Aoki may have been responsible for coining the word "paracopyright" in a 1997 letter of concern about the WIPO Performances and Phonograms Treaty.

He wrote extensively about racial issues and immigration. In his personal life, Aoki's father was affected by the Japanese American internment: during World War II, his "father was interned at the Gila River camp in Arizona" during World War II.

== Art ==
Aoki's art has been shown in retrospectives about Detroit and its artists such as the "Another Look at Detroit" exhibit shown in Chelsea, New York City and the "Subverting Modernism: Cass Corridor Revisited 1966-1980"

Wayne State University where he was a student holds some of his work, which has been showcased in "Up from the streets: Detroit art from the Duffy warehouse collection"

== Prominent works ==
- Seed Wars: Controversies And Cases On Plant Genetic Resources And Intellectual Property, by Keith Aoki. NC: Durham: Carolina Academic Press, 2008. 280pp. ISBN 9781594600500
- Race, Space, and Place
- (In)visible Cities: Three Local Government Models and Immigration Regulation (co-authored, 2008)
- Is Chan Still Missing? An Essay About the Film Snow Falling on Cedars and Representations of Asian Americans in U.S. Films (2001)

== Bibliography ==
- Loss of a Legend by David Pluviose, Diverse Issues in Higher Education, June 9, 2011.
