= Christianity Is Stupid =

Song by Negativland

from the album Escape from Noise
- Released: 1987
- Genre: Experimental music
- Length: 3:54
- Label: SST Records
- Songwriters: Mark Hosler; Don Joyce; Chris Grigg; David Wills; Richard Lyons

"Christianity Is Stupid" is a song from Negativland's 1987 concept album, Escape from Noise.

== Background ==
In the song, Negativland rearranges words and phrases to form a different meaning. They sampled phrases from a sermon by Estus Pirkle (from his 1968 LP, If Footmen Tire You, What Will Horses Do?, itself later adapted into a film of the same name). Pirkle's narrative included an imagined visit to the US under Communism where public loudspeakers constantly proclaim "Christianity is stupid! Communism is good! Give up!" These phrases were altered and mixed with appropriately march-like heavy metal music and various other sound effects.

In 2004, the song was made into a video entitled "The Mashin' of the Christ" that sampled many Jesus Christ-topic films and footage from Marxist-Leninist countries.

== Hoax press release ==
Negativland issued a press release saying that the song "Christianity Is Stupid" had played a role in the David Brom murders. The press release implied that Brom had listened to Negativland's song "Christianity Is Stupid" before the fatal quarrel with his religious parents. The group claimed they were "advised by Federal Official Dick Jordan not to leave town pending an investigation into the Brom murders". Brom, 16 at the time, had killed his family with an axe. Negativland's press release was picked up by San Francisco Bay Area media, including local CBS News affiliate KPIX. Negativland recorded much of the news about their supposed influence on Brom, and in 1989 worked this material into another album called Helter Stupid.

In reality, there was no official named "Dick Jordan", and Brom did not possess any Negativland music. Pundits and journalists reporting on the press generally expressed skepticism, with the exception of local news station KPIX. Negativland refused further comment, supposedly on the advice of their attorney "Hal Stakke", another fictional person invented by the band. The resulting media coverage is lampooned in the title track of their 1989 album, Helter Stupid, whose insert also includes background information behind the band's prank.

Media coverage of the hoax in subsequent years has tended to amplify its effectiveness, e.g. claiming that "With stunning ease, the story marched its way up the media ranks, culminating in high-profile lead newscasts on San Francisco prime-time TV, not to mention a lengthy article in the Village Voice". In fact, KPIX evening news was not prime time and the two paragraph piece in the Village Voice reporting on the band's claim noted "their vagueness makes one ponder if this is just publicity."

== See also ==
- Ron Ormond
- Plunderphonics
