= Over the Edge (radio program) =

- Genre: Sound collage
- Running time: 3 hours
- Country of origin: United States
- Home station: KPFA
- Hosted by: Jon Leidecker ("Wobbly") & Robert Cole ("KrOB")
- Created by: Don Joyce
- Recording studio: Berkeley, California
- Original release: June 1981
- Website: www.negativland.com/ote/ (official); kpfa.org/program/over-the-edge/
- Podcast: kpfa.org/program/over-the-edge/feed/ and negativland.com/ote_files/ (summer 2015-present)

Over the Edge (or OTE) is a sound collage radio program hosted and produced in the United States by Jon Leidecker ("Wobbly") and Robert Cole ("KrOB"), who took over in 2015 after the death of longtime host Don Joyce.

Leidecker, like Joyce, is a member of the pioneering sound collage band Negativland, other members of which have frequently appeared on the show. A series of Over the Edge episodes have been released under the Negativland name, first on cassette and later CD. Critic Ned Raggett describes Over the Edge as "a merry trip into an alternate world," while critic Stephen Cramer describes Over the Edge as "the longest-running block of free-form radio in the history of radio ... essentially live performance art."

Founded in 1981, OTE is broadcast live on KPFA in Berkeley, California, every second, third, and fourth Thursday night/Friday morning from midnight to 3 a.m. On the rare occasion of a month with a fifth Thursday OTE runs an additional two hours, from midnight to 5 a.m. The show is also available online, streamed live from KPFA.org (which podcasts the show), or from Negativland.com, where many older episodes are available as well. As of July 2021, approximately 1300 episodes are stored at the Internet Archive. It is the group's plan to digitize and archive every episode ever made.

== History ==
Negativland members—often just Joyce—have broadcast OTE since June 1981. OTE began as a rather conventional music show, though Joyce gradually experimented with the format, due to his disapproval of what he saw as radio's primary function (encouraging listeners to buy music recordings). The show was originally on Sundays at midnight, following Music from the Hearts of Space. It changed time slots a few times, but now broadcasts in the Thursday/Friday midnight to 3 a.m. slot. Due to various obligations on the part of the host(s) or the KPFA DJs on before and after him, the show is sometimes not aired at all, or is sometimes much longer (up to five hours), or is hosted by friends of Negativland such as the hosts of the Puzzling Evidence show which usually airs after OTE. Usually these kinds of scheduling changes are announced the week previous, or in the closing minutes of the previous show.

== Format ==
Joyce declared that with OTE, he and his collaborators "create 'direct-reference' collages, manipulating and mixing both found and original sounds to produce a new kind of audio animal. OTE is always concerned with recycling existing cultural elements to some new, unintended effect."

Joyce used sound collage techniques, weaving many sources together throughout the program to create a "conversational" form of audio presentation. Sources might include recordings of other radio programs (including old time radio shows, commercials, talk shows, or news programs), portions of documentary films, songs and more, all typically—but not always—related to a pre-selected theme.

Joyce usually played a "bed" of unobtrusive background music, and adds reverberation or other special effects to sound sources. He also employed the "Booper", a circuit-bending oscillator created by David Wills ("The Weatherman"), to create electronic and synthesized tones that he incorporates into the show.

OTE's theme music is the track "12 O'Clock (in two parts)" from Heaven and Hell (1975), by Vangelis. Most of the time, this song begins each show, though in some cases other sounds may play over it, and the song may be slowed down or sped up, depending on the show's theme. About two-thirds of the way through the song during a natural pause in the music, the song stops and Joyce played a teaser, which indicates a topic or theme he would explore for the episode.

Following the theme music, Joyce would usually announce the theme of the show, and when appropriate, say a few words that relate to previous or upcoming events. Usually at the top of the hour Joyce performed a station identification for KPFA, and near the end of the show made a similar closing announcement. At the very end of each episode Joyce played a recording of a woman's voice reading a statement attributed to photographer Man Ray: "To create is divine. To reproduce is human. Man Ray."

Throughout most shows, regardless of content, Joyce played spots that identified the show as part of the Universal Media Netweb. This is part of an ongoing Joyce-concocted plot and overarching narrative connecting the majority of Over the Edge broadcasts, featuring a cast of recurring characters and situations.

Occasionally, Over the Edge will subvert or toy with established OTE formats when it suits the theme of the show. Joyce or his guests played various UMN characters, and would sometimes even skip the theme music and other show conventions, to better create the feel and sound of another kind of show. The best-known example might be The California Superstation, released as Over the Edge Vol. 4: Dick Vaughn's Moribund Music of the '70s. Negativland member Richard Lyons played his recurring character, the Dick Clark-like '70s corporate radio mogul Dick Vaughn. The premise of the episode was that KPFA's format had officially changed to a '70s oldies theme. It was so smoothly done that a few fans of the show actually believed it and became quite confused, which is ironic given that the collage nature of the show tends to confuse the average radio listener.

== Receptacle programming ==
The audience phone participation ("Receptacle Programming") is another element of the format: listeners are encouraged to call in, and are placed on-air, sometimes two or three at a time, with no prior screening. Listeners can then play their own recordings for OTE, offer commentary or non-sequiturs, or, less often, converse with Joyce. People are allowed to remain on the air as long as Joyce judges their contributions valuable, from a few seconds to several minutes or more. The highly improvisational content and late hour of the broadcast attract a variety of colorful callers.

According to Joyce, Receptacle Programming is, ideally, a collaboration:

Receptacle programming is there to deposit ideas and sounds from the real, live, simultaneous life outside our broadcast studio. Real-time participation allows a direct interaction with our mix as it is happening. Thus, musicians can join in with an over-the phone instrument and follow our live beat or provide a responsive bed for our elements. This, as we like to say, is best accomplished by listening to the show on stereo headphones tuned to KPFA when you call, and holding the telephone like a microphone. Then the caller is "in" the mix, hearing his or her own real-time sounds being broadcast right along with our mix in headphone stereo. Some callers have their own mixers which they connect to their phones and send in their own rather elaborate mixes of music and tapes with their own effects added.

There are only two rules for callers: (1) When the phone stops ringing, you're on the air; (2) Don't say "Hello."

Many fans and regular callers of the show have home-brewed their own electronic devices to aid in sending sound over the phone.

Leidecker has continued to present the show using Joyce's original format, including receptacle programming. He asks that callers try to use Skype and avoid calling in on their cellphones, for better sound quality.

== Topics ==
Joyce typically followed one theme for an entire program. Topics vary wildly, from motion pictures, to various music and copyright issues and the CIA; one episode each was devoted to Ken Nordine and to radio comedy team Bob and Ray.

Usually only a few times a year, Joyce did an episode in a series called "Another UFO". Each episode examines one facet of the unidentified flying object phenomenon, such as alien abduction, cattle mutilation, or the Roswell UFO incident. These episodes are a fan favorite, and a subject that Joyce himself is continually fascinated with.

In 2006 Joyce began two on-going series: "How Radio Isn't Done" (about pirate radio and other broadcasting renegades and/or bloopers), and "How Radio Was Done" (about the history of radio as a cultural phenomenon, with recorded samplings from hundreds of thousands of airchecks).

== Characters and story ==
Over the Edge often uses personas and characters, created by Joyce and his cohorts, to give the show a textual depth and continuity over time. The show purports to be part of the "Universal Media Netweb," a broadcasting entity that offers any number of shows, and specializes in Receptacle Programming. The UMN employs a number of people, including Joyce, and is responsible for the UMN spots that Joyce plays throughout his shows. While new developments in this storyline ebbed and flowed as Joyce's interests shifted and change over time, there are recurring characters that crop up fairly often.

=== C. Elliot Friday ===
UMN is supposedly funded by a wealthy recluse, C. Elliot Friday, who lives in a secret retreat on Howland Island, and emerges every four years to run for President on the Universal Party ticket. He is an inventor who has devised various gadgets marketed as "Fridatronics", including the Cubulax and the new DIECORP technology designed to make all music available to everyone absolutely free. He also came up with nutritional supplements like the "Mertz" pill ("Mertz makes up your mind!")

=== Crosley Bendix ===
Crosley Bendix was a radio personality (played by Joyce) for a series of commentaries. Bendix was touted as the Cultural Reviewer and Director of Stylistic Premonitions for UMN, and typically greeted listeners with a cheery "Good hello!" Bendix introduced listeners to "squant", the fictitious "fourth primary color", which was also the only primary color to have its own unique scent.

Among Joyce's other characters were Dr. Oslo Norway, Dean of Psychiatric Broadcasting for UMN and Chairman of One World Advertising; local TV news anchor Leland Googleburger; Wang Tool, a lugubrious computerized voice stationed on the moon; and Izzy Isn't, who "hosted" the show for the last few years of Joyce's life. Leidecker continues this role-playing practice by having his character Mike Worm, aspiring President of General Injectables and Signals, "host" the show or make announcements.

== Discography with Negativland ==
Since the 1980s, Over the Edge has also been an outlet for Negativland's creativity. The group participated in many of the shows, a few of which have been released as edited-down cassettes and CDs:

- Over the Edge Vol. 1: JAMCON'84 (1985)
- Over the Edge Vol. 1½: The Starting Line with Dick Goodbody (1995, partial reissue)
- Over the Edge Vol. 2: Pastor Dick: Muriel's Purse Fund (1990)
- Over the Edge Vol. 3: The Weatherman's Dumb Stupid Come-Out Line (1990)
- Over the Edge Vol. 4: Dick Vaughn's Moribund Music of the '70s (2001, expanded reissue)
- Over the Edge Vol. 5: Crosley Bendix Radio Reviews (1993)
- Over the Edge Vol. 6: The Willsaphone Stupid Show (1994)
- Over the Edge Vol. 7: Time Zones Exchange Project (1994)
- Over the Edge Vol. 8: Sex Dirt (1995)
- It's All in Your Head FM: Over the Edge Live on Stage (2006)
- The Chopping Channel (2016) This release featured some of Joyce's last work, and included a small bag of Joyce's cremated ashes.

== Beyond the edge ==
Don Joyce died of heart failure on July 22, 2015. After a tribute special, Over the Edge continued with fellow Negativlander Jon Leidecker ("Wobbly") and KPFA's Robert Cole ("KrOB") at the helm. Leidecker plays the best of Joyce's work, including surprises from Don's cache of tapes discovered after his death, plus electronic and experimental music and new sound collage from Leidecker, Hosler and the rest of the group. Two shows per month are hosted by KrOB, who is developing his own following. Leidecker wanted to change the name of the show to reflect its evolution, and called it Over The Edge Presents until April 24, 2020, when it reverted to its original title.

Joyce's assistants had been working for several years on digitizing all the Over the Edge tapes and arranged to store them on the Internet Archive for free download. Uploads of this material began in late October 2015, and almost 1300 shows are now available. The goal is to collect tapes of every show ever done, and possibly to archive Leidecker's broadcasts as well. At present, these can be heard and downloaded at Over the Edge Radio and more recent shows (from 2015 to 2017, many Leidecker's and Cole's) at Index of OTE Files. (Normally found at Negativland's website, a recent redesign omitted the Index page for their archived shows.) The show is also archived in low-resolution audio format at KPFA: the most recent episodes can be heard and downloaded there.

Several shows inspired by Over the Edge can be heard on independent and community stations across the country. KMUZ's Mid-Valley Mutations creator Austin Rich specifically cites Negativland and Over the Edge as inspiration for his own work: "This band and their radio show have been a focal point for the kind of work I want to create, and has guided my attitudes toward culture and art for my entire adult life."

Following Joyce's death, Filmmaker Ryan Worsley directed an 80-minute documentary, How Radio Isn't Done, featuring surviving members of Negativland as well as archival footage of Joyce himself.
