= U2 (EP) =

Negativland EP

EP by Negativland
- Released: 1991
- Recorded: 1989–91
- Genre: Sound collage, experimental
- Length: 13:01
- Label: SST (272), Seeland
- Producer: Negativland

Negativland chronology
Helter Stupid (1989)	U2 (1991)	Guns (1992)

Professional ratings
Review scores
Source	Rating
AllMusic	4/5 stars

U2 is a withdrawn EP by Negativland, released on SST Records in 1991. The EP and the band gained notoriety when lawyers representing Island Records sued Negativland over the EP's unauthorized sampling of the U2 song "I Still Haven't Found What I'm Looking For" and misleading artwork. The EP's two tracks and related material were later collected on the compilation These Guys Are from England and Who Gives a Shit.

== History ==
The two tracks on U2 are parodies of U2's "I Still Haven't Found What I'm Looking For" which sample the original recording and a bootleg tape of radio DJ Casey Kasem's outtakes, including his evaluation of U2: "These guys are from England [sic] and who gives a shit?"

U2's label Island Records sued Negativland following the release of the EP, claiming that the music and artwork constituted copyright infringement. Island Records also claimed that the single was an attempt to deliberately confuse U2 fans, then awaiting the impending release of Achtung Baby.

After U2 was withdrawn and deleted, it was replaced with the EP Guns. The incident would be chronicled in the magazine/CD release The Letter U and the Numeral 2 (later re-released in expanded form as Fair Use: The Story of the Letter U and the Numeral 2).

== Track listing ==
1. "I Still Haven't Found What I'm Looking For" (1991 A Capella Mix) – 7:15
2. "I Still Haven't Found What I'm Looking For" (Special Edit Radio Mix) – 5:46

== Personnel ==
- Mark Hosler - tapes, electronics, rhythms, Booper, clarinet, organ, viola, loops, guitar, etc.
- Richard Lyons - tapes, electronics, rhythms, Booper, clarinet, organ, viola, loops, guitar, etc.
- David Wills - synthesizer, voice, tape
- Peter Dayton - guitars, viola
- W. M. Kennedy - guitar
