= Kyle Bruckmann =

American oboist

- Born: 1971 (age 54–55)
- Origin: San Francisco, California
- Genres: Improvisational
- Occupation: Oboist/Composer
- Instrument: Oboe
- Years active: 1996 - present
- Labels: Porter Records, 482 Music, New World Records
- Website: www.kylebruckmann.com

Kyle Bruckmann (born 1971) is an American composer and oboist based in San Francisco, California.

Getting his musical start playing in industrial and hardcore bands, Bruckmann then studied oboe with Robert Atherholt at Rice University. He earned his master's degree at the University of Michigan (MM 1996) under Harry Sargous and contemporary improvisor Ed Sarath.

His musical aesthetic varies widely, from traditional Western classical to free jazz, electronic music and post-punk rock. and he cites Charlemagne Palestine as an influence.

His work has been recorded by the labels Porter Records, 482 Music, and New World Records, among others.

As of April 2022, he is the Assistant Professor of Practice in Oboe and Contemporary Music at the University of Pacific Conservatory of Music.
