= Wobbly (musician) =

American musician

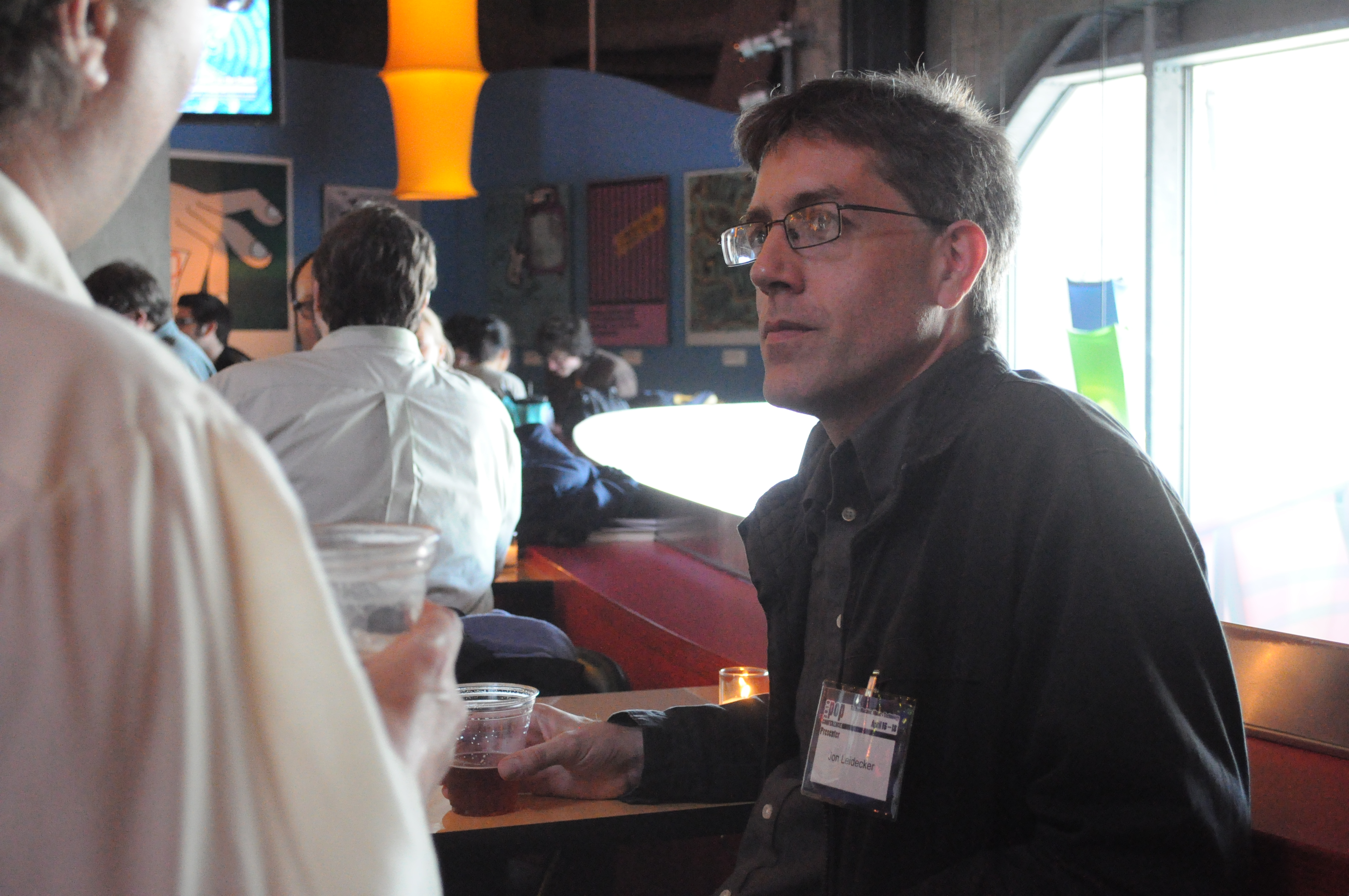
- Wobbly (a.k.a. Jon Leidecker) in 2010

Background information
- Born: Jonathan Henning Leidecker; 1970 (age 55–56)
- Genres: Experimental, electronic
- Occupations: Composer, musician
- Instrument: Keyboards
- Years active: 1990–present
- Formerly of: Negativland; Splendor Generator
- Website: www.detritus.net/wobbly/

Wobbly is the moniker of Jonathan Henning Leidecker (born 1970), an American musician/composer of experimental electronic music based in San Francisco.

== Biography ==
He has released works on Tigerbeat6, Illegal Art, Alku, Phthalo, and others. He has been producing music since 1987 and ongoing studio and live projects involve collaborations with People Like Us, Thomas Dimuzio, Kevin Blechdom, Tim Perkis, Matmos, The Weatherman of Negativland, and Dieter Moebius & Tim Story. He is also a member of the Chopping Channel and Sagan.

In 2002, Leidecker was responsible for the first montage and final cleanup of the Keep the Dog album, That House We Lived In (2003).

In 2008, Leidecker worked on the podcast 'Variations' for the Museum of Contemporary Art in Barcelona. It is an overview of the history of collage and the practice of 'sampling' through 20th century music.

In 2011, Leidecker joined the multimedia collective Negativland. With Negativland's Mark Hosler and Peter Conheim along with Doug Wellman, Leidecker produced "There Is No Don", a live tribute to the late Don Joyce and his work, on July 23, 2015. Jon continues to produce and host Don's Over the Edge weekly radio program.

In 2015, he joined Splendor Generator with Bill Thibault, Tim Perkis and Xopher Davidson (of ANTIMATTER).

== Discography ==
Date	Title	Artist(s)	Type and label	Notes
2000	Campfire Special on KZSU	Wobbly, People Like Us, The Jet Black Hair People	online	
2002	Wild Why	Wobbly	CD, Tigerbeat6	
2002	There Goes Nothing	Wobbly, People Like Us	CD, Tigerbeat6	
2002	Live at Black Box	Wobbly, People Like Us	CD, Tigerbeat6	
2002	Live At ATA, 12 October 2002	Wobbly, People Like Us	CD, Tigerbeat6	
2002	Baby Makes Three 2 on Over The Edge, KPFA	Wobbly, People Like Us, Don Joyce	online	
2003	Wide Open Spaces	Wobbly, People Like Us, Matmos	CD, Tigerbeat6	
2010	Simultaneous Quodlibet	Wobbly, Lesser, Matmos	CD, Important Records	
2010	Music for the Fire	Wobbly, People Like Us	CD, Illegal Art	
2014	Snowghost Pieces	Wobbly, Moebius, Story	CD, Bureau B	
2017	Familiar	Wobbly, Moebius, Story	LP/CD, Bureau B	
