= Estus Pirkle =

American Baptist minister (1930–2005)

- Born: Estus Washington Pirkle; March 12, 1930; Vienna, Georgia, U.S.
- Died: March 3, 2005 (aged 74); Tupelo, Mississippi, U.S.
- Resting place: Myrtle, Mississippi, U.S.
- Occupation: Preacher
- Spouse: Annie Gregory (m. 1955)
- Children: 2 (including Greg Pirkle)

Estus Washington Pirkle (March 12, 1930 – March 3, 2005) was an American Baptist minister, evangelist, and filmmaker.

== Early life ==
Estus Washington Pirkle was born in Vienna, Georgia on March 12, 1930. He was one of eleven children to Grover Washington Pirkle and Bessie Nora Jones. He grew up primarily in Sycamore, Georgia. He graduated from Norman Junior College and attended Mercer University in Macon and Southwestern Baptist Theological Seminary in Fort Worth, Texas. Pirkle became a pastor travelling through the southern United States, including his home state of Georgia, Texas, Louisiana and Kentucky. He met his wife Ann in Athens, Texas. Pirkle served at Locust Grove Baptist Church in New Albany, Mississippi for 36 years.

Pirkle died on March 3, 2005, in Tupelo, Mississippi, nine days before his 75th birthday.

== Film work ==
In addition to his preaching, Pirkle was known for creating and starring in his own Christian films as well as writing numerous books. His films were directed by Ron Ormond (known for his previous works on exploitation films like 1953's Mesa of Lost Women) and produced by the Ormond Organization of Nashville, Tennessee. The first of these films was the Christian horror film If Footmen Tire You, What Will Horses Do? from 1971.

The Burning Hell is a 1974 exploitation horror film created by Pirkle (directed by Ormond) as his interpretation of what the Bible has to say about hell. Both Footmen and The Burning Hell are widely notorious for their poor production values, depiction of graphic and brutal violence and hypocritical nature. The 1977 companion movie The Believer's Heaven gives Pirkle's interpretation of what the Bible has to say about heaven. Unlike its predecessors, The Believer's Heaven was not successful at all, due it being much tamer in its gratuitous violence and gore; nevertheless, all three films were critically panned.

== Legacy ==
Pirkle's preaching was sampled by Negativland for the song "Christianity Is Stupid". The Believer's Heaven was sampled by Insane Clown Posse on their 1997 album The Great Milenko.

Danish filmmaker Nicolas Winding Refn restored both The Burning Hell and The Believer's Heaven each for film festival showings and streaming.

== Bibliography ==
- (1968) Wintertime, Moffitt Press
- (1969) Preachers in Space, Hiott Press
- (1969) What Are You Living For?, MP Religious Book and Record Co.
- The 1611 King James Bible: a study, The King's Press
- A Ray for God, The Official Biography of Percy Ray, The King's Press

== Filmography ==
- If Footmen Tire You, What Will Horses Do? (1971)
- The Burning Hell (1974)
- The Believer's Heaven (1977)
