= Negativland =

American experimental music group

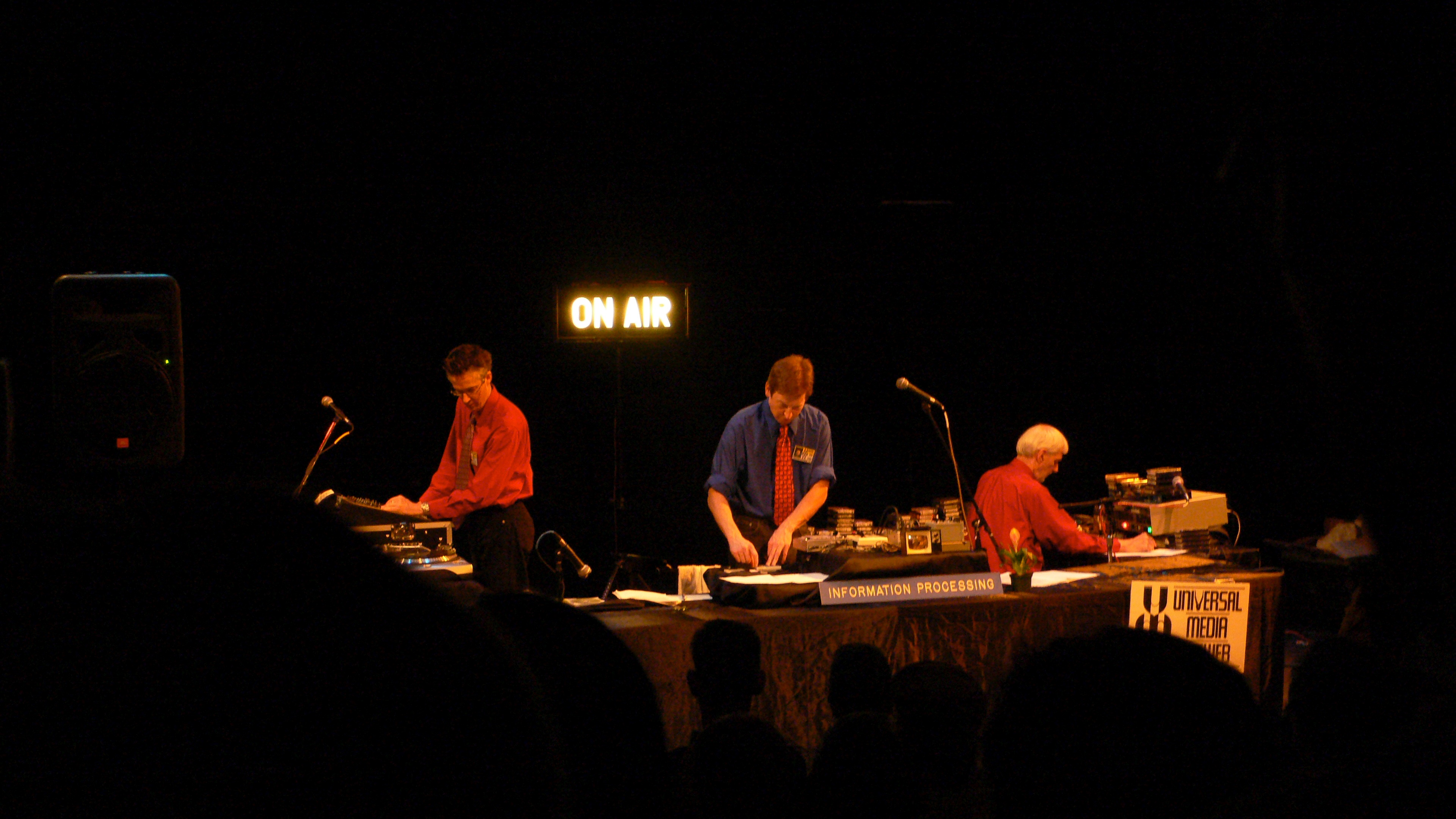
- Negativland performing in 2007

Background information
- Origin: Concord, California, United States
- Genres: Experimental rock; sound collage; industrial; plunderphonics
- Years active: 1979–present
- Labels: Seeland, SST, Revolver/Midheaven Mailorder (distributor)
- Members: Mark Hosler; David Wills (aka "The Weatherman"); Jon Leidecker (aka "Wobbly")
- Past members: Ian Allen; Chris Grigg; Don Joyce; Richard Lyons; Peter Conheim
- Website: negativland.com

Negativland is an American experimental music band formed in Concord, California, in 1979. The core of the band consists of Mark Hosler, David "the Weatherman" Wills, Peter Conheim, and Jon "Wobbly" Leidecker. Negativland has released a number of albums ranging from pure sound collage to more musical expositions. These have mostly been released on their own label, Seeland Records. In the late 1980s and early 1990s, they produced several recordings for SST Records, most notably Escape from Noise, Helter Stupid, and U2. The band was sued by U2's record label, Island Records, over U2, which brought them widespread publicity and notoriety. The band, along with the Church of the SubGenius, were among those given a free website by the University of North Carolina at Chapel Hill in 1994. Negativland coined the term "culture jamming" in 1984. The band took their name from a song by the German krautrock band Neu! from their self-titled debut album, with their record label Seeland Records being named after a track from the band's Neu! '75.

== History ==
=== 1980s ===
Negativland was founded in 1979 in Concord, California, by Mark Hosler and Richard Lyons, who were in high school at the time. The band released its eponymous debut album in 1980. A number of releases followed in the early 1980s, but it was not until after the release by SST Records of their fourth album, Escape from Noise (1987), that Negativland gained wider attention.

Following the unexpected success of the album, Negativland faced pressure from SST to tour, which would most likely lose them money; to prevent this, they made the decision to craft a hoax press release claiming that "Federal Authority Dick Jordan" had asked them not to tour in light of the Escape from Noise track "Christianity Is Stupid" possibly having inspired murderer David Brom. The press release was disseminated and discussed, generally skeptically, in local media and the Village Voice, and KPIX-TV news in San Francisco interviewed the band on the story. The incident became the conceptual foundation for Negativland's next release, Helter Stupid (1989).

=== 1990s ===
In 1991, Negativland released the EP U2, containing two parodies of the U2 song "I Still Haven't Found What I'm Looking For" which featured unauthorized sampling of the original song and excerpts from a bootleg tape of disc jockey Casey Kasem's outtakes. U2's label Island Records quickly sued Negativland, holding that the sampling of U2's music and the EP's cover art (which displayed the title "U2" in much larger type than "Negativland") violated trademark law and was an attempt to deliberately confuse U2 fans.

In June 1992, R. U. Sirius, publisher of the magazine Mondo 2000 and a friend of Negativland, was asked by U2's publicists to interview the Edge. Sirius had Hosler and bandmate Don Joyce conduct the interview on his behalf; they asked the Edge questions regarding U2's use of sampling and his perspective on fair use. Midway through the interview, they revealed their identities as members of Negativland. The Edge stated that U2 themselves were bothered by Island's legal action, which had largely taken place without their knowledge. Island Records had reported to Negativland that U2 never authorized samples of their material, but the Edge denied this, stating that "there's at least six records out there that are direct samples from our stuff." In 1995, Negativland released the book and CD Fair Use: The Story of the Letter U and the Numeral 2, about the legal proceedings surrounding U2. The book ends with a large appendix of essays about fair use and copyright by Negativland and others. The U2 EP (along with other related material) was re-released in 2001 on a quasi-bootleg album entitled These Guys Are from England and Who Gives a Shit (after one of Kasem's outtakes).

SST Records, which had not provided support to Negativland during the Island lawsuit, subsequently sued the band themselves, which led to them parting ways. Label founder Greg Ginn later released the album Negativ(e)land: Live on Tour on SST against the band's wishes.

Negativland were the main subjects of Craig Baldwin's documentary Sonic Outlaws, detailing the use of what they termed "culture jamming." They also made an appearance in the 2009 documentary RiP!: A Remix Manifesto.

In 1993 Negativland toured with Colorado punk/garage musician Little Fyodor. In 1999 Negativland collaborated with Chumbawamba to produce the EP The ABCs of Anarchism, based around the writings of Alexander Berkman and samples of Chumbawamba's "Tubthumping", the Teletubbies theme, and the Sex Pistols' "Anarchy in the UK".

=== 2000s ===
In 2003, members of Negativland contributed their efforts to Creative Commons. In September 2002, Negativland parodied Clear Channel radio stations in an audio track broadcast by pirate radio broadcasters jamming a Seattle Clear Channel station while the National Association of Broadcasters met in the city.

In September 2005, to celebrate the 25th anniversary of the band, Negativland curated an art exhibit in Manhattan's Gigantic Artspace gallery, formerly located at 59 Franklin Street. The exhibit, Negativlandland, included a number of pieces of artwork from and inspired by Negativland recordings, video projection of music videos created by the band and others, and some artwork created specifically for the show, such as an animatronic Abraham Lincoln figure (inspired by the band's "God Bull" from No Business) and a hands-on exhibit featuring the "Booper", a synthesizer built by the band's David "the Weatherman" Wills. The show appeared in Minneapolis on May 12, 2006, at Creative Electric Studios.

=== 2010s ===
Former member Don Joyce long hosted the weekly radio show Over the Edge on KPFA in Berkeley, California. In 2015, following Joyce's death, the show was taken over by Jon "Wobbly" Leidecker (who had joined Negativland in 2011) and Robert Cole. Recordings of some noteworthy episodes of the show have been released by Seeland in its Over the Edge series.

Former band member Ian Allen died on January 17, 2015, at 56 years old due to complications from heart valve surgery. On July 22, 2015, Don Joyce died of heart failure at the age of 71. On April 19, 2016, Richard Lyons died from complications of nodular melanoma at a nursing facility, aged 57. Select copies of the band's 2016 album Over the Edge Vol. 9: The Chopping Channel included a bag containing two grams of Joyce's cremated remains.

In 2019, True False was released.

=== 2020s ===
The album The World Will Decide was released on November 13, 2020.

== Legacy ==
Rivers Cuomo of Weezer wrote a song titled "Negativland" about the band in 1993. The song was eventually released in 2011 on Cuomo's solo album Alone III: The Pinkerton Years.

Artists such as Girl Talk have cited Negativland as an influence. Fatboy Slim sampled a Negativland song that, according to Hosler, itself sampled a Christian children's album from the 1960s in an unauthorized fashion. Vice writer Peter Holslin wrote in 2014: "These days, what Negativland does is pretty much di rigueur [sic] in Internet meme culture—collage, mashups, reappropriation, recontextualization. But these guys were doing this stuff long before the age of YouTube and Tumblr, decades before it was cool."

== Discography ==
=== Studio albums ===
- Negativland (1980)
- Points (1981)
- A Big 10-8 Place (1983)
- Escape from Noise (1987)
- Helter Stupid (1989)
- Free (1993)
- Fair Use: The Story of the Letter U and the Numeral 2 (1995)
- Dispepsi (1997)
- Deathsentences of the Polished and Structurally Weak (2002)
- No Business (2005)
- Thigmotactic (2008)
- It's All in Your Head (2014)
- True False (2019)
- The World Will Decide (2020)
- Speech Free: Recording Music for Film, Radio Internet and Television (2022)

=== Videos ===
- No Other Possibility (1989; re-released in 2008 with A Big 10-8 Place)
- Our Favorite Things (2007)

=== Over the Edge ===
- Over the Edge Vol. 1: JAMCON'84 (1985)
- Over the Edge Vol. 1½: The Starting Line with Dick Goodbody (1985, partial reissue in 1995)
- Over the Edge Vol. 2: Pastor Dick: Muriel's Purse Fund (1989)
- Over the Edge Vol. 3: The Weatherman's Dumb Stupid Come-Out Line (1990)
- Over the Edge Vol. 4: Dick Vaughn's Moribund Music of the '70s (1990, expanded reissue in 2001)
- Over the Edge Vol. 5: Crosley Bendix: The Radio Reviews (1993)
- Over the Edge Vol. 6: The Willsaphone Stupid Show (1994)
- Over the Edge Vol. 7: Time Zones Exchange Project (1994)
- Over the Edge Vol. 8: Sex Dirt (1995)
- Over the Edge Vol. 9: The Chopping Channel (2016)

=== EPs ===
- U2 (1991)
- Guns (1992)
- The Letter U and the Numeral 2 (1992)
- Truth in Advertising (1997)
- Happy Heroes (1998)
- The ABCs of Anarchism (1999) (with Chumbawamba)

=== Live albums ===
- Negativconcertland (1993)
- Negativ(e)land: Live on Tour (1997)
- It's All in Your Head FM (2006)
