= Dispepsi =

Studio album by Negativland
- Released: July 29, 1997
- Recorded: 1996–97
- Genres: Plunderphonics, collage
- Length: 42:43
- Label: Seeland
- Producer: Negativland

Negativland chronology
Truth in Advertising (1997)	Dispepsi (1997)	Happy Heroes (1998)

Professional ratings
Review scores
Source	Rating
AllMusic	4/5 stars
Now	3/5 stars
Pitchfork	4.0/10
Spin	7/10

Dispepsi is the eighth album by the American experimental plunderphonics band Negativland. It was released on July 29, 1997, by Seeland Records, Negativland's record label. It is structured as a statement against the major soft drink companies and contains many samples of advertisements from the industry. Particularly, the collage album focuses on Pepsi adverts.

== History ==
The album was an attack on the highly competitive soft drink companies Coca-Cola and Pepsi. The title is a variation of dyspepsia, which is synonymous with indigestion. The word "Dispepsi" deliberately does not appear anywhere on the album artwork, but a telephone number was set up to provide the proper title. It is scrambled into anagrams including "Pedissip" and "Ideppiss", as the band originally believed they would be sued for trademark infringement if the actual title was shown. Once Pepsi lawyers indicated that they had no intention of suing Negativland, they began referring to it by its actual title. However, on the front artwork (based on the flag of South Korea), the actual album title could be un-scrambled by reading the red letters in order of their decreasing size, starting with the largest, D, and ending with the smallest, I.

Notes on samples include:

"All of the cola commercials that were appropriated, transformed, and reused in this recording attempted to assault us in our homes without permission. Other sources reused include: talk radio, MOMMIE DEAREST, tabloid TV, Pepsi and Shirlie, documentary TV, Bryan Ferry, the news, Ice-T, public service announcements, Asha Bhosle, MC Lyte, The Clio Awards, traditional Burmese music, the O. J. Simpson murder case, motivational marketing tapes by advertising executives."

A music video for "The Greatest Taste Around" incorporates clips of Pepsi ads synchronized with the song.

== Track listing ==
1. "The Smile You Can't Hide" (1:34)
2. "Drink It Up" (3:46)
3. "Why Is This Commercial?" (2:18)
4. "Happy Hero" (5:03)
5. "A Most Successful Formula" (3:30)
6. "The Greatest Taste Around" (2:14)
7. "Hyper Real" (0:54)
8. "All She Called About" (3:23)
9. "I Believe It's L" - Ft. Steve Fisk (6:21)
10. "Humanitarian Effort" (0:32)
11. "Voice Inside My Head" (3:46)
12. "Aluminum or Glass: The Memo" (3:46)
13. "Bite Back" (5:31)

== Credits ==
- Made, played, recorded and mixed by: Negativland
- Keyboards and drum boxing on "I Believe It's L": Steve Fisk
- Dyspeptic designing: Shawn Wolfe
- Tuneless found warbling: Catherine Carter
- Authoritative voice and number crunching: Peter Conheim
- Video jiggling: Harold Boihem
- Commercial contributions: Arjan Schutte and John Skelton
- Image looting: Craig Baldwin
- Drum butchering: Pat Maley
- Digital master assembling: Matt Spiro and James LeBrecht
- Free legal advising from our team of lawyer-operated salad shooters: Keith Aoki, James Boyle, Kohel Haver, Alan Korn, Jeffery Selman and Peter Shaver
- Unlimited access to their vast archives: One World Advertising
