= David Brom =

American mass murderer

- Born: David Francis Brom; October 3, 1971 (age 55); Cascade Township, Minnesota, U.S.
- Other name: None
- Occupation: None
- Spouse: None
- Children: None
- Parent(s): Bernard Brom and Paulette Brom
- Motive: Unknown
- Conviction: First degree murder (4 counts)
- Penalty: Life imprisonment (Paroled in 2025)

Details
- Date: February 18, 1988
- Location: Rochester, Minnesota
- Target: Family
- Killed: 4
- Weapon: Axe

David Francis Brom (born October 3, 1971) is an American mass murderer. He killed his parents, brother, and sister with an axe in February 1988 at the family's home in Rochester, Minnesota after an argument with his father.

In the early evening of February 18, 1988, Olmsted County sheriff's deputies discovered the bodies of Bernard (41), Paulette (41), Diane (13), and Richard (11) Brom in the Brom family home. Missing from the home were the two oldest sons, David (16) and Joseph (18). The police had been notified by the administration of David's school that students had reported hearing a "rumor" that David had informed another student that he had killed his family that morning. All four individuals had sustained numerous gashes in the head and upper body. Police subsequently found a blood-stained axe in the basement that forensic tests indicated was used to kill all four victims.

Immediately after the discovery, the police were concerned that David might be the victim of an abduction, but a friend of David's informed the police that David himself told her that he killed his family, and testified to the discussion in the subsequent trial. She told jurors at the trial that Brom stopped her on the morning of February 18, 1988, as she was going to school, and convinced her to skip school with him. He then detailed how he killed his parents, brother and sister. "He said he hit his dad with an axe, he kept hitting his dad and his dad kept on getting up." The girl said Brom told her he had gotten into an argument with his father at about 11:30 p.m. the previous night, and that he then stayed up until about 3 a.m. She indicated that Brom detailed the crime, saying that he went to his parents' room, first killing his father. Then he hit his mother and went to his brother's room. Then he saw his sister standing over their mother in the upstairs hallway, at which point he attacked them both.

Brom was captured on February 19, 1988, while using a pay phone near the local post office. His case was initially referred to the juvenile court system because his age at the time of the crimes was 16, but was eventually sent to the adult judicial system based on the severity of the crime. As Brom's defense claim was insanity, mental illness was a factor in the trial, and much media and legal focus was placed on Minnesota's use of the M'Naghten Rules in determining if Brom was legally insane at the time of the crime. On October 16, 1989, Brom was convicted of first degree murder and was given three consecutive and one concurrent life terms with 52 years and 6 months to serve before becoming eligible for parole.

In 2023, Brom's minimum term was reduced to make him immediately eligible for parole under a new state law restricting life terms for juveniles in Minnesota. Brom was granted parole in July 2025. He was freed under a work release program on July 29, 2025.

Brom was housed at the Minnesota Correctional Facility – Lino Lakes prior to his release.

During Brom's trial, American experimental music group Negativland issued a satirical press release claiming that Brom's actions may have been inspired by their 1987 song "Christianity Is Stupid", and that federal authorities had asked them to cancel an upcoming US tour and avoid travel until the conclusion of the trial. The band had decided to cancel the tour upon concluding that it would result in a financial loss, but sought an excuse in order to avoid pressure from their label, SST Records. Local media coverage of the story formed the basis of their 1989 album Helter Stupid.
