= Don Joyce (musician) =

- Born: Donald S. Joyce; February 9, 1944; Keene, New Hampshire, United States
- Died: July 22, 2015 (aged 71) Oakland, California
- Genres: Experimental; Sound collage Plunderphonics
- Occupation: Culture jamming
- Instruments: Fidelipac; Turntable; Tape recorder Booper
- Website: https://archive.org/details/ote

Donald S. Joyce (February 9, 1944 – July 22, 2015) was an American musician who was a member of the experimental music group Negativland. He also hosted a weekly radio program called Over the Edge on the Berkeley, California, radio station KPFA, for more than 30 years.

== Early life ==
Joyce was born in Keene, New Hampshire. Originally a visual artist, he earned a master's degree in painting from the Rhode Island School of Design before moving to the Bay Area, where he lived most of his life.

== Career ==
Joyce began his Bay Area radio career in the 1970s at KALX, where he worked as an on-air programmer, and produced station IDs, promotional spots and other continuity. At KALX, he produced a weekly summer replacement program for the news called The Alternative News, featuring fictional news stories. The last episode of The Alternative News included the eco-revolutionary character Thunderman, which led to his producing a multipart serial called Thunderteam for KPFA.

While working at KPFA, he met Ian Allen and other members of Negativland. Joyce began developing his sound collage techniques using radio and television broadcasts captured on tape and blending them into layered mixes, each with a unique theme. Heavily influenced by Bob and Ray and the Firesign Theater, Joyce developed a number of continuing characters whom he would portray in the more theatrical episodes of Over The Edge.

In 1984, he coined the phrase culture jamming. Using his alter ego, cultural reviewer Crosley Bendix, he presented an explanation of culture jamming and its importance on the 1984 album Over the Edge Vol. 1: JAMCON'84:

As awareness of how the media environment we occupy affects and directs our inner life grows, some resist. The skillfully reworked billboard . . . directs the public viewer to a consideration of the original corporate strategy. The studio for the cultural jammer is the world at large.

== Death ==
Joyce died of heart failure in Oakland, California, on July 22, 2015, at the age of 71. He was cremated, and the band packaged two grams of his remains with the first 1000 CD copies of Negativland's 2016 album Over the Edge Vol. 9: The Chopping Channel. 750 of his O.T.E. and live show Fidelipac audio carts were also sent along with those ashes. Don's remains became a viral story on the internet.

Following Joyce's death, filmmaker Ryan Worsley directed an 80-minute documentary, How Radio Isn't Done, featuring surviving members of Negativland as well as archival footage of Joyce himself.
