= Escape Mechanism =

Escape Mechanism is the title of a sound collage project instigated by Minneapolis-based artist Jonathan Nelson. Using fragments of audio from a variety of previously recorded sound sources, the project is an experiment in recycled media.

Escape Mechanism has taken many forms since Nelson began the project in 1997. From solo studio releases and theatrical sound design, to a live ensemble and sound installation, the project is defined by its re-use of sounds found in the broadcast media.

Although essentially a studio project, Escape Mechanism experimented briefly (1999 – 2001) with live improvisation. Performing under the name Cast of Thousands with Escape Mechanism, the rotating ensemble also worked exclusively with bits and pieces of the media environment, performing at art venues and performances spaces such as The Walker Art Center, the Soap Factory and The First Avenue Main Room.

Escape Mechanism has collaborated with artists such as Steev Hise, The Tape-beatles and Wobbly, and mounted sound installations at art galleries such as The Blue Theater, Rosalux Gallery and The Rochester Art Center.

Escape Mechanism proudly presents itself as 100% recycled, as every sound found in an Escape Mechanism composition is recycled from a previously recorded source. No original sounds are incorporated; only original juxtapositions.

== Some Assembly Required ==
Nelson is perhaps best known for his role as host and producer of the nationally syndicated radio program Some Assembly Required. The show is a weekly exploration of works of appropriation, by artists who use samplers and other audio playback equipment to create original sound collage compositions.

The program brings together artists from multiple genres, and has featured interviews with sound collage artists such as The Bran Flakes, Emergency Broadcast Network, The Evolution Control Committee, Omer Fast, DJ Food, The Freelance Hellraiser, Girl Talk, Go Home Productions, Christian Marclay, Negativland, John Oswald, People Like Us, DJ Qbert, DJ Spooky, Steinski, The Tape-beatles and many more, since 1999.

A record label (Recombinations) and recurring art exhibition (Festival of Appropriation) are among Nelson's other projects. His visual work has shown at galleries such as The Rogue Buddha, Outsiders and Others and Rosalux Gallery.

== Album Discography ==
- Box of Blue Paperclips (1997, out of print)
- Escape Mechanism (1998, Recombinations, REC004)
- Minneapolis Summit (2002, Staalplaat, with Steev Hise, The Tape-beatles and Wobbly)
- Cast of Thousands with Escape Mechanism (2004, Recombinations, REC003)
- (Emphasis Added) (2008, Recombinations, REC006)

== Interviews ==
- Radio Feature Interview with Escape Mechanism's Jonathan Nelson on National Public Radio (2009).
- Video Feature Jonathan Nelson profiled in a Minnesota Stories video at mnartists.org (2006).
