= Some Assembly Required (radio program) =

Sound collage radio program

Tape Manipulations, Digital Deconstructions and Turntable Creations: The Some Assembly Required radio show

Some Assembly Required is a sound collage radio program in the United States, produced in Minneapolis, Minnesota. It is the first radio show known to focus exclusively on works of sample based music, and appropriation in audio art. The nationally syndicated program features work by artists from a variety of genres, including plunderphonics, hip hop turntablism, musique concrète, noise, mashup, sound art and more. The program celebrated its tenth anniversary on January 27, 2009. The final episode originally aired in 2011.

Since 2021, new episodes are being produced, monthly, via the website and for radio stations, such as KBOO, in Portland, OR. Additional monthly episodes are also produced for The Wiggle Room, on The Sheena's Jungle Room stream, at wfmu.org.

Some Assembly Required has featured interviews with a number of influential sound collage artists including The Bran Flakes, Emergency Broadcast Network, The Evolution Control Committee, Omer Fast, DJ Food, The Freelance Hellraiser, Girl Talk, Go Home Productions, Christian Marclay, Negativland, John Oswald, People Like Us, DJ Qbert, DJ Spooky, Steinski, The Tape-beatles, Wayne Butane and many more.

The program began as a streaming online radio show in 1999, at the University of Minnesota college radio station KUOM, and quickly became a feature on the station's broadcast schedule. The radio program has aired on dozens of college, community and public radio stations across the United States and Canada and is heard online via its podcast. Some Assembly Required is hosted by Jon Nelson and produced at Post Consumer Productions.

== Reviews and articles ==
- The Art of Mashups By Tom Ashbrook, On Point, February 5, 2009
- Jon Nelson of Escape Mechanism by Katya Tylevich A.V. Club Twin Cities, January 28, 2009
- Some Assembly Required: Mash-Up Pioneer Dreams in Soundbites By Elizabeth Held, Wired Magazine December 22, 2008
