= Night Ripper =

Studio album by Girl Talk
- Released: May 9, 2006
- Genre: Mashup
- Length: 42:05
- Label: Illegal Art
- Producer: Gregg Gillis

Girl Talk chronology
Stop Cleveland Hate (2004)	Night Ripper (2006)	Bone Hard Zaggin' (2006)

Night Ripper is the third studio album by American musician Gregg Gillis, released under his stage name Girl Talk on May 8, 2006, by Illegal Art. It is a mashup album primarily composed of samples taken from other artists' music, while also incorporating minor amounts of original instrumentation recorded by Gillis himself. Produced as one seamless piece of music before subsequently being broken into individual tracks, Night Ripper was composed by Gillis in a period of around eight months, during which he divided time between production of the album and his work as a biomedical engineer.

Illegal Art initially released Night Ripper as a digital download on their website, later making the album available on other sites and shipping the album to select record stores due to strong demand. None of the samples used on the album was cleared prior to release, causing several online retailers to pull the album from their listings. Night Ripper was later re-released for download on the Illegal Art website through a new "pay what you want" pricing system.

Night Ripper received generally positive reviews from critics, who commended Gillis' choice of samples and his efficiency at layering them together to create new tracks. It appeared in numerous publications' year-end lists of the best albums of 2006. The album has been described as Gillis' breakthrough album, helping boost his reputation and leading several artists to commission him for remix work.

== Background and production ==
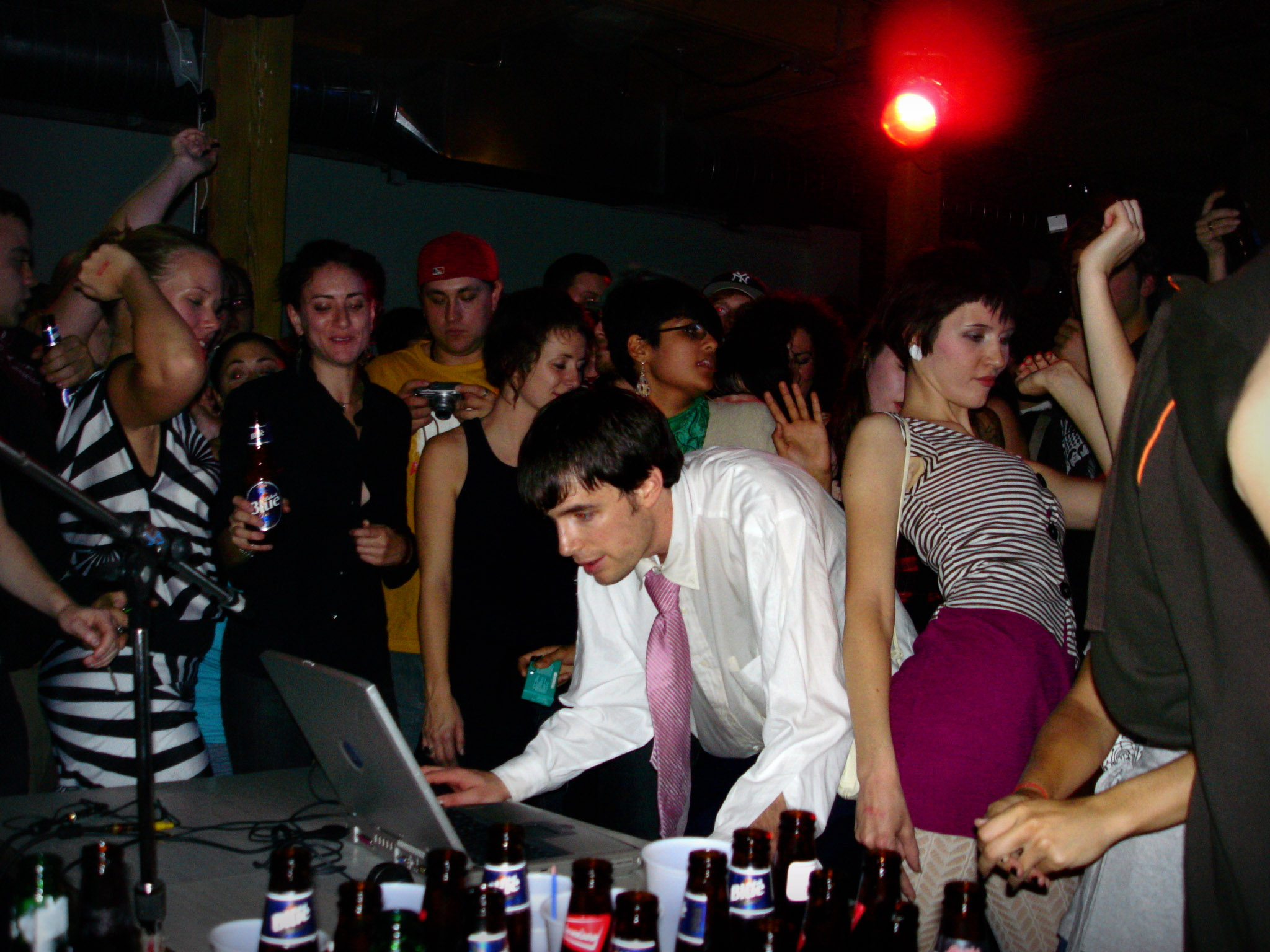
Girl Talk performing in 2006

The second studio album by Girl Talk, Unstoppable, marked a shift away from the glitch style of his debut Secret Diary. While still retaining the sample-based nature of Secret Diary, Unstoppable focused more on beatwork as well as structuring and layering samples into full tracks. The album's stylistic change was brought about by Gillis' experiences performing live, which influenced him to "make the music more accessible and push the party vibe." Following the release of Unstoppable, he spent an additional two years touring before beginning work on his third studio album.

Described by Gillis as "a record that reflects [his] own personal music tastes," Night Ripper features over 300 samples of other artists' songs, spanning several decades and genres. Commenting on the process of choosing samples to use, he explained: "I'll just hear something on the radio or at a party and go ahead and sample it off a CD or record or download it. I sample loops and breaks and vocal clips all the time. So I've been cataloguing samples for years, I have this massive library. Songs come out everyday so it's never ending."

"Once Again"
A 27-second clip from the album's opening track "Once Again", in which Ying Yang Twins' "Wait (The Whisper Song)" is mixed with The Verve's "Bitter Sweet Symphony".

The entirety of Night Ripper was produced using a WAV digital audio editor, with Gillis manipulating samples by chopping, layering and transitioning them. He also recorded original synthesizer and keyboard instrumentation for certain tracks. The album was created by Gillis as one long piece of music, which he subsequently split into individual tracks. He was also working as a biomedical engineer at the time, obliging him to divide his time between his day job and his music career, including production of the album; production of the album took around eight months to complete. Subsequent audio mastering was done by Jonathan Schenke.

== Release ==
Illegal Art released Night Ripper on May 8, 2006 as a digital download on their website. Strong demand prompted the label to produce physical CD and LP copies of the album for shipping to select record stores, as well as make it available for purchase on several online retailers. Illegal Art did not clear any of the samples used on Night Ripper, leading to several problems in the album's distribution and release. At least one CD manufacturing plant refused to press the album, and the head of another plant asked Gillis and his label to justify the use of two specifically chosen samples. Online music stores eMusic and iTunes both pulled Night Ripper from sale due to sample clearance concerns. Anticipating lawsuits, Illegal Art prepared a defense citing the fair use trademark law as a legal backbone for the album's use of samples. The label also went over the possibility of a royalty system, but ultimately scrapped it when they decided that it would only weaken their fair use argument. When asked about the possibility of suing Gillis and Illegal Art, however, one major-label executive stated his belief that filing a lawsuit against a minor independent label – especially for an album which, at that point, had barely sold 10,000 copies – would only bring bad publicity. Ultimately, no lawsuits materialized in wake of the album's success, which Gillis described as "liberating."

The album's positive reception boosted Gillis' popularity and reputation, and Night Ripper has been described as his breakthrough album. Following the album's release, American musician Beck asked Gillis to open for him at a concert in London. Blender also invited him to perform at their MTV Video Music Awards after-party. Several artists commissioned Gillis to produce remixes of their tracks, including Beck, Good Charlotte, Grizzly Bear and Peter Bjorn and John. Night Ripper has sold over 20,000 copies in the United States, according to Nielsen SoundScan. Recalling in a 2016 interview, almost ten years after the release of the album, Gillis said, "Night Ripper was clearly the album that took off for me and definitely changed my life."

== Critical reception ==
Professional ratings
Review scores
Source	Rating
AllMusic	3.5/5 stars
The A.V. Club	A−
Blender	4/5 stars
MSN Music (Consumer Guide)	A−
NME	5/10
Pitchfork	8.4/10
PopMatters	7/10
Q	3/5 stars
Tiny Mix Tapes	5/5
Uncut	4/5 stars

Night Ripper was generally well received by contemporary music critics. In a rave review, Cam Lindsay of Exclaim! praised the album's "extraordinary" cohesion and wrote: "Gillis is a rigorous craftsman, and his assembling skill is near perfect down to the second, introducing the next song at the most opportune moment." Pitchfork's Sean Fennessey also responded favorably, commending the "pure precision" of Girl Talk's sampling and naming the album the "soundtrack of the summer" for 2006. Robert Christgau, in his "Consumer Guide" column for MSN Music, called Night Ripper "the best mash-up album since 2002's The Best Bootlegs in the World Ever" and compared Girl Talk to prominent samplers DJ Shadow and The Avalanches, "only with obvious samples rather than obscure ones".

While stating that the album's reliance on samples of popular music makes it "lose its appeal after a few spins", Marisa Brown of AllMusic wrote that Girl Talk's "ability to draw from a myriad of musical sources" allows Night Ripper to "appeal to anyone who's heard the radio... in the past few years." Similarly, Nate Dorr of PopMatters remarked that the album "holds undeniable appeal, both for sample trainspotters and music geeks... as well as, more importantly perhaps, for the much broader cross-section of listeners who just want to put on a consistently catchy, entertaining record."

Dan Silver of NME said that while the "sheer scope" of Girl Talk's sampling sets him apart from other mash-up artists, Night Ripper "begins to feel much less than the sum of its samples," ultimately describing it as "not so much a work of art, then, as the basis for a 21st century parlour game." Cameron Macdonald of Stylus Magazine dismissed the album as "nothing more than a DJ mix with escapist fun so thick that it is unlikely that listeners will pause the record after every minute to discuss how Gillis battles tentacles of the corporate record industry's squid." While writing that the album "isn't exactly high art", Noel Murray of The A.V. Club described Night Ripper as "one of the most purely fun albums to come along since The Go! Team's debut" and advised readers to obtain the record "before it gets sued out of existence."

== Accolades ==
Publication lists

Year-end
Publication	Rank	Ref
Blender	13	
Idolator	17	
Paste	92	
Pitchfork	34	
Refinery29	20	
Rolling Stone	22	
Spin	27	
Village Voice	39	
Decade-end
The A.V. Club	47	
Pitchfork	159	
Slant Magazine	126	
Stylus Magazine	93	
Under the Radar	182	
All-time (Mashup)
Vibe	1	

Awards

Year	Nominee / work	Award	Result	Ref.
2006	Night Ripper	Shortlist Music Prize	Nominated	
2007	Night Ripper	Wired Rave Award	Won	

== Track listing ==
All songs composed by Gregg Gillis (Girl Talk).

1. "Once Again" – 2:40
2. "That's My DJ" – 2:08
3. "Hold Up" – 2:50
4. "Too Deep" – 2:29
5. "Smash Your Head" – 3:01
6. "Minute by Minute" – 3:12
7. "Ask About Me" – 2:26
8. "Summer Smoke" – 2:17
9. "Friday Night" – 3:12
10. "Hand Clap" – 1:53
11. "Give and Go" – 2:53
12. "Bounce That" – 3:24
13. "Warm It Up" – 2:15
14. "Double Pump" – 1:45
15. "Overtime" – 2:15
16. "Peak Out" – 3:20

== Personnel ==
Credits for Night Ripper adapted from album notes.

Production

- Girl Talk – music, production
- Jonathan Schenke – audio mastering

Design

- Andrew "Andriu" Strasser – sleeve design

In addition, 164 artists sampled on Night Ripper are thanked in the liner notes of the album.

== Bibliography ==
- Kot, Greg (2009). Ripped: How the Wired Generation Revolutionized Music. Scribner. ISBN 978-1-4165-4731-0.
- McLeod, Kembrew; DiCola, Peter (2011). Creative License: The Law and Culture of Digital Sampling. Duke University Press. ISBN 978-0-8223-4875-7.
