= I Have Hands =

2009 studio album by the Bran Flakes

Studio album by The Bran Flakes
- Released: 24 February 2009
- Genre: Sound collage; Indie pop
- Length: 50:57
- Label: Illegal Art
- Producer: The Bran Flakes

The Bran Flakes chronology
Bubbles (2007)	I Have Hands (2009)	Raymond Scott Rewired (2014)

I Have Hands is the sixth studio album by the American indie pop duo the Bran Flakes. It was released on 24 February 2009 on the Illegal Art label. Various music videos for the tracks were released on the Bran Flakes' official YouTube channel from January 2009 to June 2009.

== Track listing ==
All tracks are written by The Bran Flakes.

No.	Title	Length
1.	"Hi"	1:34
2.	"Rodeo Butterfly"	2:39
3.	"KLAM"	0:13
4.	"Stumble Out Of Bed"	2:51
5.	"I'm Not Feeling Very Well"	0:05
6.	"Marchy March"	2:09
7.	"Don Knotts"	0:26
8.	"The Girl That I Used To Be"	1:36
9.	"What It's All About"	1:49
10.	"Dance Of The Sugarsnap Fairy"	2:12
11.	"Singing Dogs"	2:05
12.	"Make A Funny Sound"	0:40
13.	"You Can Do Most Anything"	1:21
14.	"Do You Want Salad With Your Taco"	0:45
15.	"Mini Mountain Queen"	3:01
16.	"The Sidewalk Song"	2:16
17.	"I Wonder Where My Grandmother Is"	1:07
18.	"Mr. And Mrs. Footsie"	1:59
19.	"Funky Feeling"	1:20
20.	"I Comb My Hair Sideways"	2:03
21.	"Van Pop"	2:00
22.	"If I Loved You"	2:31
23.	"Fifty Four Fifty"	1:07
24.	"Jump Up"	2:39
25.	"Beat Head"	2:36
26.	"The Crickets Ditty"	2:00
27.	"Sunshine Country"	2:00
28.	"I Am A Promise"	0:41
29.	"I Have A Friend"	3:03
30.	"Bye"	0:22
Total length:		50:57

== Personnel ==
The Bran Flakes

- Otis Fodder
- Mildred Pitt
