= Deconstructing Beck =

Compilation album by Various artists
- Released: 17 February 1998
- Recorded: 1997–1998
- Genres: Experimental; plunderphonics
- Length: 54:52
- Labels: Illegal Art; Seeland Records
- Producer: Philo T. Farnsworth

Deconstructing Beck is a compilation album released on February 17, 1998, by an anonymous group posing as Illegal Art. The album is a compilation of 13 tracks created completely from samples of American musician Beck which, by artistic intention of the group, were not approved by Geffen Records, and its release set off a large scale legal battle between the two record labels which attracted worldwide media attention. According to cultural critic Steven Shaviro, the release of Deconstructing Beck served as a challenge to the music industry since Beck's discography prominently features samples, and paved the way for new media art that became oriented around the limitations of copyright law.

== Background and legacy ==
Deconstructing Beck is a compilation of 13 tracks created by various artists. The album was produced by the anonymous sample recording label named Illegal Art which was created by an anonymous person or persons under the pseudonym Philo T. Farnsworth. The album is, as a whole, created completely out of samples taken, intentionally without authorization or payment, from Beck's discography; when the release of the album was announced in February 1998, Illegal Art made great efforts to inform Beck's lawyers. Beck's lawyers immediately threatened to sue on the grounds of copyright infringement which resulted in a high-profile controversy, but Beck's lawyers and publicist were never able to take legal action since the identity of Philo T. and the actual location of Illegal Art were both anonymous.

=== Reappraisal ===
Cultural critic Steven Shaviro's article "Deconstructing Beck" uses the album as an avant-garde turning point regarding the use of appropriation and sampling in the music industry today. Shaviro's article takes issue with the legalities of sound/image ownership and copyrights. Shaviro's utilization of the controversy surrounding Beck and Deconstructing Beck bring questions such as "who owns the images and sounds around us?" and "what does it mean to own a sound?" to the surface.

Others have since reappraised the album's value as a legal experiment as well as a musical project.

== Track listing ==
No.	Title	Created by	Length
1.	"Paving the Road to Hell Pt2"	Mr. Meridies	3:37
2.	"Puzzels & Pagans"	Jane Dowe	2:26
3.	"Killer Control Enters Blackhole"	Huk Don Phun	4:47
4.	"Stuck Together, Falling Apart"	Steev Hise	5:53
5.	"Void Transaction"	The International Bankers	4:09
6.	"Burning Today's Memory"	Corporal Blossom	4:24
7.	"So Cal Weevil Dream"	Mr. Meridies	4:04
8.	"One Beck in the Grave"	Evolution Control Committee	3:16
9.	"Eggs Eggs, Arms Legs"	Spacklequeen	2:59
10.	"Doublefolded"	Hromlegn Kainn	6:09
11.	"Carpet Tunnel Syndrome"	Mr. Meridies	4:59
12.	"Bust a Move"	Jane Dowe	2:59
13.	"Fat Zone"	J. Teller	4:27
