= Some Assembly Required =

Some Assembly Required may refer to:

== Television ==
=== Series ===
- Some Assembly Required (2007 TV series), a Discovery Channel show
- Some Assembly Required (2014 TV series), TV series on Canadian channel YTV

=== Episodes ===
- "Some Assembly Required" (Buffy the Vampire Slayer), a 1997 television episode
- "Some Assembly Required" (Dark Angel), a 2001 episode of the television series Dark Angel
- "Some Assembly Required" (Frasier episode), a 2003 episode, the nineteenth episode of the tenth season of Frasier
- "Some Assembly Required" (The Avengers: Earth's Mightiest Heroes), a 2010 episode of the animated television series The Avengers: Earth's Mightiest Heroes
- "Some Assembly Required" (Arthur), a 2015 episode of Arthur
- "Some Assembly Required" (Battle for Dream Island), a 2026 web series episode
- "Some Assembly Required", a 2009 episode of Handy Manny

== Music ==
- Some Assembly Required (album), a 2009 album by American rock band Assembly Of Dust
- "Some Assembly Required", a song by Mudvayne from Kill, I Oughtta
- "Some Assembly Required", a song from the Portal 2 video game soundtrack
- Some Assembly Required (radio program), an American music radio program

== Other uses ==
- Spy Fox 2: "Some Assembly Required", a 1999 video game

== See also ==
- Assembly Required (History Channel USA), a 2021-debut maker/inventor/tinkerer competition skills TV game show starring hosts April Wilkerson, Richard Karn, Tim Allen
