= Anachronauts =

Anachronauts may also refer to:

- Anachronauts (comics), a Marvel Comics supervillain team
- Anachronauts (band), a Baton Rouge, Louisiana based surf music band from the 1990s
- Anachronauts audiobook, a Doctor Who audio book by Big Finish
