= Feed the Animals =

Studio album by Girl Talk
- Released: June 19, 2008
- Genres: Mashup; plunderphonics
- Length: 53:53
- Label: Illegal Art
- Producer: Gregg Gillis

Girl Talk chronology
Bone Hard Zaggin' (2006)	Feed the Animals (2008)	All Day (2010)

Feed the Animals is the fourth studio album by American musician Gregg Gillis, released under his stage name Girl Talk by Illegal Art on June 19, 2008. Illegal Art originally released the album as a digital download through their website using a "pay what you want" pricing system. Like much of his previous work, Gillis composed Feed the Animals almost entirely using samples of other artists' music and minor elements of his own original instrumentation.

== Background ==
Gillis stated that with Feed the Animals, he wanted to produce an album "you can sit down, relax, and listen to over and over again, finding out new things", in contrast with the fast-paced, frenetic nature of his live performances. Feed the Animals builds on the mashup format of previous Girl Talk albums, with Gillis using over 300 samples of music by other artists to compose the album's fourteen tracks. He produced the album as one long piece of music, which was then subsequently broken into individual songs. Gillis felt that the album "works towards a bigger whole" and initially considered releasing the album as a single piece without track divisions, but ultimately decided against the idea, as he felt that "the end of the album would get so neglected, and if your favorite moment was a 30-second bit at the 40-minute mark, it would be really annoying to have that."

== Release ==
On June 19, 2008, Feed the Animals was made available for download by Girl Talk's record label, Illegal Art, sells Feed the Animals using a "pay what you want" system for non-seamless MP3 files. Gillis explained that the goal behind the special payment system was to "make it easier for people to get their hands on the music", which he described as his "number one priority." Additional content was made available to paying users, including FLAC files and a one-file seamless MP3 version of the album for those paying at least $5.00, and a CD copy for those paying at least $10.00. Non-paying users have to select a reason for doing so from a list of provided options: "I may donate later"; "I can't afford to pay"; "I don't really like Girl Talk"; "I don't believe in paying for music"; "I have already purchased this album"; "I don't value music made from sampling"; "I am part of the press, radio, or music industry", or "other reasons".

The physical CD release of Feed the Animals was announced by Illegal Art with a slated release date of September 23, 2008. Manufacturing issues involving the production of the CDs, however, forced the release to be pushed back to a final release date of November 11, 2008. A vinyl LP release of Feed the Animals was released in 2020.

== Reception ==
Professional ratings
Aggregate scores
Source	Rating
Metacritic	76/100
Review scores
Source	Rating
AllMusic	4/5 stars
The A.V. Club	B+
Blender	4/5 stars
Chicago Sun-Times	3.5/4 stars
MSN Music (Consumer Guide)	A
Paste	8.0/10
Pitchfork	8.0/10
Rolling Stone	4/5 stars
Slant Magazine	4/5 stars
Spin	3.5/5 stars

In their December 2008 issue, Blender magazine named Feed the Animals as the second best album of 2008, behind only Lil Wayne's Tha Carter III. In Australia, the album debuted at number 83 on the ARIA Albums Chart in February 2009.

== Track listing ==
1. "Play Your Part (Pt. 1)" – 4:45
2. "Shut the Club Down" – 3:07
3. "Still Here" – 3:57
4. "What It's All About" – 4:15
5. "Set It Off" – 3:42
6. "No Pause" – 3:12
7. "Like This" – 3:21
8. "Give Me a Beat" – 4:12
9. "Hands in the Air" – 4:20
10. "In Step" – 3:23
11. "Let Me See You" – 4:04
12. "Here's the Thing" – 4:46
13. "Don't Stop" – 2:58
14. "Play Your Part (Pt. 2)" – 3:25

== Charts ==
Chart (2009)	Peak position
Australian Albums (ARIA)	83
