= Full Court Press =

A full-court press is a tactic in basketball. It may also refer to:

- Full Court Press (album), a 2022 album by Girl Talk, Wiz Khalifa, Big K.R.I.T., and Smoke DZA
- Full Court Press (TV series), a 2024 American documentary series about women's basketball
- Full Court Press with Greta Van Susteren, talk show hosted by Greta Van Susteren
