= Broken Ankles =

Broken Ankles may refer to:

- Ankle fractures
- Broken Ankles (EP), a 2014 EP by Girl Talk and Freeway
