= Multiverse (album) =

Studio album by Wiz Khalifa
- Released: July 29, 2022
- Studio: Khalifa's home studio, Encino, Los Angeles
- Genre: Hip-hop; R&B; pop
- Length: 59:14
- Label: Taylor Gang; Asylum
- Producer: Ayo Roc; Bankroll Got It; CJ Branch; Diego Ave; DJ Moon; Don Cannon; E. Dan; Girl Talk; Hitmaka; ID Labs; Illa Sounds; Irvin Washington; Kenneth Wright; Kofo; Medasin; Nico; Scott Storch; Sledgren; TM88; Quadwoofer Bangz

Wiz Khalifa chronology
Full Court Press (2022)	Multiverse (2022)	Decisions (2023)

Singles from Multiverse
- 1. "Iced Out Necklace" Released: April 1, 2022; 2. "Bad Ass Bitches" Released: June 24, 2022; 3. "Memory Lane" Released: July 22, 2022

Multiverse is the seventh solo studio album by American rapper Wiz Khalifa, released July 29, 2022, by Taylor Gang Entertainment and Asylum Records. Khalifa announced the album July 13 along with revealing the cover art. This is Khalifa's first solo album since 2018's Rolling Papers 2, but his third full project of 2022, the other two being his collaborative albums Stoner's Night with Juicy J and Full Court Press with Big K.R.I.T., Smoke DZA, and Girl Talk. The deluxe edition was released on October 21, 2022, with 3 new songs.

== Background ==
When asked by Stereogum's Earl Hopkins, the co-author of "Raps of Resistance: How Kendrick Lamar & J. Cole Reignited a Hip-Hop Tradition," how the album adds to his legacy, Wiz Khalifa said that "as an artist, it shows a lot of growth — things that people might know about me", "gives me an opportunity to touch on a lot of different subjects and talk about things in different ways, but still get the same respect or reaction", and "shows a lot of freedom as far as taking risks, designing things the way I see them fit, and also not going straight towards a trend or what they see as popular, but to create something else and give people the option to dive into it." With Vibe's Preezy Brown, Wiz explained the album's name coming "from the unique world that I live in and experience", as well as the process of building and recording from his home studio in Encino, California. For VMan, Khalifa said the central theme of the album was love: "There's the love of relationships, love of me being a father, and love for yourself. Those are a lot of the main topics that I wanted to talk about and bring to the forefront." For the album name, the word "multiverse" "takes on new meanings": "So you have the 'multi-' which shows how versatile I am, and then you have 'verse', which is what I'm saying."

== Style and reception ==
Shifter's Kevin Bourne writes that Khalifa "has returned to form as a solo artist" and "brings his full repertoire and arsenal to the project, exploring different themes and sounds, while delivering a complete body of work." This includes album opener "Big Daddy Wiz"'s "little groove and funk", which contains a sample of Cheryl Lynn's "Got to Be Real"; "1000 Women" with a saxophone accompaniment and lyrics about Khalifa's "priority being having children and one woman in his life", which "is grown ass man messaging that is in stark contrast to what we hear in music today"; "Keys" which contrasts "beautiful storytelling about life and love" with drill production; and closer "Thank Him" which sees Khalifa discussing his faith in God. The album as a whole shows "a content, happy and free Khalifa" and "exudes the freedom we've always known him for, but perhaps in even greater measure (and it's refreshing to hear and experience) along with "mature content with good messaging, demonstrating growth without coming across as preachy or corny."

Clash's Naima Sutton notes the album having "drill, hip-hop, pop, R&B and a little bit of 80s synth influences floating around." In some ways, the album "present[s] as slightly confused", but in others it "delve[s] into a more experimental realm than Wiz had been through in his past releases." This experimentation brings a risk of "sounding a little bit out of place and not in the avant-garde 'I wanted it like that' kind of way", which "appears to be what happened on "We Don't Go Out to Nightclubs Anymore/Candlelight Girl" where a brilliant horn-laden intro gives way to a second half that places an ill-fitting pop-style lyricism on top of what would otherwise be a spectacular interlude." While it "seems incredibly limiting to hold an artist like Wiz Khalifa to his highest points on every release", and Khalifa "connects very closely with the message he's putting together", the album "couldn't be presented as his best work", though "it still holds weight in the scope of his releases and points to an artist who is still seeking adaptation and new spaces from growth within their catalogue."

The Honey Pop's Kristian Gonzales notes the album's fusion of hip-hop with 1970s-80s R&B and pop as possibly inspired by Childish Gambino & Tyler, the Creator, as well as highlighting "MVP"'s "G-funk vibe & singsong flows"; "Something Real"'s "deepest venture into pop balladry, delivering a track fit for a 1980s John Hughes film"; "We Don't Go Out to Nightclubs Anymore/Candlelight Girl" "echo[ing] the quiet storm romanticism of New Edition & Luther Vandross"; and "Mirror Love (Groove 2)" which "continues the 1980s vibe reminiscent of Phil Collins & Prince, complete with an electric guitar solo."

== Track listing ==
Multiverse track listing
No.	Title	Writer(s)	Producers	Length
1.	"Big Daddy Wiz" (featuring Girl Talk)	Cameron Thomaz; Gregg Gillis	Girl Talk	2:11
2.	"MVP"	Thomaz; Eric Dan; Gillis	Girl Talk; ID Labs	2:35
3.	"Memory Lane"	Thomaz; Joel Banks; Taylor Banks	Bankroll Got It; Hitmaka; Ayo Roc; Kenny (Note: Additional production); Saxl Rose	2:47
4.	"1000 Women" (featuring They)	Thomaz; Francis Leblanc; Joy Olasunmibo Ogunmakin; Andrew Neely; Christian J. Ward	Kofo; Ayo; Hitmaka; Fridayy; Saxl Rose; Kenneth Wright	3:42
5.	"Like You (Groove 3)"	Thomaz; Wright	Wright	1:55
6.	"Something Real"	Thomaz; Scott Storch; Ray Fraser	Scott Storch; Illa Sounds	3:58
7.	"High Maintenance"	Thomaz; Grant Nelson; Gillis	Girl Talk; Medasin; Kenneth Wright	3:21
8.	"Bad Ass Bitches"	Thomaz; Jermaine Anthony Preyan; Ivory Scott; Derrick Ordogne; Dion Norman; J. Banks; T. Banks; Jimi Payton; Byron Thomas; Ashanti Douglas; Dwayne Carter, Jr.	Bankroll Got It; Hitmaka; Diego Ave	1:58
9.	"Iced Out Necklace"	Thomaz; Edward Murray	Sledgren	2:36
10.	"Keys"	Thomaz; Blair Avien Lee Reese	Quadwoofer Bangz	4:00
11.	"We Don't Go Out to Nightclubs Anymore / Candlelight Girl"	Thomaz; Clarence Branch; Wright; Irvin Washington	Kenneth Wright; Irvin Washington; CJ Branch	8:11
12.	"We're Not Even"	Thomaz; Javar Rockamore; Christopher Dotson; Christian J. Ward; Robert Reese	Hitmaka; Saxl Rose; Kenneth Wright	3:44
13.	"Homies"	Thomaz; Bryan Lamar Simmons	Don Cannon; TM88	6:30
14.	"Mirror Love (Groove 2)"	Thomaz; Wright; Washington	Kenneth Wright; Irvin Washington	3:51
15.	"Goyard Bags" (featuring They)	Thomaz; Jeremy Phillip Felton; Mami Yanbasan; Kyle Featherstone; Shawn Holmes; Dante Jones; Neely; David Phelps; Ward	Hitmaka	1:30
16.	"Nobody Knows"	Thomaz; Gillis	Girl Talk; Kenneth Wright	3:26
17.	"Thank Him"	Thomaz; Dan; Nico Baran; Corey Moon	Nico; DJ Moon; ID Labs; TM88	2:59
Total length:				59:14

Deluxe edition bonus tracks
No.	Title	Writer(s)	Producer(s)	Length
18.	"We Can Get More"	Thomaz; Dominic Bailey; Miles Emmanuel Foley Beining	Foley; Dom Bailey; Kenneth Wright	5:57
19.	"Funkin'"	Thomaz; Wright	Kenneth Wright	4:51
20.	"Lost"	Thomaz; Wright	Kenneth Wright	3:08
Total length:				73:10

== Personnel ==
- Wiz Khalifa – lead vocals
- Aaron Dahl – engineering
- Eric "E. Dan" Dan – mixing engineer
- Joe LaPorta – mastering engineer
