= Crash Course in Science =

American post-punk band

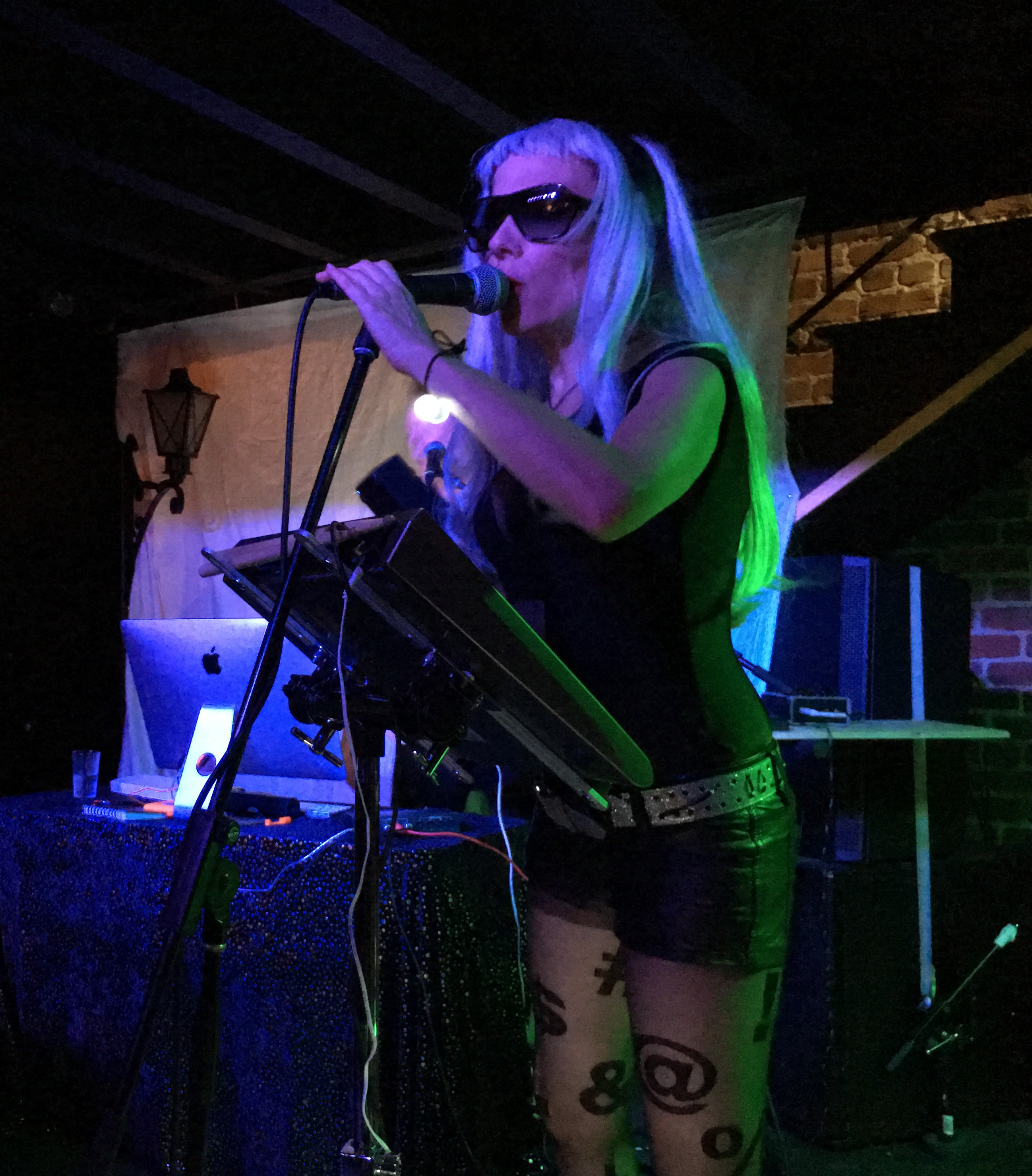
- Mallory Yago performing with Crash Course in Science in Oakland, California in 2017

Background information
- Origin: Philadelphia, Pennsylvania, United States
- Genres: Post-punk; minimal wave; synth punk; electro-industrial
- Years active: 1979–81; 2009–present
- Labels: Electronic Emergencies; Schematic
- Members: Dale Feliciello; Mallory Yago; Michael Zodorozny

Crash Course in Science are an American post-punk band. The band was formed in 1979 in Philadelphia by Dale Feliciello, Mallory Yago and Michael Zodorozny. They avoided the sounds of conventional instrumentation by using toy instruments and kitchen appliances to augment distorted guitar, drums and synthesised beats. The band reformed in 2009.

== History ==
Crash Course in Science were championed by local radio station WXPN DJ Lee Paris. Paris released their first single Cakes in the Home for his Go Go label. This was followed by Signals from Pier Thirteen EP in 1981, produced by John Wicks at Third Story Recordings.

In the years following the band's initial break-up, Crash Course in Science's music developed a cult following among techno and electro musicians, and the band have been cited as an influence on the 2000s electroclash scene. In 2009, they reunited for tours, and in 2011, Schematic Records released a Signals from Pier Thirteen re-issue, as well as Near Marineland, an album originally recorded by the band in 1981 before being shelved. In 2017, the band released a new album titled Situational Awareness.

== Discography ==
=== Albums ===
- Near Marineland (2011)
- Situational Awareness (2017)

=== EPs ===
- Signals from Pier Thirteen (1981)

=== Singles ===
- Cakes in the Home (1979)
