= Hearts of Darknesses =

Electronic music producer

- Years active: 2002–present
- Labels: Schematic Music Company, Asphodel Records, Deleted Art, Zod
- Members: Frank Musarra
- Website: www.heartsofdarknesses.es

Hearts of Darknesses is the solo project of IDM producer Frank Musarra. Musarra is a longtime studio collaborator with Gregg Gillis, both as a producer/engineer in the project Girl Talk and as a producer/artist in their remix collective Trey Told 'Em. However, Musarra's music has been described as the "mirror opposite" of Girl Talk's, and his concert performances as "a punk-rock version of Girl Talk's proscenium-stage radio-rock."

== Albums ==
- "Skip Found Teli & M-Pi / Hearts Of Darknesses" split 12" (Zod Records, 2003)
- "Music for Drunk Driving" (Schematic / Asphodel, 2003)
- "Shit Fan Punx Get Busted" (Deleted Art, 2009)
