= Unstoppable (Girl Talk album) =

Studio album by Girl Talk
- Released: April 6, 2004
- Genre: Mashup; glitch
- Length: 35:28
- Label: Illegal Art
- Producer: Gregg Gillis

Girl Talk chronology
Secret Diary (2002)	Unstoppable (2004)	Stop Cleveland Hate (2004)

Professional ratings
Review scores
Source	Rating
AllMusic	3.5/5 stars
Tiny Mix Tapes	4.5/5

Unstoppable is the second studio album by American musician Gregg Gillis, released under his stage name Girl Talk on April 6, 2004, by Illegal Art. Like Girl Talk's other releases on the label, Unstoppable was made available for purchase on the Illegal Art website through a "pay what you want" pricing system.

The album placed at numbers 179 and 18 on CMJ's Top 200 and RPM Albums college radio airplay charts.

== Background ==
Gillis stated that with Unstoppable, "the idea was to make more original sounding hip hop type music and pop music out of samples and having some blatant samples. It was obviously more party oriented, something you could jam out to." Mark Richardson of Pitchfork notes that Unstoppable and its predecessor Secret Diary are "far noisier and much more abstract" than his subsequent releases. Gillis' production on these releases is primarily a mixture of glitch beats and samples of pop hits, but Unstoppable marks a turn towards a more "pop-oriented and accessible" approach characterized as "far more direct, using fewer and longer samples to create more recognizable mash-ups in the manner of early KLF singles".

== Track listing ==
1. "All Eyes on Me" – 5:08
2. "Non-Stop Party Now" – 4:03
3. "Touch 2 Feel" – 3:38
4. "Pump It Up" – 0:47
5. "Bang This in the Club" – 3:06
6. "Bodies Hit the Floor" – 3:27
7. "The Feeling" – 0:48
8. "Happen" (featuring Chris Glover) – 2:58
9. "Cleveland, Shake" – 4:21
10. "Keeping the Beat" – 1:58
11. "Step to It" – 1:04
12. "Can't Stop" – 4:12
