= San Francisco Film Critics Circle Awards 2012 =

Annual US film awards ceremony

11th SFFCC Awards

December 17, 2012

Best Picture:
The Master

The 11th San Francisco Film Critics Circle Awards, honoring the best in film for 2012, were given on 17 December 2012.

== Winners ==
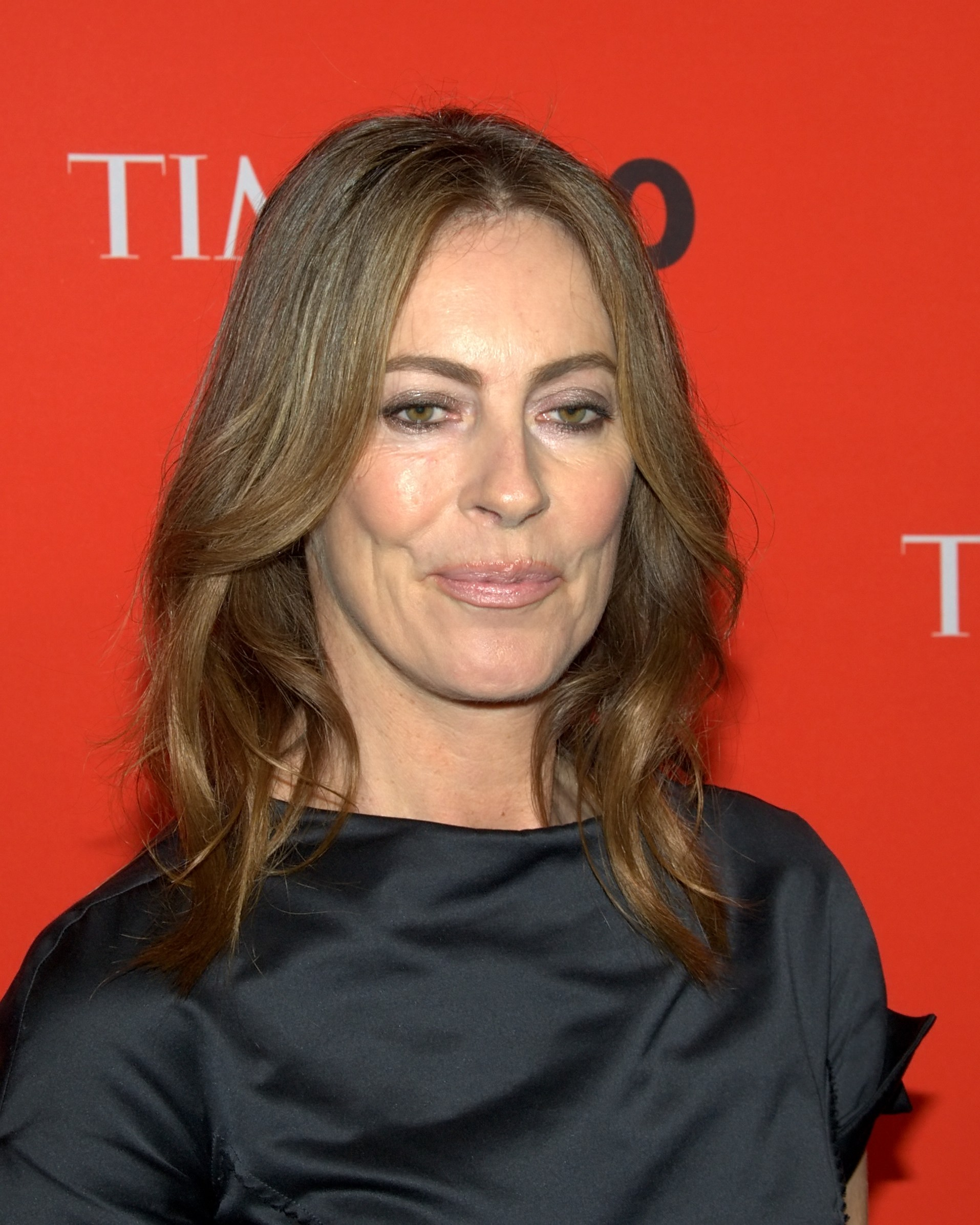
Kathryn Bigelow, Best Director winner

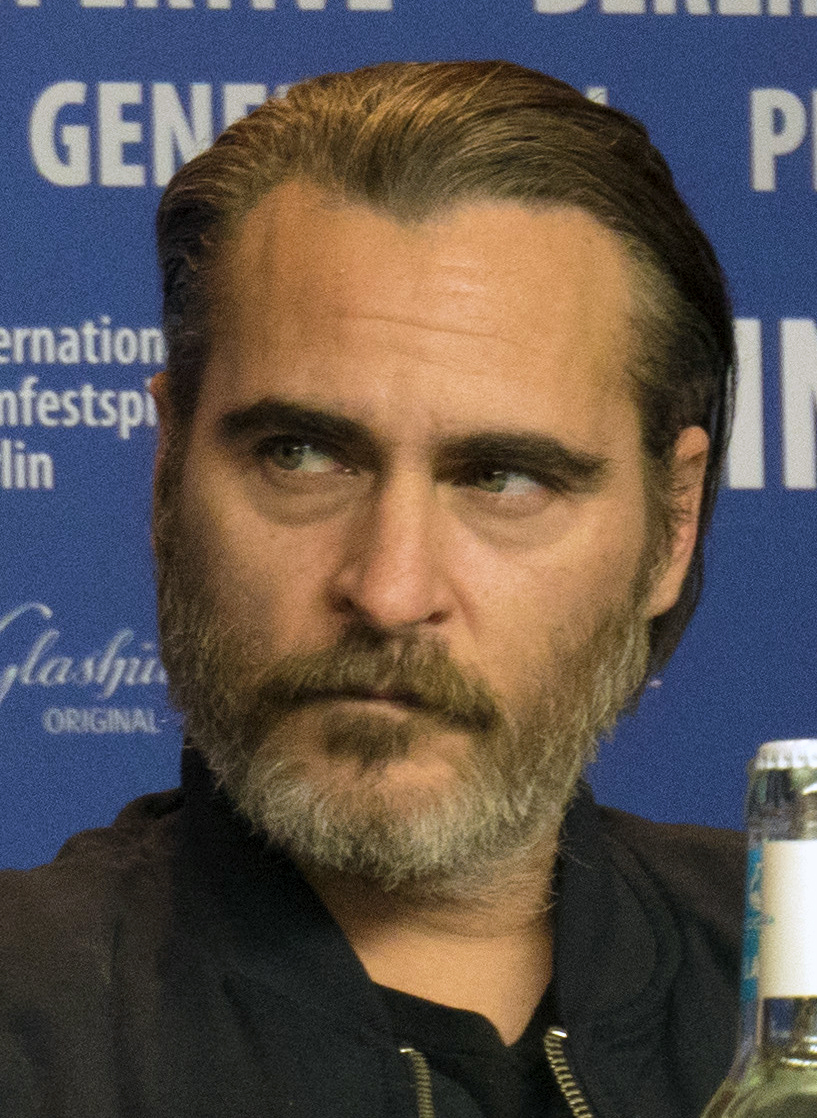
Joaquin Phoenix, Best Actor winner

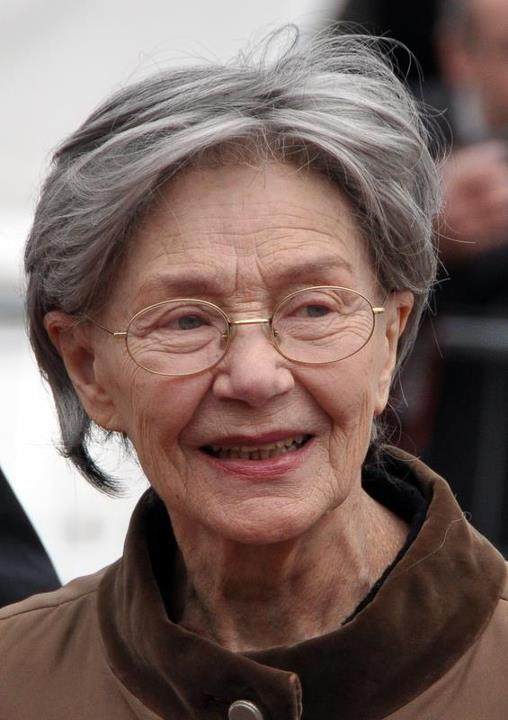
Emmanuelle Riva, Best Actress winner

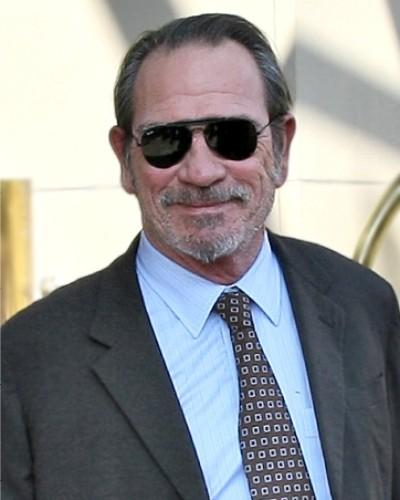
Tommy Lee Jones, Best Supporting Actor winner

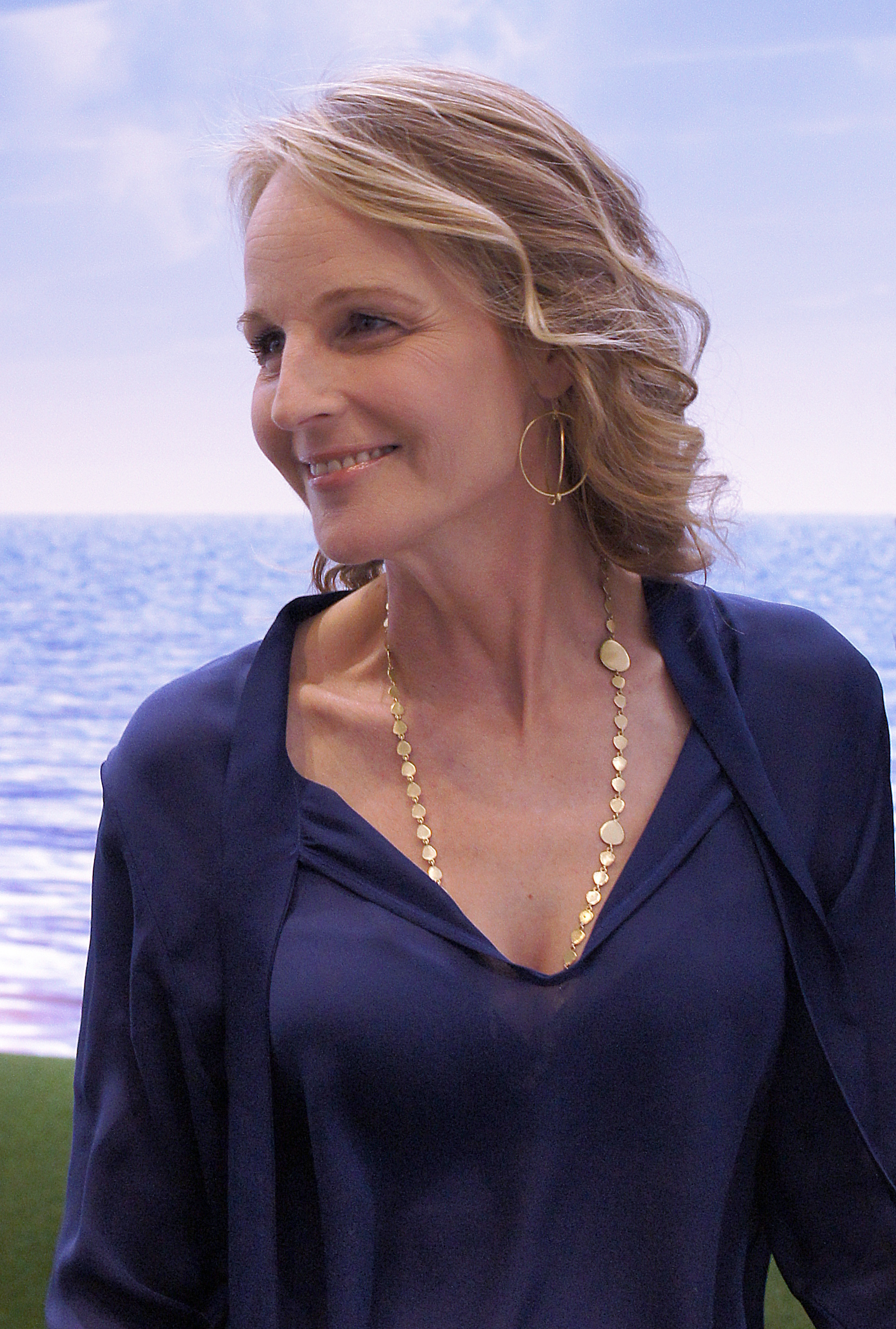
Helen Hunt, Best Supporting Actress winner

- Best Picture:
  - The Master
- Best Director:
  - Kathryn Bigelow – Zero Dark Thirty
- Best Original Screenplay:
  - Zero Dark Thirty – Mark Boal
- Best Adapted Screenplay:
  - Lincoln – Tony Kushner
- Best Actor:
  - Joaquin Phoenix – The Master
- Best Actress:
  - Emmanuelle Riva – Amour
- Best Supporting Actor:
  - Tommy Lee Jones – Lincoln
- Best Supporting Actress:
  - Helen Hunt – The Sessions
- Best Animated Feature:
  - ParaNorman
- Best Foreign Language Film:
  - Amour • Austria / France / Germany
- Best Documentary:
  - The Waiting Room
- Best Cinematography:
  - Life of Pi – Claudio Miranda
- Best Film Editing:
  - Argo – William Goldenberg
- Best Production Design:
  - Moonrise Kingdom – Adam Stockhausen
- Marlon Riggs Award (for courage & vision in the Bay Area film community):
  - Peter Nicks – The Waiting Room
- Special Citation (for under-appreciated independent cinema):
  - Girl Walk//All Day
