= The Bran Flakes =

Canadian-American indie pop group

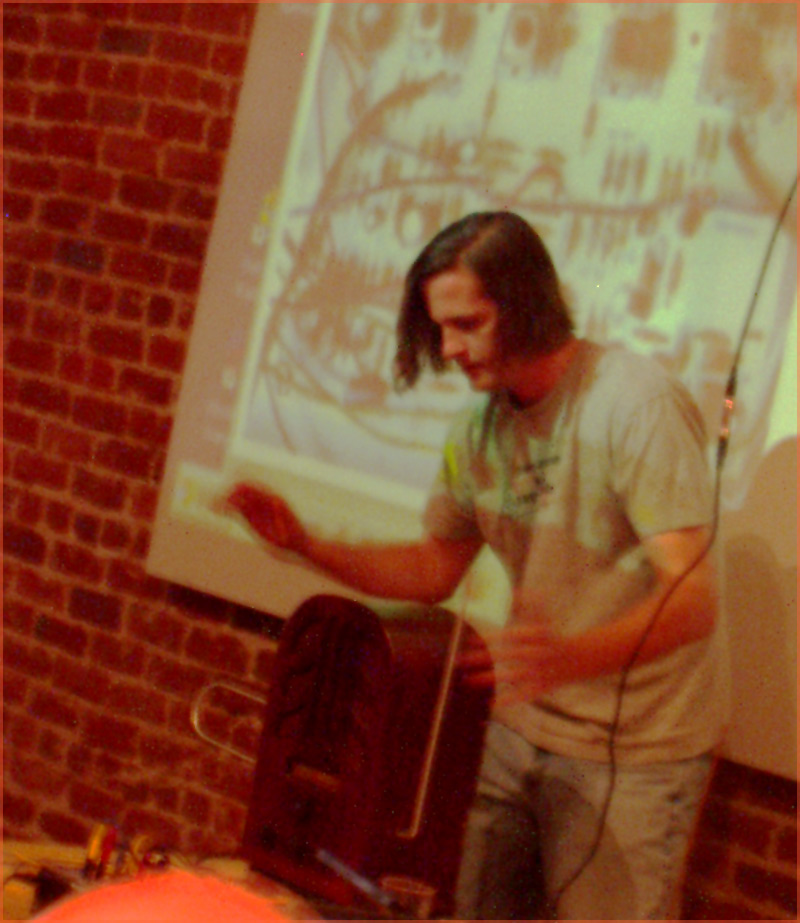
- Otis Fodder in 2005

Background information
- Origin: Seattle, Washington
- Genres: Indie pop; sound collage
- Years active: 1992–present
- Labels: Ovenguard Music; Lomo; Happi Tyme; Illegal Art; Future Logic Development Corporation
- Members: Otis Fodder; Mildred Pitt; (see Personnel section for others)
- Website: thebranflakes.com

The Bran Flakes are a Canadian-American indie pop group formed in Seattle in 1992. The group, whose line-up comprises Otis Fodder from Montreal, Quebec, and Mildred Pitt from Seattle, Washington, specializes in creating sound collages from pre-existing sources. Until 1997, they recorded on 4-track in bedrooms and did not play any shows, putting out hand dubbed cassette tapes and distributing tapes through direct mail-order, zines and indie catalogs.

== Career ==
The Bran Flakes make extensive use of sampling, recontextualizing the samples into new works, often resulting in ironic statements about modern pop and media culture. The group scours thrift shops for obscure and quirky LPs; some of their songs also make use of recognizably famous basslines, television shows, and soundtracks from video games. The unauthorized nature of such sampling has prevented much of the band's work from official commercial release. However, they did contribute six tracks to the fully authorized Raymond Scott Rewired, an album of Scott remixes (including tracks by The Evolution Control Committee and Go Home Productions) which was released in February 2014 on the Basta label.

Following the 1998 release of I Remember When I Break Down on Ovenguard Music, on which Otis Fodder was sole writer, the group's first album as a duo (Otis Fodder and Mildred Pitt) was in 1999, with Hey Won't Somebody Come and Play on Ovenguard Music. I Don't Have a Friend was released in 2001 on Lomo Records. Their 2002 album Bounces! was released on the band's own Happi Tyme Records, and contained one of their most popular songs; "Good Times a Goo Goo", which sampled extensively from Kermit the Frog and Fozzie Bear's performance of "Moving Right Along" from The Muppet Movie.

In 2008 the band signed with the label Illegal Art, known for such acts as Girl Talk and Steinski.

== Band members ==
Principal members

- Otis Fodder (1992–present)
- Mildred Pitt (1999–present)

Live show members

- Courtney Barnebey (1998–2012)
- Peter Lynch (1998–2012)
- Julie Alpert (1998–2012)
- Joanna Barnebey (1998–2012)
- Pam Landinez (1998–2012)

== Discography ==
The Bran Flakes have a discography consisting of seven studio albums, one remix album, one compilation album and two singles.

=== Studio albums ===
List of studio albums, with details
Title	Details
I Remember When I Break Down	Released: 1998; Label: Ovenguard Music; Format: CD-R
Hey Won't Somebody Come and Play?	Released: 1999; Label: Ovenguard Music/Happi Tyme; Format: CD-R, CD, Digital download
I Don't Have a Friend	Released: February 1, 2001; Label: Lomo; Format: CD, Digital download
Bounces!	Released: July 15, 2002; Label: Happi Tyme; Format: CD, Digital download
Bubbles	Released: 2007; Label: Happi Tyme; Format: Digital download
I Have Hands	Released: February 24, 2009; Label: Illegal Art; Format: CD, Digital download
Help Me	Released: August 1, 2017; Label: Happi Tyme; Format: Digital download

=== Remix albums ===
List of remix albums, with details
Title	Details
Raymond Scott Rewired (with the Evolution Control Committee and Go Home Productions)	Released: February 18, 2014; Label: Basta; Format: CD, Digital download

=== Compilation albums ===
List of compilation albums, with details
Title	Details
Ultimate Hits	Released: January 26, 2016; Label: Future Logic Development Corporation; Format: LP

=== Singles ===
List of singles, showing year released and album name
Title	Year	Album
"Holiday Single"	2009	Non-album singles
"I'm so Glad to See You"	2020	Non-album singles

== Live performances ==
1998

- Omnimedia V0.3 (January 24)
- Church of the Subgenius Devival (March 14–15)
- Coffee Messiah (May 2)
- Omnimedia V0.5 (October 17–18)

1999

- Meet the Sonicabal (February 20)
- Electromuse2 Festival (May 14–21)
- Art's Edge Festival (June 27)

2000

- Sonicabal 2 Showcase (September 23)
- Halloween Fright Night (October 31)

2001

- I Don't Have a Friend Release Party (May 24)
- 7th Annual Olympia Experimental Music Festival (June 16)
- Nova Nights Freak Out Party (October 25)

2002

- Bounces! Release Party (November 6)
- Sonarchy (November 16)

2003

- Nerd Rock (February 3)

2004

- I.D.E.A.L. Festival (March 6)

2005

- Brides of Frankenstein (August 6)

2009

- Sepomana Festival (April 18)

2011

- Convergence Festival (September 4)

2012

- ONN/OF Festival (January 28)
