= Eerie Materials =

- Parent company: 1990
- Country of origin: United States

Eerie Materials was an independent record label started in the early 1990s, first based in Richmond, Virginia, and later in San Francisco, California.

== History ==
Before the label began, in the late 1980s, brother and sister Troy Fiscella and Tristana Fiscella, along with their friends Mark, Frances, and Scott H., formed the band Eeyore Power Tool (which went by various names depending on the release, examples are "Eeyore Fiend Magnet", "Eeyore Prayer Tool", and "Eeyore Crypt Orchid", among many others). They became an important influence in the cassette culture of the time, and formed several other interesting musical projects, including Cave Clown Microwave (which included contributions from the people of Wheelchair Full of Old Men, Thought Balloon Tapes, Nauscopy, and many others); and Kingdom Scum, who later had LPs and CDs not only on Eerie Materials but on Staalplaat and Turn of the Century as well.

Releases by Eeyore Power Tool included a split 7-inch with Sockeye, another one with Caroliner, and an LP with hand-decorated covers. There was also a remarkable video release, "Eeyore Grumpy Ghoul: Scenese From the 1902 Virgin Scary Tour" (where "1902" was their way of saying "1992").

Other bands on the Eerie roster included Negativland, Evolution Control Committee, Faxed Head, Brown Cuts Neighbors, and Hemorrhoy Rogers and the Rrhoid Boyz.

== Legal Trouble ==
In 2000, the label released a 7-inch by the Evolution Control Committee called "Rocked By Rape", a criticism and parody of violence on television which used words spoken by Dan Rather and sampled music from AC/DC. CBS threatened legal action against Eerie Materials on the grounds of copyright infringement. This threat outraged members of the Evolution Control Committee as well as Negativland. Nevertheless, Eerie discontinued further sales of the record and no further legal action was taken.

== Artists (partial list) ==
- Anachronauts
- Breathilizor
- Brown Cuts Neighbors
- Caroliner
- Cave Clown Microwave
- Colon On The Cob
- Dum Dum TV
- ENE
- Evolution Control Committee
- Eeyore Gorilla Cookies
- Faxed Head
- Friendly
- Gang of Pork
- Hemorrhoy Rogers more info on Hemorrhoy here: http://pingpongdingdong.com/
- Kingdom Scum
- Negativland
- Nudibranch
- Sludgecrypt
- Sockeye
- Sonique Rabbit Fists
- Teenage Larvae
- The Popsicle Melts

== See also ==
- List of record labels
