= Secret Diary =

Studio album by Girl Talk
- Released: 2002
- Genre: Mashup; glitch; noise; avant-garde
- Length: 39:45
- Label: Illegal Art
- Producer: Gregg Gillis

Girl Talk chronology
Secret Diary (2002)	Unstoppable (2004)

Professional ratings
Review scores
Source	Rating
AllMusic	3/5 stars

Secret Diary is the debut studio album by American musician Girl Talk, released in 2002 on Illegal Art. The album was later made available for purchase through a "pay what you want" pricing system on Illegal Art's website.

== Track listing ==
1. "Let's Start This Party Right" – 2:26
2. "I Want You Back" – 3:27
3. "Ffun Haave To" – 5:12
4. "What If..." – 4:22
5. "Time to Get Glamorous" – 4:51
6. "Unicorn vs. Gravity" – 2:16
7. "The Right Stuff" – 5:48
8. "Fun in the Sun" – 3:44
9. "Jumpin(g)" – 3:23
10. "Friends 4Ever" (featuring Matt Wellins) – 4:14
