= Lloyd Dunn =

American mixed-media artist and magazine publisher

Lloyd John Dunn
- Born: November 10, 1957 (age 68); Harlan, Iowa, U.S.
- Education: University of Iowa
- Known for: Sound art

Lloyd John Dunn (born November 10, 1957, in Harlan, Iowa, US) is a founding member of the mixed-media and experimental sound art group the Tape-beatles and founder, publisher and editor of several small-press magazines, such as PhotoStatic and Retrofuturism. Since the early 1980s, he has been making work for a variety of media, including film, video, audio, print, and the web.

At the University of Iowa, Iowa City, US, he studied Linguistics (BA 1981), before going on to graduate school in Film, Photography and Intermedia (MFA 1987). While in graduate school, Dunn created an extensive body of work using the photocopier as his primary tool.

Dunn’s first major project was PhotoStatic Magazine begun in Iowa City in 1983. Although initiated to showcase photocopy and generative art, it quickly took root in the ‘mail art’ and ‘zine’ sub-cultures that peaked in the late 1980s. PhotoStatic began as a largely visual publication, but evolved continually, eventually coming to contain a mixture of graphics and essays, humor, and zine criticism.

Spin-offs from the Photostatic project included a series of audio cassette compilations, a video tape compilation, and a series of artist's books by individual artists, edited and produced by Dunn. Photostatic also appeared under a number of print "alter-egos", which include Retrofuturism, YAWN, The Bulletin of the Copyright Violation Squad, The Expatriot, PSRF, and most recently, The Photostatic Magazine Retrograde Archive.

In 1986, Dunn began composing music and audio art with Ralph Johnson and John Heck. From this activity they formed the group The Tape-beatles (official web site). The idea behind the collaboration was to create music using recording technology itself as the sole musical instrument. They took their inspiration from musique concrète, fluxus, and some of the studio experiments of the 1960s carried out by The Beatles and certain other more 'experimental' rock groups. The do-it-yourself esthetic of punk and the zine movement was also a decisive influence. Together with other members of the Tape-beatles, Dunn appears in a videotaped interview in the 1995 Craig Baldwin film, Sonic Outlaws.

In 2008, a major retrospective of the Photostatic Magazine Retrograde Archive took place in Dortmund, Germany at Phoenixhalle - HMKV as part of a group exhibition showcasing works that raise issues about intellectual property and copyright, entitled "Anna Kournikova Deleted By Memeright Trusted System".

Dunn launched a series of filecasts at the site nula.cc in June 2009. The filecasts consist of audio and video programs that use found material, field recordings, original work, and other material assembled together in collage fashion, and offered as downloadable files on no fixed schedule.
