= Trey Told 'Em =

American music project

- Origin: Pittsburgh, Pennsylvania and Brooklyn, New York; United States
- Years active: 2007–present
- Members: Gregg Gillis; Frank Musarra
- Website: http://www.treytoldem.com

Trey Told 'Em is a collaborative project between Gregg Gillis of Girl Talk and Frank Musarra of Hearts of Darknesses focused on "remix and production work."

== Remixes ==
- Tokyo Police Club - "Cheer It On" (2007) (samples Carl Carlton's "She's a Bad Mama Jama (She's Built, She's Stacked)", UGK's "Hit the Block" and Kool & the Gang's "Celebration")
- Simian Mobile Disco - "I Believe" (2007) (samples Rihanna's "Umbrella" and Rob Thomas's "Lonely No More")
- Professor Murder - "Dutch Hex" (2007) (samples Beyoncé's "Get Me Bodied" and Michael Jackson's "Stranger in Moscow")
- Of Montreal - "Gronlandic Edit" (2007) (unreleased, but featured on a mix on XM Radio) (samples Dr. Hook's "Sexy Eyes")
- Cardboard Records (Love and Circuits compilation) - "All Of The Other Songs Remixed" (2007)
- Thrill Jockey Records - "Super Epic Thrill Jockey Mega Massive Anniversary Mix" (2007)
- Kings of Leon - (2009) (unreleased)
- Kesha - "Tik Tok" (2010)
- Isabella Clarke - "Speak Up" (2017)
