= Plagiarhythm Nation =

Studio album by Evolution Control Committee
- Released: April 15, 2003
- Genre: Experimental rock
- Length: 52:17
- Label: Seeland Records

Evolution Control Committee chronology
| Double the Phat and Still Tasteless (1994) | Plagiarhythm Nation (2003) | All Rights Reserved (2010) |

Plagiarhythm Nation, sometimes stylized as Plagiarhythm Nation, Vol 2.0, is the second full-length album by Mark Gunderson's experimental music project The Evolution Control Committee. It was released on Seeland Records on April 15, 2003.

== Legal controversy ==
The album's fifth track, "Rocked by Rape", which combines clips from Dan Rather's television news broadcasts with AC/DC's song Back in Black, attracted considerable attention, both positive and negative. The song was originally released as a single in 1999, after which Spin gave it a provocative and favorable review, describing it as "a wicked language poem, backed by an endless AC/DC drone." It was also reviewed favorably by CMJ's Douglas Wolk, who praised it as a "stroke of genius". CBS later sent a cease-and-desist letter to Gunderson accusing him of copyright infringement in producing "Rocked by Rape", to which he replied that the song was a parody and therefore compliant with US copyright law. In spite of CBS attempting to limit the song's popularity with their letter to Gunderson, the song became considerably more popular than it previously was, with the song being played by NPR's All Things Considered program in 2000. Also in 2000, ECC themselves posted copies of the song online, disguising them to look like unreleased tracks by famous artists.

== Critical reception ==
Professional ratings
Review scores
| Source | Rating |
|---|---|
| Allmusic | 4/5 stars |
| Citypages | (positive) |
| Entertainment Weekly | B |
| Pitchfork Media | (3.2/10) |
| Robert Christgau | (choice cut) |

Plagiarhythm Nation received mixed reviews from critics. Sean Carruthers of AllMusic gave it four out of five stars and described it generally favorably, likening it to a greatest-hits collection; but he also wrote that "There are a few rough patches," citing "Fearsome as Odd Danger" and "Nasha" as examples. Robert Christgau gave the album a "choice cut" rating (which corresponds to a bad album with one or more good songs), identifying "The Fucking Moon" and "Rocked by Rape" as the only good songs on the album. Will Hermes of Entertainment Weekly gave the album a B grade and wrote that it "turns garage-sale detritus, voice-mail jabber, and pop shrapnel into a musical comedy record where the absurd and the sophomoric duke it out."

== Track listing ==
1. Star Spangled Bologna 1:18
2. The Fucking Moon 1:57
3. Hello 0:16
4. I Want A Cookie 3:40
5. Rocked By Rape 4:28
6. Spandau Filet 1:31
7. Don't Miss The Great Snatch 4:19
8. Breakfast 0:43
9. Donations #1 1:35
10. Toot 0:30
11. Nearly No Time For Yes 0:44
12. No Time For Yes 3:04
13. Lunch 0:45
14. Donations #2 1:28
15. 5000 Bc 0:37
16. Arrhythmic Nation 1:19
17. The Big Noodle Song 0:38
18. Prick 0:18
19. Sex Re-Education 2:21
20. Dinner 1:00
21. Donations #3 1:23
22. Candy Wrapper 1:36
23. Fearsome As Odd Danger 7:30
24. Arrhythmia's Gonna Get You 0:59
25. I Don't Care 1:21
26. Nasha 5:08
27. Dedication 0:08
28. The Christmas Wrong 1:31
29. Goodbye 0:10
