= Richard Devine =

American musical artist

- Also known as: Trapazoid; Trapezoid
- Born: Richard Coleman Devine
- Origin: Atlanta, Georgia, United States
- Genres: Glitch; IDM; experimental
- Occupation: Record producer
- Instruments: Synthesizer; software synthesizer; computer
- Years active: 1995–present
- Labels: Detroit Underground; Schematic; Sublight; Tape; Timesig; Warp
- Website: www.devinesound.net

Richard Devine is an American electronic musician and sound designer based in Atlanta. He is recognized for producing a layered and heavily processed sound, combining influences from glitch music to old and modern electronic music. Devine largely records for the Miami-based Schematic Records, which was founded by Josh Kay of Phoenecia. He has also done extensive recording and sample work with Josh Kay under the name DEVSND. As a result of praise of his music from Autechre as well as a remix of Aphex Twin's "Come to Daddy", Devine recorded an album for Warp Records which was jointly released by Schematic and Warp.

== Biography ==
Devine first started using computers for composition around 1993. Don Hassler, an instructor at the Atlanta College of Art, got him interested in computer synthesis, introducing Devine to Csound and other powerful computer-based applications. Devine coded his own FFT applications in SuperCollider, an environment and programming language for real-time audio synthesis. He would create SynthDefs using numerous unit and envelope generators, implement exponential ranges of frequential values (micro-tones) and utilize multichannel expansion. He would also use PBinds to modulate these synths to precise rhythmic patterns. “It's interesting, because you're doing things to sound that just aren't physically possible.” Devine possesses a plethora of digital audio workstations, gear, and numerous other instruments. This may have been an aid to achieving his peculiar, idiosyncratic sound, and implementing such sophisticated components and layers.

Devine also uses Native Instruments (NI) software and has used Propellerhead ReBirth RB-338 and Reason. His favorite NI applications are Reaktor and Absynth. Devine has designed sound patches for Propellerhead's Reason, NI’s Absynth, Reaktor, Battery and Massive, along with providing sound patches to Moog Music's award-winning Animoog app. As a sound designer, he collaborated with electronic musician BT in the film Look. He has also scored commercials for Nike, Touchstone Pictures and engineered and performed his own music worldwide.

Though he has contributed sound design to a number of hardware and software manufacturers, he recently released his first official sample library through Sony Creative Software entitled "The Electronic Music Manuscript: A Richard Devine Collection".

Devine also released Lipswitch (2000), Aleamapper (2001), Asect:Dsect (2003), Cautella (2005), RISP (2012), and Sort\Lave (2018).

== Discography ==
=== Studio albums ===
Title	Album details
Sculpt	Released: 1995; Label: Tape
Lipswitch	Released: 2000; Labels: Schematic, Warp
Aleamapper	Released: 2001; Label: Schematic
Asect:Dsect	Released: 2003; Label: Schematic
Cautella	Released: 2005; Label: Sublight
RISP	Released: 2012; Label: Detroit Underground
Sort\Lave	Released: 2018; Label: Timesig

=== EPs ===
Title	Details
Richard Coleman Devine EP	Released: 1997; Label: Schematic
Divine Edgar EP (with Jimmy Edgar)	Released: 2008; Label: Detroit Underground
Systik	Released: 2020; Label: BLK_Noise
