= The Evolution Control Committee =

Experimental music band

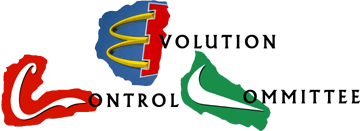
The ECC Logo.

The Evolution Control Committee (The ECC) is an experimental music band based in Columbus, Ohio. The ECC was founded by Mark Gunderson (a.k.a. TradeMark G.) in Columbus in 1986. They create music that falls within the borders of the sound collage genre, typically using uncleared and illegal samples from various sources as a form of protest against copyright law. The ECC also produces numerous audio experiments that goes outside regular composition methods, including the disfiguring of compact discs in a live performance known as "CDestruction". They have produced a few video works as well, ranging from re-edited 50's corporate shorts to Teddy Ruxpin reciting the works of William S. Burroughs. Other activities include culture jamming.

They are one of the pioneers of the mash-up or bootleg, where two or more songs are mixed together into a new track. According to Neil Strauss in The New York Times, "...many musical observers trace the official beginnings of the British bootleg scene to The Evolution Control Committee, which in 1993 mixed a Public Enemy a cappella with music by Herb Alpert." These are the now-classic "Public Enemy/Whipped Cream Mixes" containing Public Enemy's inflammatory raps titled "By the Time I Get To Arizona" and "Rebel Without a Pause" overdubbed onto instrumentals by Herb Alpert and the Tijuana Brass.

The ECC wrote "Rocked by Rape," consisting of samples of Dan Rather's deadpan delivery describing various atrocities over looped riffs from AC/DC's "Back in Black." This work brought legal threats against The ECC by CBS, but by 2003, CBS appeared to have dropped the issue. "Rocked by Rape" was nationally broadcast on NPR's All Things Considered in 2000. It was even played at a roast for Rather, later broadcast on C-SPAN.

Since 2000, Gunderson has performed his works on stage through an electronic instrument of his own invention: "The Thimbletron." It is made of a pair of gloves with ten thimbles attached at the ends of the fingers that are then wired to a laptop computer. As the thimbles are touched together, the laptop in turn plays a different sound sample. Gunderson claims that the device uses "thimbletronium energy" and warns that "thimbletronic radiation can leak unexpectedly due to a mishap during a live performance. The audience is advised to attend Thimbletron performances at their own risk." Gunderson has also modified a bread toaster in a similar fashion, with each depression of a lever playing a sample.

The Thimbletron has been largely retired in public performances in favor of the Wheel of Mashup in which audience members come up on stage and spin a wheel to randomly select the music and vocals to be combined. These are then mashed together in real time using the VidiMasher 3000, a large rear-projected touch screen used to control Ableton Live. VidiMasher 3000 (Video Mashup Screen) Demo

== Discography ==
- Jesu Boy of Man's Desiring (Self Release)
  Audio cassette featuring early cut-ups.
- Buddha Bleach (Self Release on Def Clam Tapes, Dec. 1990)
  Audio cassette featuring early cut-ups.
- The Last Mall (Self Release)
  Audio cassette featuring loops and crank phone calls. Packaged in a "Lazarusears" shopping bag.
- Big Wyoming (Self Release)
  Audio cassette featuring travelogue of a Gunderson family ski vacation accompanied by Casio. Packaged in postcards.
- Gunderphonic (Self Release, 1994 ECC -=- The Virtual Gunderphone)
  Audio cassette inspired by John Oswald's Plunderphonics. Features cut-ups, including the well known Whipped Cream mixes and two "corrected" Gulf War speeches by George H. W. Bush. The audio cassette is packaged inside of an old 8-track cassette.
- Double the Phat and Still Tasteless (Released on Eerie Materials)
  CD featuring cut-ups and electronica, as well as absurdist humor skits and guest performances. A 5.25 inch floppy disc is slit along one side and the CD is slipped inside.
- Plagiarhythm Nation (Released on Seeland Records)
  CD featuring cut-ups and electronica.
- The Whipped Cream Mixes (Released on Eerie Materials/Pickled Egg)
  Vinyl 45. Side A - Rebel Without A Pause. Side B - By The Time I Get to Arizona.
- Unreleased Ambient Works (Self Released)
  CD featuring dark atmospheric/illbient works.
- Rocked by Rape (Released on Eerie Materials)
  Vinyl 45.
- The Television Will Not Be Revolutionized (Self Released)
  VHS video cassette.
- Compact Discstructions (Self Released)
  A manual packaged with a random CD. The manual describes various ways to make a CD play incorrectly, and is intended ultimately to destroy the CD.
- Subliminal (self-released)
  Cassette featuring many layered subliminal self-help recordings. The website claims that side one "will increase your creativity, improve your employment, develop your ESP, help you stop smoking, and so on." While side two, being a reverse recording of the same, "will help you gain weight, get demoted, become stupid, etc." link
- Weapons of Ass Destruction (self-released)
  Full length album released online, available for download from the Sounds section of the ECC web site.
- All Rights Reserved (self-released)
  Full-length album released online Discography: ECC Media of the Past, Present, and Future; also available in LP and CD format.

== Related artists ==
Mark Gunderson also records as DJ Pantshead and performs with Cheese & Pants Theater, a comedy/performance art duo consisting of a giant pair of pants and a giant Parmesan cheese shaker who pantomime to bizarrely edited vintage audio and as DJ John Philip Suicide with Dub Assault. Past projects have included the experimental performance troupe Gaga, several ECC performances at the Columbus Avant Garage film festival, and a release with the Weird Love Makers. A present project is his webcast 'The Sound of Plaid' as Trademark G. at the Amsterdam-based international radio-art webstation DFM RTV INT, which airs two times each week.

Other related artists include The Bran Flakes, Emergency Broadcast Network, Escape Mechanism, Negativland, John Oswald, People Like Us and The Tape-beatles, Messer Für Frau Müller.

Greg Gillis, in interview outtakes for the movie RIP: A Remix Manifesto, admits that Evolution Control Committee was a major influence and inspiration to create the mashups for his artistic persona Girl Talk. Gillis even explains that the best description of Girl Talk's music is "Plunderphonics."
