= Girl Walk // All Day =

2011 feature-length dance music video

- Directed by: Jacob Krupnick
- Produced by: Jacob Krupnick; Youngna Park; Sam Petersson
- Starring: Anne Marsen; Daisuke Omiya; John Doyle
- Cinematography: Jacob Krupnick
- Edited by: Jacob Krupnick
- Music by: Girl Talk
- Production company: Wild Combination
- Release date: December 8, 2011 (New York)
- Running time: 78 minutes
- Country: United States

Girl Walk // All Day (stylized as girl walk // all day) is a 2011 feature-length dance music video directed by Jacob Krupnick.

The film, which stars Anne Marsen as the Girl, Dai Omiya as the Gentleman, and John Clayton Doyle as the Creep, follows the Girl as she dances through New York City, set to the music of Girl Talk's 2010 album All Day.

After a short concept video went viral, the cost of producing Girl Walk // All Day was crowdfunded through Kickstarter. The full film was released online in 12 parts (corresponding with the 12 tracks of All Day) from November 2011 to January 2012. Additionally, the filmmakers held dance parties in conjunction with screenings around the world over the next several years. During its production and release, Girl Walk // All Day received acclaim and media attention, becoming the subject of multiple articles on the blog Gothamist, the website of The Atlantic, and articles in The Wall Street Journal and The New York Times.

== Production ==
=== Development ===
Jacob Krupnick was first introduced to Anne Marsen in the summer of 2009 while working on a video installation for a fashion show. Impressed with Marsen's skill and eclectic mix of dance styles, Krupnick and Marsen both were interested in working together again, showcasing her dancing by creating a much longer piece. After hearing the Girl Talk album All Day in late 2010, Krupnick quickly decided that the album was suitable for the project, saying "I knew I needed a piece of music that had an emotional arc to it, that had a story unto itself. At first listen, the album seemed like a godsend." Krupnick contacted Marsen and John Doyle, whom he had also met while filming the video installation, and pitched them on the idea of a feature-length music video of dancing across New York City.

In early January 2011, Krupnick, his wife, Marsen, Doyle, and dancer Daisuke Omiya filmed a dance sequence on the Staten Island Ferry. Krupnick had wanted the feature to be made very quickly and with a minimal budget and planning, but after the first day of filming it was decided that they should slow down. The Ferry dancing sequence was posted online on January 4, 2011. After several days, the sequence was shared in articles by Gothamist and The Huffington Post, soon becoming a viral video.

On January 28, 2011, a Kickstarter campaign was launched, with a goal of raising $4,800 (in addition to Krupnick's own money) to film the project in only six days in the spring and release the film during the summer. The funding goal was achieved in less than one week, and by the end of the campaign almost $25,000 was raised. During the campaign, and before filming of the feature began, Krupnick "learned how to operate a Steadicam, gathered supporters and resources, and worked with the dancers to refine the whole idea."

=== Filming ===
Before filming began in earnest, the film had a loose narrative involving the Girl working as a waitress before quitting and dancing across the city. This was revised to have the Girl leave a ballet class. The nature of the film changed during production, with Krupnick saying "As time went on, Girl Walk developed into a 20-page script with very precise reactions happening at specific moments in the music. This was helpful to have, though we deviated from it constantly. I relied on the dancers completely to establish their set of movements." With the exception of only a few scenes, most of the dancing was not choreographed. "Almost all the dance is improvised, although a lot of thought went into what the characters are trying to communicate, and the environment they're working in. ... I wanted the whole thing to feel very natural, with the dancers reacting to the world as it is."

I'm really drawn to dance as an expression of personal ecstasy. I'm more interested in how people feel when they're dancing than watching fantastic professional level dance. So something we wanted to encourage with the film is capturing that sense of personal release. Anne's training is diverse, it's professional, but I'm happy to have her dance be accessible and not too technical. There are whispers of her training throughout the film, but I also wanted it to be for people like me who just love really to shake it when they feel it.

— Jacob Krupnick

Besides the main cast, many additional dancers with diverse styles are featured, many of whom were found online. The use of modern, less-mainstream styles of dance, such as voguing, waacking, and parkour, were "tied to the notion that Anne [the Girl] is rebelling from the orthodoxy of ballet." In addition to testing if the music video format could hold audience attention for such a long period of time, Krupnick also sees Girl Walk // All Day as making a statement on how restricted he felt public space is in New York City, and to "make a case for people being able to do what they want in public space and defend what public space is." Krupnick said that, compared to other parts of the world, "I've felt how constricted public space has become here, and so I really want to make a film that, in a way, is a campaign for freedom of movement and freedom of experience." This idea of interacting with public space extended to the release, with the plan of showing the film in public spaces, at festivals, at parties, and more.

Because of the crowdfunding campaign and public interest in the project, the number of filming days increased from six to 45 over the course of three months, taking place at far more locations than had originally been intended. Despite this, the production had minimal resources available, and filming was challenging. Krupnick would listen to the album frequently to try to create the plot, while also traveling to locations with associate Sam Petersson. During filming, the crew tried to be as inconspicuous as possible to work easily and to avoid disruptions. While a small speaker was brought to set, it was quiet, and the dancers mostly had to rely on Krupnick beatboxing or singing, or have the music and story arc memorized for the dances. This was to avoid bothering bystanders and the police. The script for the film included cues for reaction shots, but it was decided to exclude these shots to focus on the dancers and the story. Additionally, the crew found it surprising how infrequently bystanders would react to the dancers or the filmmakers.

The production did not have permission to film at many of the locations, as well, causing some concern. The Staten Island Ferry sequence was reshot for the film, but, as the reshoot was filmed the day after the killing of Osama bin Laden, there was a large police presence on the Ferry. Additionally, while filming at Yankee Stadium, Marsen was escorted out by the police. One sequence was filmed at Zuccotti Park during the Occupy Wall Street protests. Photographer Bill Cunningham appears in the film, taking photos of the Creep. These photos would go on to be printed in a Sunday Styles section of The New York Times. The Central Park sequence near the end of the film used over 100 dancers. Rather than play the album while filming, the dancers were kept on time by a saxophonist playing in the same cadence as the album.

An update for Kickstarter backers on October 20, 2011, announced that filming had finished.

=== Post-production ===
During editing, clips of the dancing would frequently be moved out of sync to find better fits for movements to the music. Krupnick, who edited the film, said "I made several passes over the whole film, gradually shifting the dance moves so that they'd correspond to a rap lyric, or a beat, or a tonal shift in the music."

== Release ==
Before the film's completion, scenes were shown in June 2011 at the LOOK3 Festival in Charlottesville, Virginia, and dancers from the film performed at the 2011 Dia Art Foundation gala in early November 2011.

Girl Walk // All Day was first released from late November 2011 to early January 2012 in twelve chapters online. Starting on November 29, each chapter was promoted twice per week (every Tuesday and Friday) exclusively through Gothamist. Although the focus for the release was on live events, Krupnick wanted to release the film online because of what the film owes to the internet for its spread. The film was broken into chapters because of considerations of viewers' attention spans on the internet, because of "how difficult it is to presume how much people want to watch," as well as because the production team believed a serialized release "would be a fun way to keep people engaged." The full-length version of the film premiered at the Brooklyn Masonic Temple on December 8, 2011.

Over the following years, Girl Walk // All Day screened at various festivals and events, with the goal of creating dance parties around the world. The production team focused on encouraging live events around the film, sometimes traveling to different screenings, and even providing advice on setups for independent screenings. The film's official website had a page where fans could request a screening in their area, and the producers maintained a blog to track the production's progress and, later, screenings and event participation.

DVD's of the film were given to Kickstarter backers, as well as sold through the film's website briefly.

== Reception ==
Besides early publicity, Girl Walk // All Day would go on to receive acclaim in reviews from film publications, including Sight & Sound, The Hollywood Reporter, and a retrospective review from IndieWire in 2020.

Spin named the film the most innovative music video of 2011, with Phoebe Reilly writing that "director Jacob Krupnick honored the spirit of [Gregg] Gillis' All Day by capturing a completely instinctual desire to thrill to the sound."

Keith Uhlich of Time Out New York named Girl Walk // All Day the seventh-best film of 2012, calling it "exhilarating."

Girl Walk // All Day was awarded a Special Citation at the 11th San Francisco Film Critics Circle Awards in 2012, saying that the film is "a joyous celebration of music, dance and community."

=== Legacy ===
Anne Marsen danced onstage as part of Girl Talk's set at the 2014 Coachella Festival.

The Pharrell Williams single "Happy" was released in November 2013. The accompanying music video is 24-hours long, featuring Williams and others dancing around Los Angeles. Some drew connections between the film and the music video, including in articles from Slate and IndieWire. In April 2014, Jacob Krupnick and Anne Marsen responded, saying that they believed Girl Walk // All Day provided inspiration for the concept and some of the choreography of the "Happy" music video. Krupnick and Marsen say that they do not feel any ill will for the similarities between the film and the music video, with Krupnick expressing a desire to collaborate with Williams. Marsen added, "Yet at the same time we feel like we're not getting the recognition for this." Girl Talk stated that while he sees a resemblance between the film and the video, "It could be a coincidence or maybe somebody in Pharrell's camp was influenced by the video. Do I think the Pharrell video used those elements in a transformative nature and created something new out of it? Yes." A representative for Pharrell Williams claimed that the "Happy" video is not inspired by Girl Walk // All Day, and that Williams and the directors had not seen the film.

IndieWire named Girl Walk // All Day the 96th-best film of the 2010s, with writer David Ehrlich calling it "a visionary and euphoric work of lighting-in-a-bottle genius."
