= Full Court Press (album) =

Studio album by Girl Talk, Wiz Khalifa, Big K.R.I.T., and Smoke DZA
- Released: April 8, 2022
- Genre: Hip-hop
- Length: 31:19
- Labels: Asylum; Taylor Gang
- Producers: Girl Talk; Nile Rodgers

Girl Talk chronology
Broken Ankles (2014)	Full Court Press (2022)

Wiz Khalifa chronology
Stoner's Night (2022)	Full Court Press (2022)	Multiverse (2022)

Big K.R.I.T. chronology
Digital Roses Don't Die (2022)	Full Court Press (2022)	Dedícated to Cadalee Biarritz (2025)

Smoke DZA chronology
Driplomatic Immunity (2022)	Full Court Press (2022)	Respecanize Vol. 1 (2022)

Singles from Full Court Press
- 1. "Put You On" Released: March 9, 2022; 2. "How the Story Goes" Released: March 23, 2022; 3. "Ain't No Fun" Released: April 6, 2022

Full Court Press is a collaborative hip-hop album by American producer Girl Talk and rappers Wiz Khalifa, Big K.R.I.T., and Smoke DZA, released April 8, 2022 via Asylum Records and Taylor Gang Entertainment. Full Court Press is Girl Talk's first full album in over a decade, following 2010's All Day.

== Background ==
Three singles were released from the album: "Put You On" was released March 9 along with an animated music video directed by Lisa Ramsey. "How the Story Goes" released March 23, and "Ain't No Fun" came out April 6 with a music video. A video for "Season" directed by Slick Jackson was released December 2.

In discussing the recording process behind the album, Girl Talk said "These guys all go back with each other over 10 years, so it was just a great energy in the room", and that he "wanted to have an environment where they could do what they do best; try out a bunch of different ideas and have fun with it." He also noted the three have very different styles and "as a fan of each of them, I wanted to capture what it is that draws me to their music." The album was recorded over multiple days in a studio in Los Angeles. "How the Story Goes" started with Khalifa recording his verse, followed by K.R.I.T. building the rest of the song around that verse, "captur[ing] the feel of the sample and tak[ing] it somewhere new." For "Ain't No Fun", Girl Talk's philosophy was to make "a flip on the concept of Snoop's original, kind of from the female perspective of the titular line. I wanted to keep the production diverse throughout the project, while still maintaining a cohesive feel. This beat stands out in the context of the album because it doesn't have a sample and uses a more minimal style. But I thought that with some of the specific sound design and the overall energy, it really connected to the project as a whole."

Girl Talk had previously collaborated with all three artists separately, having produced Khalifa's 2017 song "Steam Room" which appeared on his Bong Rips EP the same year, DZA's 2018 track "The Hook Up" from his album Not for Sale, and the 2020 DZA track "Santos Party House", which featured Khalifa, K.R.I.T., and Currensy, and appeared on his album Homegrown.

== Reception ==
Full Court Press ratings
Review scores
Source	Rating
Pitchfork	6.9/10

HipHopDX's David Aaron Brake called the album "particularly unique given each of the different rappers' unique style", but that despite their differences "their distinct influences are blended seamlessly thanks to Girl Talk's thoughtful and soul-laden production." Pitchfork's Evan Rytlewski gave specific praise to Khalifa's performance, writing that while his "track record with albums is horrid ... as if the burden of carrying a full-length project sucks all the air out of him before he even arrives at the booth", "in short doses he's an absolute charisma machine, and with three co-headliners to help him carry the weight, he raps with uncharacteristic joviality." Rytlewski also praised Girl Talk's curatorial skills, noting that he "produces like his finger is always hovering over the skip button in case things ever get dull", but that "it's a credit to him that on Full Court Press they never do."

== Track listing ==
Full Court Press track listing
No.	Title	Length
1.	"Mind Blown"	3:36
2.	"Put You On"	2:56
3.	"Season"	3:07
4.	"How the Story Goes"	3:09
5.	"No Singles"	2:30
6.	"Ready for Love" (featuring Nile Rodgers)	3:14
7.	"Revenge of the Cool"	3:09
8.	"Ain't No Fun"	2:27
9.	"Fly the Coop"	3:19
10.	"Everyday" (featuring Currensy)	3:52
Total length:		31:19

== Personnel ==
- Girl Talk – producer
- Smoke DZA – vocals (1–3, 5, 7, 8, 10)
- Wiz Khalifa – vocals (1, 2, 4–6, 8, 10)
- Big K.R.I.T. – vocals (2, 4, 5, 7–10)
- Nile Rodgers – producer (6)
- Currensy – vocals (10)
- Colin Leonard – mastering engineer
- Frank Musarra – mastering engineer, mixing engineer
