= All Day (Girl Talk album) =

Studio album by Girl Talk
- Released: November 15, 2010
- Genre: Mash-up
- Label: Illegal Art
- Producer: Gregg Gillis

Girl Talk chronology
Feed the Animals (2008)	All Day (2010)	Broken Ankles (2014)

All Day is the fifth studio album by American musician Gregg Gillis, known by his stage name Girl Talk. The album was originally released as a free digital download by Illegal Art on November 15, 2010. Gillis composed the album using overlapping samples of 372 songs by other artists. All Day was released as one seamless 71-minute file and as 12 separate tracks, available in MP3 and FLAC. As with prior Girl Talk albums, the Illegal Art website states that All Day was "intended to be listened to as a whole," but was "broken up into individual tracks only for easier navigation."

Illegal Art later published a complete list of samples used on the album on their website. Other sources have created time listings to assist in studying the music. The album, segmented into twelve "episodes", is used as the soundtrack to the 2011 feature-length Jacob Krupnick dance video, Girl Walk All Day.

== Critical reception ==
Professional ratings
Aggregate scores
Source	Rating
AnyDecentMusic?	6.2/10
Metacritic	79/100
Review scores
Source	Rating
AllMusic	3.5/5 stars
Alternative Press	4/5 stars
The A.V. Club	B+
The Boston Phoenix	4/4 stars
MSN Music (Expert Witness)	A
Now	3/5
Paste	8.2/10
Pitchfork	8.3/10
Rolling Stone	3.5/5 stars
Slant Magazine	3/5 stars

All Day was well received by most music critics upon its release. On the review aggregate site Metacritic, the album has a score of 79 out of 100, indicating "Generally positive reviews."

The samples in the album were described as "instantly recognizable hooks". Reviewers frequently praised the innovation of the music style, saying that it is "like nothing you've ever heard", "[rehabilitation for] disposable pop", among those "tricks [that] just don't get old", with appeal "first for the sampled songs themselves, [and] second for the thrill of the novelty of early mash-ups", and that "the entire mega-mash-up is stupendously danceable".

== Track listing ==
1. "Oh No" – 5:39
2. "Let It Out" – 6:29
3. "That's Right" – 5:22
4. "Jump on Stage" – 6:22
5. "This Is the Remix" – 6:02
6. "On and On" – 5:09
7. "Get It Get It" – 5:33
8. "Down for the Count" – 6:37
9. "Make Me Wanna" – 6:23
10. "Steady Shock" – 5:47
11. "Triple Double" – 6:27
12. "Every Day" – 5:10
