= Jon Nelson (artist) =

American classical composer

Jon Nelson is a sound collage artist and hosts the program Some Assembly Required. He also produces Radio Retrofit as a series of creative fabrications, focusing on the art of personality driven radio, as represented by various fictional broadcasters, known from film and television. As an artist, he "mashes music and found sound — from old movies, laugh tracks, the news — to make what he calls the audio dreamscape of the media age." Nelson has been championing the genre of collage music since 1999; Some Assembly Required and Radio Retrofit are heard on the Sheena's Jungle Room stream, at WFMU.

== Reviews and articles ==
- The Art of Mashups By Tom Asbrook, On Point, February 5, 2009
- Jon Nelson of Escape Mechanism 23007 by Katya Tylevich A.V. Club Twin Cities, January 28, 2009
- Some Assembly Required: Mash-Up Pioneer Dreams in Soundbites By Elizabeth Held, Wired Magazine, December 22, 2008
- Escape Mechanism promotes recycling! by Max Ross, Secrets of the City, September 16, 2008
- Click, shriek, boom! Sonic collage artist Escape Mechanism cuts and pastes while aural trickster Lost in Translation slashes and burns by Michaelangelo MatosCity Pages (Volume 20 - Issue 949 - February 10, 1999)

== Discography ==
- Escape Mechanism Violence and Devotion (2018)
- Escape Mechanism (Emphasis Added) (2008)
- Cast of Thousands with Escape Mechanism Self Titled (2004)
- Escape Mechanism, Steev Hise, The Tape-beatles, Wobbly Minneapolis Summit (2002)
- Escape Mechanism Self Titled (1998)
