= P. Miles Bryson =

American musician (born 1964)

P. Miles Bryson (born August 1964) is an American musician who is residing in Arizona. He has released music on a variety of music labels such as Illegal Art, Self Abuse, genesungswerk, SSSM, Cynfeirdd, Anaemic Waves Factory, and 6 on the dot. Releases include Long Day's Tango Into Night and Alejandro's Carniceria.
