= Mashed (album) =

Compilation album
- Released: 12 February 2007
- Genre: Mashup
- Label: EMI
- Producers: Go Home Productions; Loo and Placido

Mashed is a compilation album released on EMI on 12 February 2007. It was one of the first fully legal mashup albums. Giles Harris was responsible for the album's concept, track listing, title as well as the laborious work involved in clearing each piece of music that featured on the album. Most of the tracks were produced by Mark Vidler aka Go Home Productions. "Boogie Oogie Music" and "Horny as a Dandy" were produced by Loo and Placido.

== Track listing ==
1. "Franz Buffalo" – Malcolm McLaren vs Franz Ferdinand (mashup of "Buffalo Gals" and "Take Me Out")
2. "Boogie Oogie Music" – Madonna vs A Taste of Honey ("Music" and "Boogie Oogie Oogie")
3. "Missing Groovejet" – Everything But The Girl vs Spiller ("Missing" and "Groovejet")
4. "Horny as a Dandy" – Mousse T vs The Dandy Warhols ("Horny '98" and "Bohemian Like You")
5. "David X" – David Bowie vs Liberty X ("Let's Dance" and "Got to Have Your Love")
6. "Passenger Fever" – Peggy Lee vs Iggy Pop ("The Passenger" and "Fever")
7. "Flashing for Money" – Deep Dish vs Dire Straits ("Flashdance (He's a Dream)" and "Money for Nothing")
8. "Can't Get Blue Monday out of My Head" – Kylie Minogue vs New Order ("Can't Get You Out of My Head" and "Blue Monday")
9. "Hella Lola" – No Doubt vs The Shapeshifters ("Hella Good" and "Lola's Theme")
10. "Doctor Pressure" – Mylo vs Miami Sound Machine ("Drop the Pressure" and "Dr. Beat")
11. "Proper Education" – Eric Prydz vs Floyd (remix of "Another Brick in the Wall, Part II")
12. "Rapture Riders" – Blondie vs The Doors ("Rapture" and "Riders on the Storm")
13. "Notorious Trick" – Duran Duran vs Kelis ("Notorious" and "Trick Me")
14. "Sing Back Connection" – Elastica vs Moloko ("Sing It Back" and "Connection")
