= Broken Ankles (EP) =

EP by Girl Talk and Freeway
- Released: April 8, 2014
- Recorded: 2013
- Genres: Mashup; hip-hop; electronic; dance
- Label: Girl Talk Music
- Producer: Girl Talk

Girl Talk chronology
All Day (2010)	Broken Ankles (2014)	Full Court Press (2022)

Freeway chronology
Highway Robbery (2014)	Broken Ankles (2014)	Free Will (2016)

Broken Ankles is an extended play by American rapper Freeway and American music producer and mashup musician Girl Talk, both of whom hail from Pennsylvania. It was released digitally on April 8, 2014.

== Background ==
Broken Ankles focuses more on traditional beats rather than the straight mash-ups of Girl Talk's previous work. Speaking about the release, he explained: "I had the idea to do a mixtape with someone, but have it flow like one of my albums. I wanted to do a mixtape that was pretty different from your average mixtape. Every song is connected and there's a very distinct beginning and end; it works as a whole."

Freeway was Girl Talk's first choice for a collaborator, as he had been a fan of the rapper ever since hearing his appearance on the Jay-Z song "1-900-Hustler" and felt that "his energy is unreal, and he's able to keep up with any production." The two communicated through phone calls and e-mails and recorded several songs in Philadelphia.

== Release ==
Girl Talk first announced the release of Broken Ankles through Twitter on October 6, 2013. Two days later, Girl Talk and Freeway debuted a song from the EP entitled "Tolerated" during a performance at the Brooklyn Bowl. The EP was originally set for a fall 2013 release through DatPiff, but the release was postponed to 2014 due to Girl Talk's desire to "[wait] on a few features from other artists before [settling] on a definitive date."

On March 25, 2014, Girl Talk announced that the video for "Tolerated", featuring Freeway and Waka Flocka Flame, would be released on March 31, and that Broken Ankles would be released on April 8. The music video, directed by Allen Cordell, features Girl Talk and Freeway walking down a street and brutally assaulting passers-by who bother them.

== Critical reception ==
Professional ratings
Review scores
Source	Rating
The Line of Best Fit	8/10
The Needle Drop	8/10
Pitchfork	7.4/10
PopMatters	7/10

Broken Ankles was well received by critics and was commended as "Freeway’s best solo project" in a review by Pitchfork. Reviewers praised Girl Talk's production, saying his "soulful sampling is perfected here" and "evokes some of the bombast and pageantry that made early 2000s Just Blaze so amazing." The samples in the EP "leaves you craving more" with its "hard-hitting" beats that "are a perfect compliment to Freeway's gritty, Philly cadence". The result is "a bracingly intense yet surprisingly harmonious EP that stuffs Girl Talk’s hyperactive beats under Freeway’s militantly growled rhymes".

== Track listing ==
1. "Broken Ankles Intro" – 0:34
2. "Tolerated" (featuring Waka Flocka Flame) – 3:15
3. "Tell Me Yeah" (featuring Young Chris) – 3:10
4. "I Can Hear Sweat" (featuring Jadakiss) – 4:32
5. "Suicide" – 3:20
6. "Lived It" – 3:43

== Personnel ==
- Freeway – vocals
- Gregg Gillis – music, production
- Jadakiss – featured vocals
- Waka Flocka Flame – featured vocals
- Young Chris – featured vocals
