= Schematic Records =

Independent electronic record label

- Founded: 1996
- Distributor: Forced Exposure
- Genre: Techno; Electronica; Various
- Country of origin: United States
- Official website: Schematic official website

Schematic Records is a record label founded by Josh Kay and Romulo Del Castillo as Schematic Music Company, an electronic music label specializing in techno, electronica and various forms of dance music.

== History ==
In 1995, Josh Kay and Romulo Del Castillo released a series of records for the US major label Astralwerks as a duo under the stage name Soul Oddity. After a dispute with Astralwerks, who were reluctant to release Soul Oddity's experimental productions, they formed Schematic Records in 1996. Schematic artist Otto Von Schirach explained:

The cool thing about Schematic, we could release whatever we wanted. Nowadays, labels are very picky about what they put out on vinyl or cd, what they invest in. We were lucky to come in at a time when we could release some of the weirdest shit on vinyl.

They signed debut artists such as Richard Devine, Scott Herren (Prefuse73, Savath & Savalas), Otto Von Schirach, Push Button Objects, and collaborating with the likes of Matmos, Autechre, Jamie Lidell, Matthew Herbert, and Glen Velez amongst many notable others. As the IDM scene began to grow, Schematic began networking with Warp Records. Some Schematic artists (such as Prefuse73) were signed by Warp as a result of this. According to Vice, "loads of Schematic artists had lasting careers with Warp."

With the popularization of the Internet in the early 00s, Schematics had to adapt to digital distribution. They were able to succeed at this due to their "weird outlook from the beginning", according to Vice.

== Legacy ==
A 2018 Miami New Times article describes the label as one that "helped make the city's music scene eclectic, weird, and wonderful".

== Artists signed with Schematic Records ==
- Delarosa & Asora
- Richard Devine
- Hearts Of Darknesses
- Badun ^{(da)}
- Prefuse 73

== See also ==
- List of record labels
