= Anachronauts (band) =

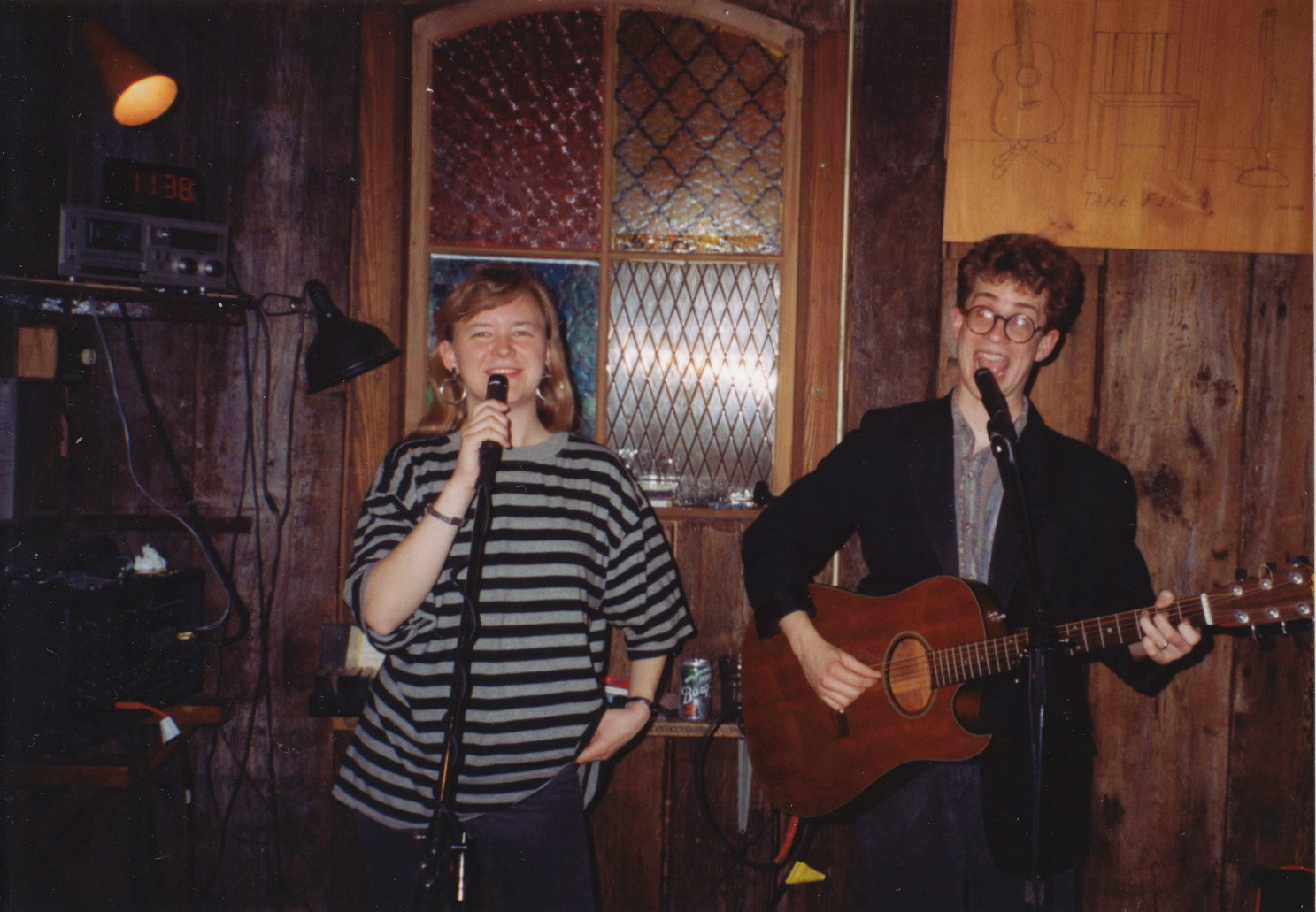
The Anachonauts, early gig in Uptown New Orleans, 1992

Anachronauts was an American surf rock band, founded by Scott Burright (guitar, lead vocals) and Stacey Hathaway (bassist, vocals) in 1992 in New Orleans, Louisiana. They moved to Dayton, Ohio in 1995, where they were joined by Steve Forte (lead guitar, mandolin). The style of Anachronauts was primarily "technofolk" with surf guitar, but blended heavy influence from classic science fiction genre and new wave musical groups such as Devo and Talking Heads. The band claimed to be "not of hard rock, but of hard science." They have been described as "Devo with really good Baptist church choir soloist" and "like the B-52's, only quirkier. Hathaway described the Anachronauts as "the bastard child of Devo and Peter, Paul, and Mary."

"Anachronauts are nothing if not confusing. Their slogan is 'Remember the future. Welcome to the present. Proceed to the past.'"

Anachronauts frequently opened for Eugene Chadbourne.

Their notable songs include "Now Showing," which appears on Disjointed Parallels (Eerie Materials - 1995) with Man or Astroman? and "Perpetual Motion" which appears on Eerie Bazaar (Eerie Materials - 1995).

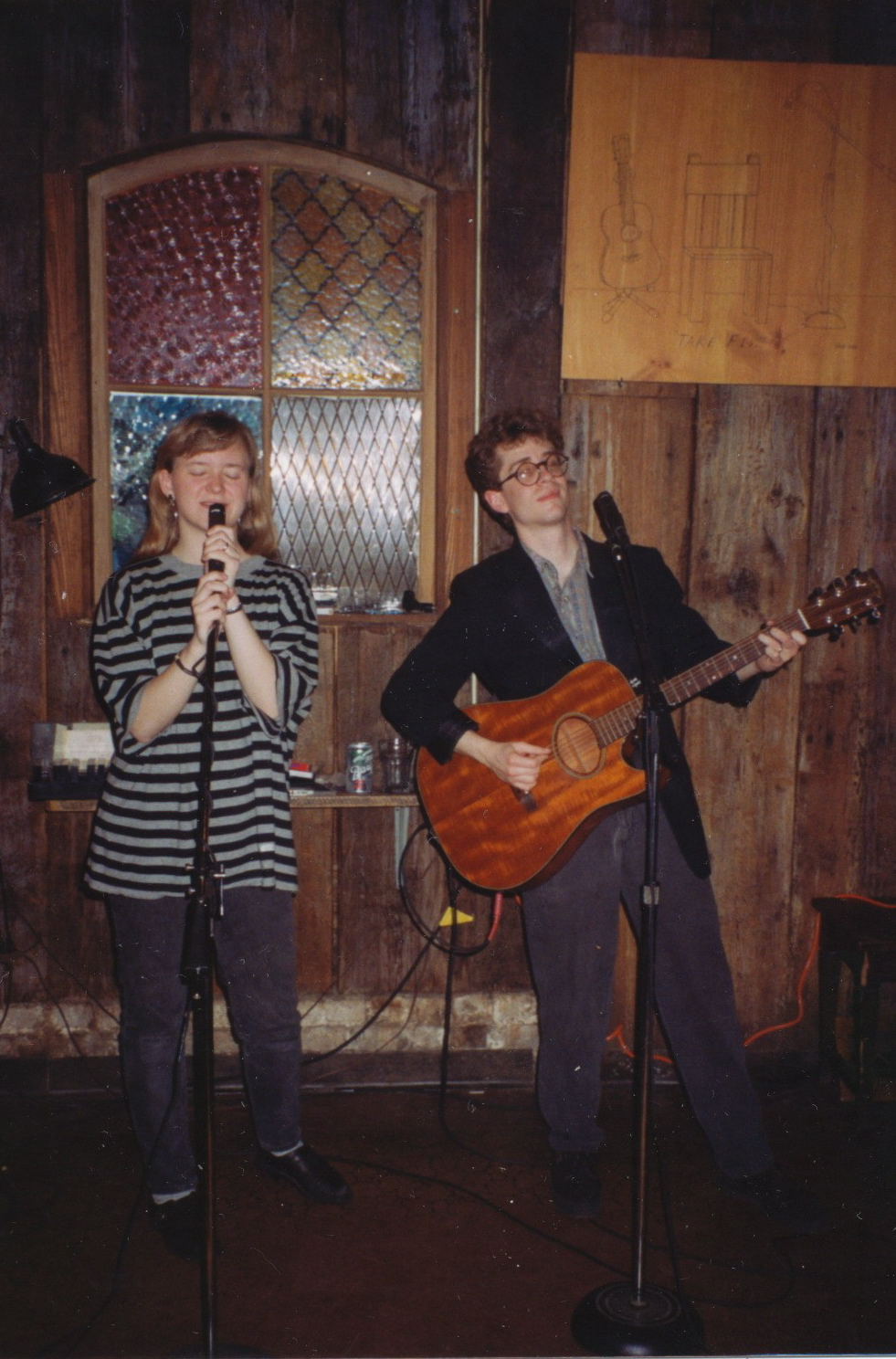
1992

== Discography ==
=== Albums ===
- Just Like Homemmade (1993)
- Popular Science (1994)
- Science Marches On (1995)
- Fashion Error EP (1996)

=== Splits ===
- 7" with Man or Astro-Man? Disjointed Parallels (Eerie Materials - 1995)

=== Compilation tracks ===
- "Perpetual Motion" on Eerie Bazaar CD (Eerie Materials - 1995)
