= The Tape-beatles =

American multi-media group

- The Tape-beatles in Berlin, 1997. From left to right: John Heck, Lloyd Dunn, Ralph Johnson

Background information
- Origin: Iowa City, Iowa, USA
- Genres: Musique concrète; Sound collage
- Years active: 1986–present
- Labels: Public Works Productions; Staalplaat (Amsterdam, Berlin); DOVentertainment (Toronto, Canada)
- Members: Lloyd Dunn; John Heck; Ralph Johnson; Paul Neff; Linda Morgan Brown
- Website: Official website

The Tape-beatles (also known as Public Works) are a multi-media group that formed in Iowa City in December 1986. Its members have included Lloyd Dunn, John Heck, Ralph Johnson, Paul Neff, and Linda Morgan Brown. Beginning with analog tape recorders, and later expanding to include digital technology and film media, the group has used collage techniques to create works that challenge the notion of intellectual property. Their works make extensive use of materials appropriated from various sources through a process they call "Plagiarism®". The Tape-beatles' body of work consists mainly of noise music and audio art recordings, expanded and performed cinema performances, videos, printed publications, as well as works in other media. They produce and release work under an umbrella organization called Public Works Productions.

== History ==
=== Lineup and early years ===
Members of The Tape-beatles currently include Lloyd Dunn and John Heck. Former or occasional members of the group have included Linda Morgan Brown, Chuck Hollister, Ralph Johnson, and Paul Neff. The group's initial focus was to create music that made use of techniques borrowed from musique concrète, but applied to a popular music context. To this end, they eschewed conventional musical instruments, instead contending that tape recording and the recording studio itself was their 'instrument'.

The Tape-beatles, then consisting of Dunn, Heck and Johnson, put out their first major work, A subtle buoyancy of pulse in 1988. In keeping with the tape esthetic, the work was available only on cassette (until being reissued 10 years later on CD by Staalplaat, Amsterdam, the Netherlands). Public response was sufficiently encouraging that the group immediately began work on a new album, adding two new members along the way: Paul Neff and Linda Morgan Brown.

=== 1991–2000 ===
A grant from Intermedia Arts Minnesota enabled The Tape-beatles to finish their second work in 1991, a CD for the Canadian label DOVentertainment, entitled Music with Sound. This was the record that put The Tape-beatles on the map to some extent, garnering favorable reviews in Keyboard, as well as putting them on the Top 10 Imports of the Year list in Pulse, the in-store magazine for the Tower Records chain. It remains the work for which the Tape-beatles are best known.

Music with Sound not only established the group's signature style and technique, it also provided The Tape-beatles with a coherent soundtrack upon which to base a live public performance. Using multiple image projection devices (16 and 8 mm film on reels and loops, film strips and slide projectors), as well as an array of strange and obsolete recording equipment culled from audiovisual surplus outlets (the 'language master', the 'calophone', the 'wollensak', etc.). The presentation was a barrage of discarded educational and motivational material put to a musical score that varied from the bombastic to the delicate and subtly constructed. The climax of the piece found the audience being surrounded by a single room-sized tape loop.

The year 1993 saw the release of The Grand Delusion (Staalplaat), a meditation on the U.S. Persian Gulf War and the historical context that created it. In addition, the group refined their presentation approach, distilling it down to just three 16 mm projectors, used in a configuration the group named 'Polyvision', in honor of Abel Gance's pioneering movie techniques of the 1920s. (Later this technique was renamed 'expanded cinema', and eventually 'performed cinema', by the group.)

In the meantime, Ralph Johnson moved to Oakland, Calif., to study composition at Mills College. Lloyd Dunn suspended all zine production (see PhotoStatic Magazine) and went on a yearlong trip abroad, spending most of the time in France (see The Expatriot), but also dropping in on John Heck, then living in Prague.

Upon Dunn's return to the United States, he and Ralph Johnson regrouped to form the duo Public Works. Using similar principles to the Tape-beatles, Public Works laid the focus on digital audio production, and tightened the emphasis on the making of music, with a reduced emphasis on pure sound collage or 'audio art'. 1997's Matter (Staalplaat) was the group's début recording. An 'expanded cinema' performance of that name was also created, and the group performed that and The Grand Delusion in a dozen cities from San Francisco to Berlin, Germany.

In 2000, Public Works released the EP Numbers on the Elevator Bath label. It explored the sounds of EVP (Electronic voice phenomenon) recordings, purported to document paranormal phenomena, and the so-called "numbers stations" that can occasionally be heard on the shortwave band. Some of the works sampled liberally from Akin Fernandez' "The Conet Project" recordings.

=== 2001–present ===
John Heck rejoined the group to work on a new proposed work for The Tape-beatles that would be called Good Times. A long-term project, it was envisioned from the start that the composition would take its full form as an audio visual presentation. The work was completed in September 2001. It premiered at the Sound Unseen Film Festival in Minneapolis, USA in October 2001, which also inaugurated a Tape-beatle tour of the US Midwest.

At the Sound Unseen Festival (Minneapolis-St. Paul, Minn., October, 2001), The Tape-beatles took an afternoon to improvise with fellow sound-collage artists Escape Mechanism (Jon Nelson), Steev Hise and Wobbly (Jon Leidecker). The result was the mini-CD and mini-VideoCD Minneapolis Summit.

More recently, The Tape-beatles have been performing their retrospective 'performed cinema' performance entitled "G.N.P.", compiled from their previous film performances, throughout Europe in 2005. Both Heck and Dunn currently reside in Prague, the Czech Republic.

In 2007, the group was asked to provide 28 minutes of programming for The Radia Network a series that highlights electronic and experimental sound work. The program was put together from older previously unreleased material, with a generous selection of new work. That same year, the Tape-beatles were commissioned by Czech Radio to produce a 24-minute composition for broadcast as part of the series rAdioCUSTICA, edited by Michal Rataj. The resulting work, "Sombre Gertrude - Piece for Stings," was first broadcast in January 2008.

== Selected discography ==
- A subtle buoyancy of pulse (1988)
- Music with Sound (1990)
- The Grand Delusion (1993)
- Matter (1996)
- Good Times (1999)
- Numbers (2000)
- Minneapolis Summit with Escape Mechanism, Steev Hise and Wobbly (2001)
- Sombre Gertrude - Piece for Strings (unreleased). Commissioned by Czech Radio's Radiocustica (2007)

== Selected filmography ==
- The Grand Delusion "PolyVision" 1996
- Matter "expanded cinema" 1997
- Good Times "expanded cinema" 2001
- G.N.P. "performed cinema" 2005
