= Go Home Productions =

Mark Vidler
- Born: Mark Andrew Vidler; May 4, 1967 (age 58); Barnet, Middlesex, England
- Occupation(s): Remixer, record producer, DJ
- Years active: 2002–present
- Labels: EMI, Basta

Go Home Productions (also known as GHP) is the alter ego of Mark Vidler, a producer/remixer/DJ based in Northampton (and formerly Watford), England. GHP has produced well over 200 mash-ups since May 2002, many of which have been played on both national and independent radio stations around the world. He was born on 4 May 1967 in Barnet, Middlesex, England.

== Career ==
GHP creations have been heard regularly on Xfm London's The Remix and The Rinse radio shows, and are heavily played on the New York City area station WFMU. A 30-minute Go Home Productions "Superchunk" mix was aired on Xfm in May 2003 to critical acclaim, and was voted "Superchunk of the year". GHP has also been nominated for Best Studio Session on XFM alongside the likes of The Darkness, Muse, Kings of Leon and Blur. GHP's WFMU Re:Mixology set was broadcast as part of a series that included the legendary mixer Steinski. Go Home Productions has worked with MTV Mash on their weekly bootleg video show and had five tracks on rotation across Europe in 2004. In the same year, Emap's QTV also broadcast a selection of 8 GHP tracks across their network.

GHP's 2005 mix "Rapture Riders" (Blondie vs The Doors) was not only approved by both bands, but has been re-remixed using the original studio tracks, and officially released both as a single and as a track on Blondie's 2005 album Greatest Hits: Sound & Vision. It reached #1 on the Billboard US Hot Dance Club Play chart in May 2006, and charted in the top 40 of multiple worldwide singles charts, with continual play on numerous MTV channels; the (Blondie vs The Doors) video was directed by audiovisual artists Addictive TV who created a video mash-up of the two tracks.

Another mash-up that has received approval of the original artists involved is "Ray of Gob" which superimposes the vocals from Madonna's "Ray of Light" onto clips from several songs by the Sex Pistols (including "Pretty Vacant", "God Save the Queen" and "Anarchy in the U.K.").

Many Go Home Productions tracks were included in the 2007 mash-up compilation Mashed, which featured previous hit tracks including "Rapture Riders" and "Notorious Trick" - a mixed version of Kelis and Duran Duran. The album also included two tracks by Loo & Placido, most notably the chart hit "Horny as a Dandy", featuring The Dandy Warhols and Mousse T.

Turning his skills to AV, for over 10 years Vidler has been one half of project Addictive TV with fellow artist Graham Daniels.

As of August 2024, Vidler's website has been offline and the domain name has been offered for sale.
