= Illegal Art =

Record label

- Founded: 1998
- Founder: Philo T. Farnsworth (pseudonym)
- Genre: Mashup, electronic, dance, glitch, experimental, pop
- Country of origin: United States
- Official website: https://www.illegal-art.net/

Illegal Art is a sampling record label that was started in 1998. The label gained immediate notoriety from legal threats surrounding Deconstructing Beck, a compilation made exclusively from sampling Beck's music. This was followed by two other theme-based compilations, Extracted Celluloid and Commercial Ad Hoc. All three were co-released with Negativland's Seeland Records label and sponsored by RTMark. After these theme-based compilations, Illegal Art focused on artist releases. One of the most popular artists on the label is Girl Talk (Gregg Gillis), who in 2006 released his third album, Night Ripper, to critical acclaim on the label, earning a Wired magazine Rave Award a year later.

Illegal Art also released the Steinski Retrospective, spanning his work from 1983 to 2006. It includes the legendary "Lessons", which have been described as "one of the most desirable and prized bootleg recordings in hip hop" (Antidote). It also contains a variety of other essential tracks, and his critically acclaimed Nothing to Fear: A Rough Mix, an hour-long mashup that was produced for Solid Steel/BBC London and hailed as "the closest to a masterpiece the genre has produced."

From 2012 to 2026, the label was on hiatus. In April of 2026, the label relaunched with new releases by Girl Talk and People Like Us.

== Artists ==
- B'O'K
- The Bran Flakes
- Christopher Penrose
- Girl Talk
- Hot Troche
- Junk Culture
- Oh Astro
- Økapi
- P. Miles Bryson
- People Like Us
- Realistic
- Steev Hise
- Steinski
- T.J. Miller
- Touch People
- Wobbly
- Yea Big

== See also ==
- List of record labels: I–Q
