= Girl Talk (musician) =

American DJ (born 1981)

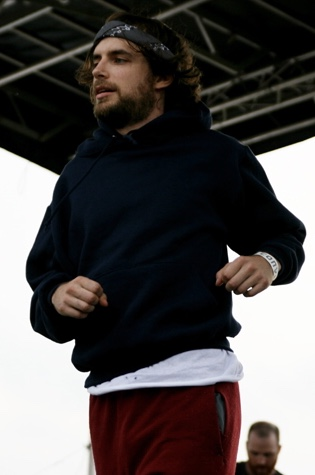
- Girl Talk in 2009

Background information
- Born: Gregg Michael Gillis; October 26, 1981 (age 45); Pittsburgh, Pennsylvania, U.S.
- Genres: Plunderphonics; mashup; hip-hop
- Instruments: Laptop; sampler; turntables
- Years active: 2001–present
- Labels: Illegal Art; 333 Recordings; SSS Records; Spasticated Records; 12 Apostles
- Website: www.girltalkmusic.com

Gregg Michael Gillis (born October 26, 1981), known professionally as Girl Talk, is an American disc jockey who specializes in mash-ups and digital sampling. He blends elements from a vast array of pop, hip-hop, and electronic music, creating dense, danceable tracks. His live performances are known for their immersive, party-like atmosphere, often featuring crowdsourced dancers and a celebratory vibe. Gillis has released five LPs on the record label Illegal Art and EPs on both 333 and 12 Apostles. He gained widespread recognition with albums like Night Ripper (2006) and All Day (2010), both of which were released for free online, contributing to his significant online following and influence on the mashup genre. His work has sparked discussions about copyright, sampling, and the nature of artistic creation in the digital age. He was trained as an engineer.

== Early life and education ==
Gillis began experimenting with electronic music and sampling while a student at Chartiers Valley High School in the Pittsburgh suburb of Bridgeville. After a few collaborative efforts, he started the solo "Girl Talk" project while studying biomedical engineering at Case Western Reserve University in Cleveland. In school, Gillis focused on tissue engineering.

== Influences ==
Gillis states his musical inspirations are Squarepusher, Aphex Twin, Just Blaze, Nirvana and Kid606 among others. He has also stated interest in punk rock, as well as noise musician Merzbow. He stated that he was first introduced to the genre of Plunderphonics by John Oswald. Gillis has also stated that he was always into hip-hop and pop music. As he aged, he started to like older musicians such as The Beatles.

== Career ==
Gillis worked as an engineer, but he quit in May 2007 to focus solely on music.

He produces mash-up remixes, in which he uses often a dozen or more unauthorized samples from different songs to create a mash-up. The New York Times Magazine has called his releases "a lawsuit waiting to happen", a criticism that Gillis has attributed to news media that want "to create controversy where it doesn't really exist", citing fair use as a legal backbone for his sampling practices.

Gillis has given his own different explanations for the origin of his stage name, once saying that it alluded to a Jim Morrison poem and once saying that it alluded to an early Merzbow side project. In 2009, he attributed the name to Tad, the early 1990s SubPop band, based in Seattle. Gillis has said the name sounded like a Disney music teen girl group.

In a 2009 interview with FMLY, Gillis stated:

The name Girl Talk is a reference to many things, products, magazines, books. It's a pop culture phrase. The whole point of choosing the name early on was basically to just stir things up a little within the small scene I was operating from. I came from a more experimental background and there were some very overly serious, borderline academic type electronic musicians. I wanted to pick a name that they would be embarrassed to play with. You know Girl Talk sounded exactly the opposite of a man playing a laptop, so that's what I chose.

Gillis is featured heavily in the 2008 open source documentary RiP!: A Remix Manifesto.

Girl Talk released his fifth LP All Day on November 15, 2010 for free through the Illegal Art website. A U.S. tour in support of All Day began in Gillis's hometown of Pittsburgh with two sold-out shows at the then-recently completed Stage AE concert hall. Since Gillis releases his music under Creative Commons licenses, fans may legally use it in derivative works. Many create mash-up video collages using the samples' original music videos. Filmmaker Jacob Krupnick chose Gillis's full-length album All Day as the soundtrack for Girl Walk//All Day, an extended music video set in New York City.

In 2014, Girl Talk brought out Freeway as a special guest during a show at the Brooklyn Bowl. They announced that they were releasing a collaborative EP together called Broken Ankles. The project was released on April 8, 2014.

Gillis played at the Coachella Festival in 2014. For the first time in one of his live shows, artists performed their vocals over his mash-ups. During the first weekend, he was joined by Too Short, E-40, Juicy J, and Busta Rhymes. On the second weekend, he was joined by Freeway, Waka Flocka Flame, Tyga, and Busta Rhymes.

In the years following the release of Broken Ankles, Girl Talk continued to tour and play festivals. He also began to do more production and collaborative work with other artists such as Wiz Khalifa, Young Nudy, T-Pain, Smoke DZA, Bas, and G Perico.

== Album pricing ==
After the success of his album Feed the Animals, for which listeners were asked to pay a price of their choosing, Gillis made all of his other albums similarly available via the Illegal Art website.

== Awards ==
Night Ripper was number 34 on Pitchfork's Top 50 Albums of 2006, number 22 on Rolling Stone's Best Albums of 2006, and number 27 on Spin's 40 Best Albums of 2006. In 2007, Gillis was the recipient of a Wired magazine Rave Award.

Feed the Animals was number four on Time's Top 10 Albums of 2008. Rolling Stone gave the album four stars and ranked the album No. 24 on their Top 50 albums of 2008. Blender rated it the second-best recording/album of 2008, and National Public Radio listeners rated it the 16th best album of the year.

Gillis' hometown Pittsburgh, Pennsylvania, named December 7, 2010 "Gregg Gillis Day".

== Film appearances ==
In 2007, Girl Talk appeared in Good Copy Bad Copy, a documentary about the then-current state of copyright law and remix culture.

In 2008, he appeared as a test case for fair use in Brett Gaylor's RiP!: A Remix Manifesto, a call to overhaul copyright laws. His parents, in one scene, complain to him about his frequent stripping during his performances.

== Discography ==
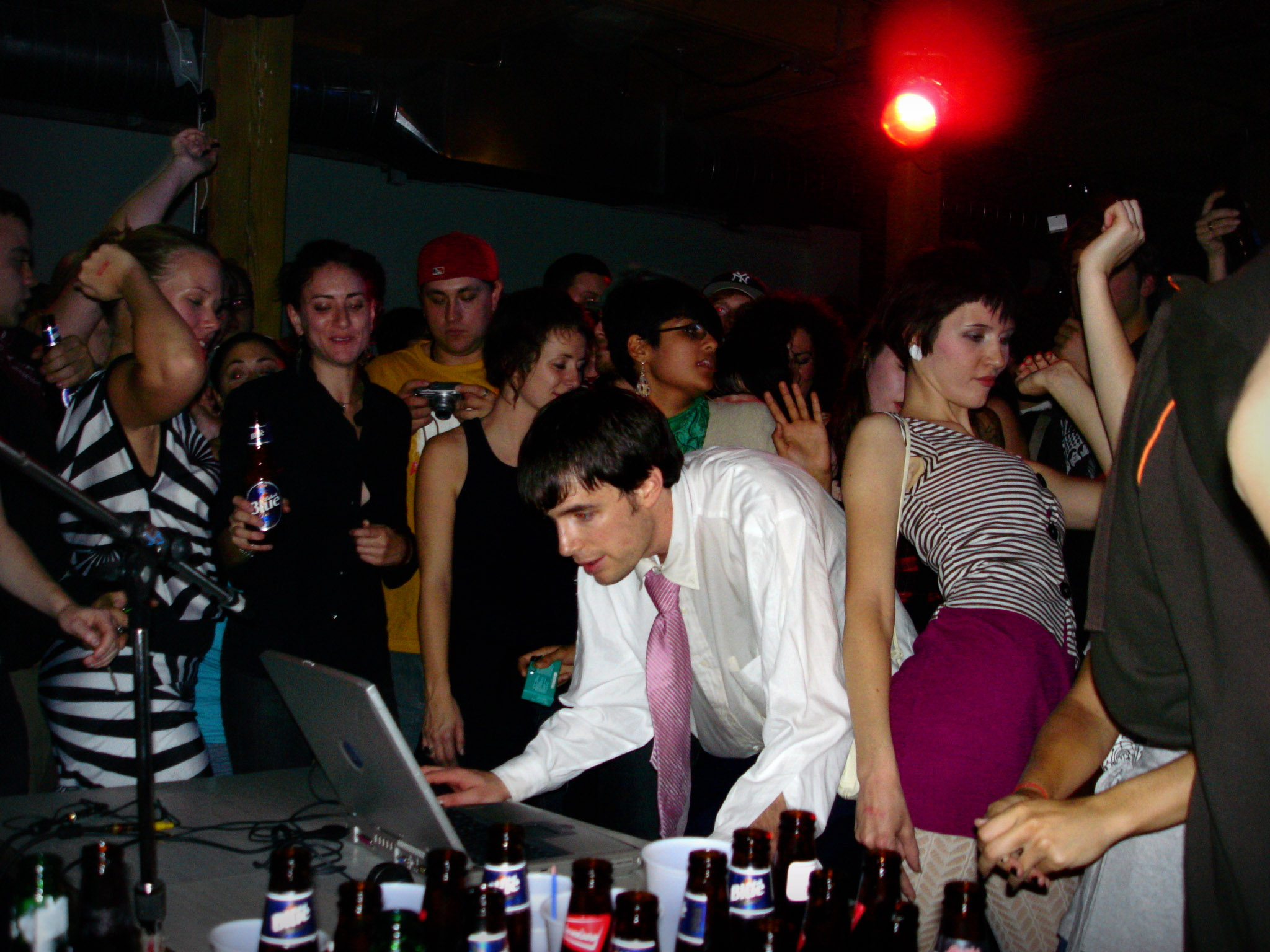
Girl Talk performing in 2006

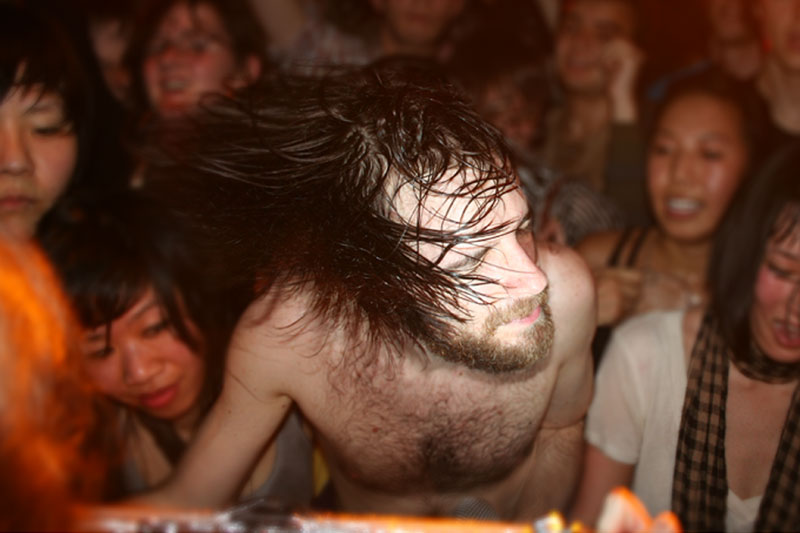
Girl Talk in Paris, 2007

=== Albums ===
- Secret Diary CD (2002, Illegal Art)
- Unstoppable CD (2004, Illegal Art)
- Night Ripper CD (2006, Illegal Art)
- Feed the Animals CD (2008, Illegal Art)
- All Day (2010, Illegal Art)

=== Collaborative albums ===
- Full Court Press (with Wiz Khalifa, Big K.R.I.T. and Smoke DZA) (2022, Asylum/Taylor Gang)
- Don't Come To My House Sharing Your Location (with Michael Christmas and Chris Crack) (2026, C&G Records/Stem)

=== EPs ===
- Stop Cleveland Hate 12" (2004, 12 apostles)
- Bone Hard Zaggin' 7" (2006, 333 recordings)
- Broken Ankles (with Freeway) (2014, Girl Talk Music)

=== Compilation appearances ===
- bricolage No. 1 CD (Illegal Art) – "Killing a Material Girl" – 3:37
- Illegal Art 2007 Sampler MP3 (Illegal Art) – "Let's Run This"
- Circuits of Steel CD (SSS) (2003) – "On Nesbit"
- Ministry of Shit CD (Spasticated) – "Let's Run This"
- Love and Circuits CD (Cardboard Records) – "All of the Other Songs Remixed" (under Trey Told 'Em)
- Circuits of Steel II CD (SSS) (2007) – "Andy Van Slyke Marijuana Sensitivity"

=== Singles ===
- "Tolerated" (with Freeway, featuring Waka Flocka Flame) (2014)
- "Trouble In Paradise" (with Erick the Architect) (2018)
- "No Problem" (with Young Nudy) (2019)
- Smoke DZA – "Santos House Party" (featuring Wiz Khalifa, Curren$y, Big K.R.I.T. & Girl Talk) (2020)
- "Fallin'" (with Bas) (2020)
- "Believe In Ya" (with T-Pain & Yaeji) (2025)
- "Real Life" (with Sauce Walka) (2025)

=== Remixes ===
- Beck – "Cellphone's Dead" (2006) (unreleased)
- Peter Bjorn and John – "Let's Call It Off" (2006)
- Grizzly Bear – "Knife" (2007)
- Bonde do Role – "Gasolina" (2009)
- Bad Brilliance – "Non-Tradition (Girl Talk Remix)/It's So Fun (Andrew WK Remix)" (2009)
- Tokyo Police Club – "Cheer It On" (2007, under Trey Told 'Em)
- Simian Mobile Disco – "I Believe" (2007, under Trey Told 'Em)
- Professor Murder – "Dutch Hex" (2007, under Trey Told 'Em)
- Of Montreal – "Gronlandic Edit" (2007, under Trey Told 'Em) (unreleased)
- Thrill Jockey Records – "Super Epic Thrill Jockey Mega Massive Anniversary Mix" (2007, under Trey Told 'Em)
- Ke$ha – "Tik Tok" (2010, under Trey Told 'Em)

=== Production credits ===
- Grand Buffet – "Cool as Hell" (2003)
- Jim Jones – "Believe in Magic" (featuring Lloyd) (2011)
- Freeway – "Addiction" (2016)
- Freeway – "First Thing's First" (2016)
- Freeway – "Always Love You" (2016)
- Wiz Khalifa – "Steam Room" (featuring Chevy Woods) (2017)
- Don Q – "Lil Bitch" (2017)
- Smoke DZA – "The Hook Up" (featuring Dom Kennedy & Cozz) (2018)
- T-Pain – "Getcha Roll On" (featuring Tory Lanez) (2019)
- 24hrs – "Bubble" (featuring Ty Dolla $ign) (2019)
- Smoke DZA & Curren$y – "Cinderella Story" (2019)
- Smoke DZA & Curren$y – "Boats and Hoes" (2019)
- Cozz & Bas – "Outta Pocket" (2020)
- G Perico – "Toolie" (2020)

== Live performances ==
Gillis began producing music with AudioMulch software, which he still uses, played live from a computer. During a live performance, he uses samples and loops to play a set — allowing room for variation throughout the set. His live sets are typically accompanied by video content on stage. He has been known to bring fans on stage to dance during performances.
