= Say No More 1 & 2 =

Compilation album by Bob Ostertag
- Released: April 16, 2002
- Genre: Experimental; free improvisation
- Length: 91:15
- Label: Seeland

Bob Ostertag chronology
PantyChrist (1999)	Say No More 1 & 2 (2002)	Say No More 3 & 4 (2002)

Say No More 1 & 2 is a compilation album by Bob Ostertag, released on April 16, 2002, by Seeland Records. It comprises the albums Say No More and Say No More in Person originally released in 1993.

== Track listing ==
Disc one
No.	Title	Writer(s)	Length
1.	"Say No More"	Baron, Dresser, Minton, Ostertag	21:02
2.	"Tongue-Tied"	Dresser, Hemingway, Minton, Ostertag	17:25

Disc two
No.	Title	Writer(s)	Length
1.	"Say No More"	Baron, Dresser, Minton, Ostertag	26:37
2.	"Tongue-Tied"	Dresser, Hemingway, Minton, Ostertag	16:11

== Personnel ==
Adapted from the Say No More 1 & 2 liner notes.

Musicians

- Mark Dresser – contrabass
- Phil Minton – voice
- Gerry Hemingway – percussion
- Bob Ostertag – sampler

Additional musicians

- Joey Baron – voice (1)

== Release history ==
Region	Date	Label	Format	Catalog
United States	2002	Seeland	CD	SEELAND 521
