= Say No More 3 & 4 =

Compilation album by Bob Ostertag
- Released: April 16, 2002
- Recorded: 1996 – January 1998
- Studio: Various: Kunstencentrum Vooruit; (Ghent, Belgium); ORF; (Vienna, Austria); Wheeler Auditorium; (Berkeley, CA)
- Genre: Experimental; free improvisation
- Length: 87:07
- Label: Seeland

Bob Ostertag chronology
Say No More 1 & 2 (2002)	Say No More 3 & 4 (2002)	DJ of the Month (2002)

Say No More 3 & 4 is a compilation album by Bob Ostertag, released on April 16, 2002, by Seeland Records. It comprises the 1996 studio album Verbatim and its 1998 live counterpart Verbatim, Flesh and Blood.

== Track listing ==
All tracks are written by Bob Ostertag.

Disc one
No.	Title	Length
1.	"Periwinkle"	9:05
2.	"Oxblood"	1:47
3.	"Smoke"	4:27
4.	"Ink"	8:34
5.	"Cornflower"	3:10
6.	"Paris Green"	5:26
7.	"Middle Stone"	3:27
8.	"Lavender"	3:25
9.	"Ash"	2:47

Disc two
No.	Title	Length
1.	"Periwinkle"	10:18
2.	"Oxblood"	2:16
3.	"Smoke"	7:35
4.	"Ink"	9:05
5.	"Cornflower"	3:31
6.	"Paris Green"	2:28
7.	"Middle Stone"	3:49
8.	"Lavender"	2:30
9.	"Ash"	3:25

== Personnel ==
Adapted from the Say No More 3 & 4 liner notes.

Musicians

- Mark Dresser – contrabass
- Gerry Hemingway – percussion
- Phil Minton – voice
- Bob Ostertag – sampler

== Release history ==
Region	Date	Label	Format	Catalog
United States	2002	Seeland	CD	SEELAND 522
