= Burns Like Fire =

Studio album by Bob Ostertag
- Released: 1992
- Genre: Experimental; field recordings
- Length: 41:14
- Label: RecRec
- Producer: Bob Ostertag

Bob Ostertag chronology
| Sooner or Later (1991) | Burns Like Fire (1992) | Say No More (1993) |

Burns Like Fire is the second studio album by Bob Ostertag, released in 1992 by RecRec Music.

== Reception ==
Professional ratings
Review scores
| Source | Rating |
|---|---|
| AllMusic | 2.5/5 stars |

François Couture of AllMusic says "Burns Like Fire remained unnoticed somehow, which is too bad since, even though not as strong as Attention Span or Say No More, it represents an important step in the man's artistic development."

== Track listing ==
| No. | Title | Length |
|---|---|---|
| 1. | "Go to It Boy (Burn It Down, Yeah)" | 7:35 |
| 2. | "Tears on the Sand in the Fierce Companionship of Thirst" | 12:10 |
| 3. | "Burns Like Fire" | 5:04 |
| 4. | "Heat Rises" | 2:50 |
| 5. | "Snow on Water/Smoke on Snow" | 13:34 |

== Personnel ==
Adapted from the Burns Like Fire liner notes.

Musicians

- Fred Frith – guitar (5)
- Bob Ostertag – Ensoniq EPS-16+ sampler, production, recording (1, 4)

Production and design

- Rob Fein – design
- David Wojnarowicz – cover art

== Release history ==
| Region | Date | Label | Format | Catalog |
|---|---|---|---|---|
| Switzerland | 1992 | RecRec | CD | ReCDec 53 |
