= Bob Ostertag Plays the Serge 1978–1983 =

Studio album by Bob Ostertag
- Released: June 30, 2014
- Recorded: 1978 – January 7, 1983
- Genre: Experimental
- Length: 59:32
- Label: Kandala/Analogue Motions Studio

Bob Ostertag chronology
Bob Ostertag Plays the Aalto (2013)	Bob Ostertag Plays the Serge 1978–1983 (2014)	Wish You Were Here (2016)

Bob Ostertag Plays the Serge 1978–1983 is the twelfth studio album by Bob Ostertag, released on June 30, 2014 by Analogue Motions Studio and Kandala Records.

== Reception ==
Chicago Reader gave Plays the Serge 1978–1983 a positive review and said "Ostertag plays solo or collaborates with fellow improvisers (saxophonist Ned Rothenberg, violinist Jim Katzin, guitarist Fred Frith), and his intuitive performances on the unwieldy instrument still sound dangerous today—I can't imagine how it would've felt to stumble on this in the late 70s."

== Track listing ==
All tracks are written by Bob Ostertag.

No.	Title	Length
1.	"At the Squart Theater, New York City, 1979"	7:42
2.	"At the Public Access Synthesizer Studio (Pass), January 7, 1983"	18:05
3.	"At an Unknown Venue in Santa Fe, New Mexico, 1980 or 1981"	20:44
4.	"In a Small Storefront on Matt Street, New York City, 1979"	8:51
5.	"In a Classroom at Oberlin College, 1978"	4:10

== Personnel ==
Adapted from the Bob Ostertag Plays the Serge 1978-1983 liner notes.

Musicians

- Fred Frith – guitar (2), six-string bass guitar (2)
- Jim Katzin – violin (1, 4, 5)
- Bob Ostertag – Serge synthesizer, liner notes, radio (1, 2, 3), percussion (3)
- Richard Rogers – piano (5)
- Ned Rothenberg – alto saxophone (1, 4), piano (5)

Production and design

- Bruce Levinson – recording (1, 2)

== Release history ==
Region	Date	Label	Format	Catalog
Taiwan	2014	Kandala, Analogue Motions Studio	CD	KRIM03
