= Book of hours (disambiguation) =

Books of hours are Christian prayer books which were used to pray the canonical hours.

Book of hours or books of hours may also refer to:

== Books ==
=== Religious books ===
- Agpeya, the Coptic Christian "Prayer Book of the Hours"
- Any of the illuminated manuscript books of hours in Category:Illuminated books of hours

=== Other books ===
- Passionate Journey, or My Book of Hours, a wordless novel by Frans Masereel
- The Book of Hours, a poetry collection by Rainer Maria Rilke

== Other media ==
- A Book of Hours, an album by Bob Ostertag
- Book of Hours, a 2023 video game
- The Book of the Hours, a poem by Rainer Maria Rilke in Poet Lore
