= Like a Melody, No Bitterness =

Studio album by Bob Ostertag
- Released: October 13, 1998
- Recorded: February 1997
- Studio: University of Technology (Sydney, Australia)
- Genre: Experimental
- Length: 41:14
- Label: Seeland

Bob Ostertag chronology
Verbatim (1996)	Like a Melody, No Bitterness (1998)	Verbatim, Flesh and Blood (1998)

Like a Melody, No Bitterness is the sixth studio album by Bob Ostertag, released on October 13, 1998 by Seeland Records.

== Music ==
The album comprises a single piece of music created by a Ensoniq ASR-10 sampler that slowly builds throughout from quiet abstract atmospherics into a distortion informed counterpoints. The music represented a continuation of Ostertag expanding his art through mixing samples of human voices and chanting crowd noises with purely electronic soundscapes and collaborating with improvisational musical acts such as Fred Frith and John Zorn. It was released to commemorate Ostertag's final improvisations using a sampler, which he had used to create music for over ten years, before switching to compose on a laptop computer.

== Reception ==
Professional ratings
Review scores
Source	Rating
AllMusic	2.5/5 stars

François Couture of AllMusic gave the album two and a half out of five possible stars, saying "although Ostertag shows some nice invention and definite mastery of his art, the piece lacks direction." A critic for Cadence gave it a positive review and called it "a long piece that grows and morphs itself from quiet clicks and rumblings into a complex web of shimmering intensity."

== Track listing ==
All tracks are written by Bob Ostertag.

No.	Title	Length
1.	"Part 1"	4:32
2.	"Part 2"	3:01
3.	"Part 3"	2:21
4.	"Part 4"	6:39
5.	"Part 5"	1:22
6.	"Part 6"	3:11
7.	"Part 7"	9:32
8.	"Part 8"	6:55
9.	"Part 9"	3:41

== Personnel ==
Adapted from the Like a Melody, No Bitterness liner notes.

Musicians

- Bob Ostertag – Ensoniq ASR-10 sampler

Additional musicians

- Fred Frith – guitar
- John Zorn – saxophone

Production and design

- Heide Foley – cover art, design

== Release history ==
Region	Date	Label	Format	Catalog
United States	1998	Seeland	CD	SEELAND 508
United States	2006		DL	
