= Getting a Head =

Live album by Bob Ostertag
- Released: 1980
- Recorded: January, May, June 1980
- Venue: Washington D.C., New York City
- Genre: Experimental music, free improvisation
- Length: 39:50
- Label: Rift (US)

Bob Ostertag chronology
Getting a Head (1980)	Voice of America (1982)

Getting a Head is the debut solo album of live improvised music by experimental sound artist Bob Ostertag. It features Ostertag playing a homemade real-time sound sourcing system with Fred Frith on guitar and Charles K. Noyes on percussion. The album was released on LP by Rift Records in 1980. It was later released on CD by ReR Megacorp in 2000, and by Seeland Records in 2001. In a review of Ostertag's 2009 book, Creative Life: Music, Politics, People, and Machines, Chris Gehman described Getting a Head as "wonderfully strange and inexplicable".

The sound sourcing system used on Getting a Head comprised three reel-to-reel tape recorders and four to six helium balloons (Note: In some sources Ostertag says he used four helium balloons, in others he says six were used.) to control the tape tension. It was conceived by Bryan Medwed and developed and deployed by Ostertag. Ostertag referred to this invention as "One of the first ... times that tape manipulation techniques developed by electronic composers for use in the studio were adapted for live performances and improvisation."

== Tape system ==
The idea behind Ostertag's real-time sound sourcing system came from Bryan Medwed, a friend from the Oberlin Conservatory of Music Ostertag and Medwed had attended. Ostertag developed the concept and produced a tape loop recording and playback system. The device consisted of three open-reel tape desks placed side by side, with a spool of recording tape on deck one running through deck two and onto a take-up reel on deck three. Deck one recorded the musician on channel one via the mixer, which was played back on the middle deck to the mixer. Channel one was looped back to deck one, via the mixer, where it was re-recorded. The middle deck also recorded the mix on channel two, which was played back on deck three. Channel two was looped back to the middle deck, where it was re-recorded.

Ostertag modified the middle tape machine so its playback and recording speed could be changed during the performance. This increased or decreased the sound pitch and tempo. To maintain the tape tension as the middle desk's speed changed, he ran the tape on each side of the middle deck through grommets suspended by four to six helium balloons. Ostertag manipulated the sound of performances by varying the speed of the middle deck and changing the combination of record and playback heads on the three decks.

Ostertag said this experimental musical instrument was "highly unstable". The balloons rose and fell with the sound pressure created by the music, and often pulled the tape off its track in a breeze. He recalled: "'Playing' the instrument was an exercise in disaster control, while the [musician] performing with me was placed in the awkward situation of never quite knowing how the contraption would mangle the sound next."

== Reception ==
Professional ratings
Review scores
Source	Rating
AllMusic	2/5 stars

In a review of Getting a Head at AllMusic, François Couture said Ostertag began experimenting with sound sampling a decade before it became a commercial viability. He called Medwed and Ostertag's invention "the strangest contraption". Couture wrote that Ostertag's manipulation of Frith's performance produced "a warped mirror image" of his guitar that was "strange and unsteady". He felt that "In Tundra" is "much better", stating that Ostertag made Noyes' "eerie" percussion "nightmarish". Overall Couture described the album as "a bit crude", but nonetheless "an interesting document".

Gregory Sandow wrote in The Village Voice that the sounds in Ostertag's duet with Frith on side A "move in short, almost breathless little impulses" and are "lively and alert". Side B with Ostertag and Noyes is more "peaceful", and Sandow felt that its final movement, with a sound loop repeating itself, "is especially lovely".

== Track listing ==
Side A
No.	Title	Writer(s)	Venue and date	Length
1.	"Getting a Head"	Bryan Medwed, Bob Ostertag, Fred Frith	Washington D.C., June 1980; New York City, May 1980 (last third)	18:40

Side B
No.	Title	Writer(s)	Venue and date	Length
1.	"In Tundra"	Medwed, Ostertag	The Kitchen, New York City, January 1980	21:10

Sources: Liner notes, Discogs.

== Personnel ==
Bob Ostertag's homemade real-time sound sourcing system showing three reel-to-reel tape decks and four helium balloons.

- Bob Ostertag – homemade tape contraption
- Fred Frith – guitar
- Charles K. Noyes – percussion, including bowed cymbals and junk metal
- Bryan Medwed – tape contraption concept

Sources: Liner notes, Discogs, AllMusic.

=== Sound and artwork ===
- Recorded by Bob Ostertag
- Side A mixed at Sorcerer Sound
- Side B mixed at Noise, New York City
- Liner notes by Bob Ostertag
- Photography by Ruth Thorne-Thomsen, Tina Curran

Sources: Liner notes, Discogs.

== Works cited ==
- Ostertag, Bob (2009). Creative Life: Music, Politics, People, and Machines. University of Illinois Press. ISBN 978-0-252-07646-6.
