= All the Rage (Kronos Quartet and Bob Ostertag album) =

Bob Ostertag: All the Rage

Studio album by Kronos Quartet
- Released: 22 October 1993
- Recorded: April 1993
- Genre: Avant-garde music
- Label: Nonesuch (#79332)
- Producer: Judith Sherman

Kronos Quartet chronology
Morton Feldman: Piano and String Quartet (1993)	Bob Ostertag: All the Rage (1993)	Night Prayers (1993)

Bob Ostertag chronology
Say No More in Person (1993)	All the Rage (1993)	Fear No Love (1995)

Bob Ostertag: All the Rage is an experimental album by the Kronos Quartet and Eric Gupton (reading). It is a composition by Bob Ostertag (with libretto by Sara Miles), whose loops and samples are alternated with music by the quartet. Ostertag composed the piece as a response to California governor Pete Wilson veto of pro-gay legislation in 1991. Proceeds went to AIDS research.

"All the Rage" includes sound that Ostertag recorded on location during the AB101 Veto Riot on Sept. 30, 1991, in San Francisco. The civil disturbance followed a protest against Wilson's veto of AB101, a bill that would have banned discrimination against lesbians and gay men in California.

A 2011 documentary short by filmmaker Steve Elkins recounts the history of the riot and of "All the Rage." In addition, Ostertag offered his memories of the riot and the background of the composition during a panel held at the GLBT History Museum in San Francisco marking the 20th anniversary of the riot.

== Track listing ==
All music is composed by Bob Ostertag, with libretto by Sara Miles.

No.	Title	Length
1.	"All the Rage"	16:15

== Critical reception ==
Rob Theakston, writing for allmusic, said the interplay between Kronos and Ostertag is full of tension of potent magnitude, and called it "an eloquent tone poem that fans of both artists will enjoy."

== Personnel ==
=== Musicians ===
- David Harrington – violin
- John Sherba – violin
- Hank Dutt – viola
- Joan Jeanrenaud – cello
- Eric Gupton – reading

=== Production ===
- Recorded at Mastersound Studios, Astoria, Queens
  - Judith Sherman – Producer
  - Robert Hurwitz – Executive producer
  - Paul Zinman – Engineer
  - David Merrill – Assistant engineer
- David Wojnarowicz – Cover
- Frank Olinsky – Design

== See also ==
- List of 1993 albums
