= Wish You Were Here =

Wish You Were Here may refer to:

== Film, television, and theater ==
=== Film ===
- Wish You Were Here (1987 film), a British comedy-drama film by David Leland
- Wish You Were Here (2012 film), an Australian drama/mystery film by Kieran Darcy-Smith
- Wish You Were Here (2013 film), an American road movie by James O'Brien
- Wish You Were Here (2025 film), an American romance drama film by Julia Stiles
- "Wish You Were Here", a segment of the 1972 horror film Tales from the Crypt

=== Television ===
- Wish You Were Here...?, a 1974–2003 UK holiday documentary programme
- Wish You Were Here (American TV series), a 1990 sitcom
- "Wish You Were Here" (Arthur), a 2016 episode
- "Wish You Were Here" (The Avengers), a 1969 episode
- "Wish You Were Here" (Bear in the Big Blue House), a 1998 episode
- "Wish You Were Here" (Californication), a 2009 episode
- "Wish You Were Here" (Grey's Anatomy), a 2009 episode
- "Wish You Were Here" (Jake and the Fatman), a 1989 episode
- "Wish You Were Here" (Once Upon a Time), a 2016 episode
- "Wish You Were Here" (Thomas & Friends), a 2020 episode

=== Theatre ===
- Wish You Were Here (musical), a 1952 Broadway musical
- Wish You Were Here, a 1964 play by John McDonnell
- Wish You Were Here, a 2022 play by Sanaz Toossi

== Literature ==
=== Fiction ===
- Wish You Were Here (Holt novel), a 1998 novel by Tom Holt
- Wish You Were Here (Picoult novel), a 2021 novel by Jodi Picoult
- Wish You Were Here (Swift novel), a 2011 novel by Graham Swift
- Wish You Were Here, a 2007 novel by Mike Gayle
- Wish You Were Here, a 2023 novel by Nicola Monaghan
- Wish You Were Here, a 2002 novel by Stewart O'Nan
- Greg the Sausage Roll: Wish You Were Here, a 2023 children's book by LadBaby

=== Nonfiction ===
- Wish You Were Here (Allore and Pearson book), a 2020 true crime book by John Allore and Patricia Pearson
- Wish You Were Here: The English at Play, a 1976 photobook by Patrick Ward with text by James Cameron
- Wish You Were Here: The Official Biography of Douglas Adams, a 2005 biography of Douglas Adams by Nick Webb

== Music ==
- Wish You Were Here, a 2006 orchestral work by Nico Muhly

=== Albums ===
- Wish You Were Here (Badfinger album), 1974
- Wish You Were Here (Bob Ostertag album) or the title song, 2016
- Wish You Were Here (Mark Wills album) or the title song (see below), 1998
- Wish You Were Here (Pink Floyd album) or the title song (see below), 1975
- Wish You Were Here (The Ten Tenors album), 2017
- Wish You Were Here, by the Kingsmen, 1991
- Wish You Were Here!, a collection of episodes from the radio show Adventures in Odyssey

=== Songs ===
- "Wish You Were Here" (1952 song), a song from the Broadway musical recorded by Eddie Fisher
- "Wish You Were Here" (Avril Lavigne song), 2011
- "Wish You Were Here" (Barbara Mandrell song), 1981
- "Wish You Were Here" (Delta Goodrem song), 2012
- "Wish You Were Here" (Incubus song), 2001
- "Wish You Were Here" (Mark Wills song), 1999
- "Wish You Were Here" (Pink Floyd song), 1975
- "Wish You Were Here" (Rednex song), 1995
- "Wish U Were Here", by Cody Simpson, 2012
- "Wish You Were Here", by Alice Cooper from Alice Cooper Goes to Hell, 1976
- "Wish You Were Here", by the Bee Gees from One, 1989
- "Wish You Were Here", by Black Coffee featuring Msaki from Subconsciously, 2021
- "Wish You Were Here", by Dead or Alive from Sophisticated Boom Boom, 1984
- "Wish You Were Here", by Lee Fields, 2012
- "Wish You Were Here", by Fleetwood Mac from Mirage, 1982
- "Wish You Were Here", by Kabir Suman from Reaching Out, 2003
- "Wish You Were Here", by J. J. Cale from Stay Around, 2019
- "Wish U Were Here", by Jamie Foxx from Unpredictable, 2005
- "Wish You Were Here", by the Get Up Kids from On a Wire, 2002
- "Wish You Were Here", by Hey Monday from Beneath It All, 2010
- "Wish You Were Here", by Luminous, 2022
- "Wish You Were Here", by Matt Brouwer from Till the Sunrise, 2012
- "Wish You Were Here", by Mýa from Sugar & Spice, 2008
- "Wish You Were Here", by Nick Lowe from The Abominable Showman, 1983
- "Wish U Were Here", by Pale Waves from Who Am I?, 2021
- "Wish You Were Here", by Ryan Adams from Rock n Roll, 2003
- "Wish You Were Here", by Skepta, 2019

== See also ==
- I Wish You Were Here (disambiguation)
- "Wish That You Were Here", a 2016 song by Florence and the Machine
- "Wishing You Were Here", a 1974 song by Chicago
- WYWH (disambiguation)
