= Sooner or Later (Bob Ostertag album) =

Studio album by Bob Ostertag
- Released: 1991
- Recorded: January – June 1990
- Studio: Bear Cave (San Francisco, CA)
- Genre: Free improvisation; sound collage
- Length: 43:23
- Label: RecRec

Bob Ostertag chronology
Attention Span (1990)	Sooner or Later (1991)	Burns Like Fire (1992)

Sooner or Later is the debut studio album of Bob Ostertag, released in 1991 by RecRec Music.

== Reception ==
Professional ratings
Review scores
Source	Rating
AllMusic	4.5/5 stars

"Blue" Gene Tyranny of AllMusic gave Sooner or Later four and a half out of five stars.

== Track listing ==
No.	Title	Length
1.	"Part One"	29:11
2.	"Part Two"	14:12

== Personnel ==
Adapted from the Sooner or Later liner notes.

Musicians

- Fred Frith – guitar (2)
- Chaquito – voice
- Bob Ostertag – sampler

Production and design

- Tom Erbe – engineering, mastering
- Lucija Kordic – cover art, design
- David Wojnarowicz – photography

== Release history ==
Region	Date	Label	Format	Catalog
Switzerland	1991	RecRec	CD, LP	ReCDec 37
United States	2000	My Very Own Record Label/Seeland	CD	MVORL-3, Seeland 514
United States	2009	Free Music Archive	DL	
United Kingdom	2013	RēR Megacorp	CD	ReR B01
