= Twins! =

Studio album by Bob Ostertag/Otomo Yoshihide
- Released: 1996
- Genre: Experimental
- Length: 49:24
- Label: Sank-Ohso Discs/Creativeman Disc.

Bob Ostertag chronology
Fear No Love (1995)	Twins! (1996)	Verbatim (1996)

Twins! is the a collaborative studio album by Bob Ostertag and Otomo Yoshihide, released in 1996 by Sank-Ohso Discs and Creativeman Disc.

== Track listing ==
All tracks are written by Bob Ostertag and Otomo Yoshihide.

No.	Title	Length
1.	"Wacked"	4:00
2.	"Exercises for Currency"	6:57
3.	"Bear Rooms (Dust)"	4:46
4.	"The Power of Success"	5:48
5.	"Fruits From Viet Nam"	4:00
6.	"4 Rooms of Hong Kong Stuntman"	6:42
7.	"You're Going Nowhere"	5:32
8.	"Tabbing Will Get You There Faster"	5:15
9.	"Otok"	6:24

== Personnel ==
Adapted from the Twins! liner notes.

Musicians

- Bob Ostertag – Ensoniq ASR-10 sampler
- Otomo Yoshihide – electronics

== Release history ==
Region	Date	Label	Format	Catalog
Japan	1996	Sank-Ohso Discs/Creativeman Disc.	CD	CMDD-00030
