= Verbatim, Flesh and Blood =

Live album by Bob Ostertag
- Released: 1998
- Recorded: January 1998
- Studio: Kunstencentrum Vooruit (Ghent, Belgium)
- Genre: Experimental; free improvisation
- Length: 45:01
- Label: Rastascan

Bob Ostertag chronology
Like a Melody, No Bitterness (1998)	Verbatim, Flesh and Blood (1998)	PantyChrist (1999)

Verbatim, Flesh and Blood is a live album by Bob Ostertag, released in 1998 by Rastascan Records.

== Reception ==
Professional ratings
Review scores
Source	Rating
AllMusic	4/5 stars

François Couture of AllMusic gave the album four out of five possible stars, saying "quiet passages abound, textures are more refined, dynamics wider, and the whole thing is more pensive and introspective, without being self-absorbed." Couture concluded by saying "this whole project will go down in history as one of the most original artistic propositions of the 1990s."

== Track listing ==
All tracks are written by Bob Ostertag.

No.	Title	Length
1.	"Periwinkle"	10:20
2.	"Oxblood"	2:18
3.	"Smoke"	7:34
4.	"Ink"	9:06
5.	"Cornflower"	3:32
6.	"Paris Green"	2:29
7.	"Middle Stone"	3:50
8.	"Lavender"	2:30
9.	"Ash"	3:22

== Personnel ==
Adapted from the Verbatim, Flesh and Blood liner notes.

Musicians

- Bob Ostertag – sampler

Additional musicians

- Mark Dresser – contrabass
- Phil Minton – voice
- Gerry Hemingway – percussion

Production and design

- D-L Alvarez – cover art, design

== Release history ==
Region	Date	Label	Format	Catalog
United States	1998	Rastascan	CD	BRD 035
United States	1999	Seeland	CD	SEELAND 512
