= Motormouth Variations =

Remix album by Rrose x Bob Ostertag
- Released: July 2011
- Genre: Dub techno
- Length: 41:50
- Label: Sandwell District

Bob Ostertag chronology
Motormouth (2011)	Motormouth Variations (2011)	A Book of Hours (2013)

Motormouth Variations is a remix album by Bob Ostertag, released in July 2011 by Sandwell District.

== Track listing ==
All tracks are written by Bob Ostertag.

No.	Title	Length
1.	"Pointilism" (Variation One)	9:54
2.	"Wack" (Variation One)	4:13
3.	"Arms and Legs" (Variation One)	5:32
4.	"Pointilism" (Variation Two)	9:47
5.	"Shadow Pocket" (Variation One)	4:56
6.	"Arms and Legs" (Variation Two)	7:28

== Personnel ==
Adapted from the Motormouth Variations liner notes.

Musicians

- Bob Ostertag – sampler
- Rrose – remixing

Production and design

- Matt Colton – mastering

== Release history ==
Region	Date	Label	Format	Catalog
United States	2011	Sandwell District	DL, LP	SD 2 X 1202
United Kingdom	2015	Eaux	DL	EAUX-RE04
