= DJ of the Month =

Studio album by Bob Ostertag
- Released: November 19, 2002
- Genre: Glitch; sound collage; turntablism
- Length: 40:47
- Label: Seeland

Bob Ostertag chronology
Say No More 3 & 4 (2002)	DJ of the Month (2002)	w00t (2007)

DJ of the Month is the seventh studio album by Bob Ostertag, released on November 19, 2002 by Seeland Records.

== Reception ==
The Squid's Ear gave the DJ of the Month a positive review and said "the listener is assailed by sounds from all angles that rapidly collide and slam the ears" and "music is fragmented, sped and slowed, compressed and expanded and mangled in all possible descriptions."

== Track listing ==
All tracks are written by Bob Ostertag.

No.	Title	Length
1.	"Conformity"	8:10
2.	"Marketability"	5:03
3.	"Other"	9:29
4.	"Attitude"	8:50
5.	"Price"	4:53
6.	"Diligence"	4:22

== Personnel ==
Adapted from the DJ of the Month liner notes.

Musicians

- Bob Ostertag – sampler

== Release history ==
Region	Date	Label	Format	Catalog
United States	2002	My Very Own Record Label, Seeland	CD	MVORL-2, SEELAND 526
