= PantyChrist =

Live album by Bob Ostertag
- Released: May 18, 1999
- Recorded: October 1997
- Studio: Various: Great American Music Hall; (San Francisco, CA); Toast Studio; (San Francisco, CA)
- Genre: Experimental
- Length: 50:21
- Label: Seeland

Bob Ostertag chronology
Verbatim, Flesh and Blood (1998)	PantyChrist (1999)	Say No More 1 & 2 (2002)

PantyChrist is a live album by Bob Ostertag, released on May 18, 1999 by Seeland Records.

== Reception ==
Professional ratings
Review scores
Source	Rating
AllMusic	3/5 stars

Tom Schulte of AllMusic gave the album three out of five possible stars, saying "At their most wrong, PantyChrist mixes the simple, bright melodies of childhood with the obscenely suggestive notions of an unleashed pervert."

== Track listing ==
All tracks are written by Bob Ostertag.

No.	Title	Length
1.	"Overture"	5:14
2.	"Feet So Low"	3:34
3.	"Bitter Mommy"	2:51
4.	"I Love Animals"	3:34
5.	"Sunshine"	1:14
6.	"Giidy Up Cowboy"	7:20
7.	"Purple Butterflies"	1:42
8.	"When I Come Back"	2:19
9.	"Coconut"	2:05
10.	"King Kong"	6:11
11.	"Wooden Shoes"	2:39
12.	"Suzanne"	4:18
13.	"Just Whistle"	2:15
14.	"The Tigress Inside"	3:32
15.	"A Dreadful Thing (Coda)"	1:32

== Personnel ==
Adapted from the PantyChrist liner notes.

Musicians

- Justin Vivian Bond – vocals
- Trevor Dunn – bass guitar
- Uchihashi Kazuhisa – guitar
- Mizuhiro (as Animo Computer) – synthesizer
- Bob Ostertag – sampler, arrangements, mixing
- Richard Rogers – keyboards
- Jon Rose – violin, additional vocals
- Otomo Yoshihide – electronics, turntables

Production and design

- Heide Foley – design
- Michael Mott – cover art, illustrations
- Daniel Nicolletta – photography

== Release history ==
Region	Date	Label	Format	Catalog
United States	1999	Seeland	CD	SEELAND 510
