= Motormouth (disambiguation) =

Motormouth is a British children's Saturday morning TV magazine show that ran from 1988 from 1992.

Motormouth or Motor Mouth may also refer to:

- Motormouth (American TV series), an American hidden camera television series that aired on VH1 in 2004
- Motormouth (comics), a Marvel UK comics character
- Motormouth: Bob Ostertag Plays the Buchla 200e, a 2011 album by Bob Ostertag
- "Motor Mouth", a song from the American musical comedy TV show The Naked Brothers Band
- "Motormouth" Mike Morgan, a commentator from the Gorgeous Ladies of Wrestling
- "Motormouth" Lisa Ruddy, a cast member of You Can't Do That on Television
- John Moschitta Jr. (born 1954), American spokesperson known for rapid speaking
