= Voice of America (Frith, Ostertag and Minton album) =

Live album by Fred Frith, Bob Ostertag and Phil Minton
- Released: 1982
- Recorded: January 1981; August 1981
- Venue: PASS, New York City; ICA, London
- Genre: Experimental music; free improvisation
- Length: 38:39
- Label: Rift (US)

Bob Ostertag chronology
Getting a Head (1980)	Voice of America (1982)	Attention Span (1990)

Fred Frith chronology
Live in Japan (1982)	Voice of America (1982)	Cheap at Half the Price (1983)

Voice of America is a 1982 live collaborative album of improvised experimental music by Fred Frith, Bob Ostertag and Phil Minton. It was recorded live at PASS (Public Access Synthesizer Studio), New York City in January 1981, and the Actual Festival at the ICA (Institute of Contemporary Arts), London in August 1981. The album was released on LP by Rift Records in 1982. RecRec Music reissued the album on CD in 1994.

The PASS concert featured Frith and Ostertag, while the ICA concert featured Frith, Ostertag and Minton. Tape recordings made by Ostertag in Nicaragua in 1980 were played in both performances; other recordings from radio and TV shows were also used. The LP release included an insert with transcriptions and song lyrics, in Spanish and English, of the recordings used.

== Background ==
In 1980 Ostertag spent time in Nicaragua recording songs and raising money for El Salvador guerrillas fighting the Sandinista National Liberation Front, who had seized power the year before. He used these tapes, plus additional recordings of radio and TV shows, in both Voice of America concerts. Ostertag's equipment was a keyboard-less, modular Serge synthesizer, telephone answering machine cassette loops, and cassette players, modified to malfunction unpredictably. None of the musicians knew which tape would play next.

At the ICA concert, vocalist Minton was recruited from the audience to replace Ostertag's synthesizer, which had been "destroyed in a technical mishap". Minton sang, Ostertag used his broken cassette players and a contact microphone, and Frith played a "guitar" he had made from "a piece of scrap wood with some guitar strings stretched over a pickup". Ostertag's later referred to the event as "magical".

== Reception ==
Professional ratings
Review scores
Source	Rating
AllMusic	3/5 stars
DownBeat	3/5 stars

A reviewer at Music and Sound Output described Voice of America as "the oddest 'music' I've ever heard"—it has no traditional melody, harmony or rhythm, but is rather "composed noise ... the sound of lives lived, and lives lost". The reviewer said while it is ambient, "it sure isn't soothing" like Eno's Music for Airports.

Howard Mandel wrote in a review in DownBeat that the "metallic electronics" on the album paints an alarming picture of events in South America. He said in contrast, the Super Bowl and Let's Make a Deal tapes bluntly dismiss North American culture. Mandel concluded that "[p]rogrammatic, perhaps dogmatic, Voice of America would seem too obvious for critical comment, were new music lovers more committed to political study than they seem to be."

In a review at Babyblaue Seiten, Ralf J. Günther wrote that to appreciate Voice of America, the listener needs to understand the political climate in the United States and Nicaragua in the early 1980s. He described the album as having "no music in the conventional sense", but rather a collage of tapes played at random, accompanied by noise and free instrumentation. Günther said the use of prepared tapes contrasts with, and complements the improvisations. He added that Frith and Ostertag's use of radios reminded him of the way Holger Czukay used the radio as a musical instrument.

== Track listing ==
Side A
No.	Title	Writer(s)	Venue / date	Length
1.	"Voice of America (Part 1)"	Fred Frith, Bob Ostertag	PASS, New York City; January 1981	17:04

Side B
No.	Title	Writer(s)	Venue / date	Length
1.	"Voice of America (Part 2)"	Frith, Ostertag, Phil Minton	Actual Festival, ICA, London; August 1981	21:35

Sources: Liner notes, Discogs.

== Personnel ==
- Fred Frith
  - Side A – guitar, tapes, radio
  - Side B – homemade instruments
- Bob Ostertag
  - Side A – Serge synthesizer, tapes, contact microphones, radio
  - Side B – tapes, contact microphones
- Phil Minton
  - Side B – voice

Sources: Liner notes, Discogs.

=== Sound and artwork ===
- Side A recorded on cassette tape by Bruce Levinson
- Side B recorded by Jean-Marc Foussat
- Mastered by Howie Weinberg
- Liner notes by Bob Ostertag, Fred Frith and Phil Minton
- Translations by Bob Ostertag, Cecilia Dega and Susan Greenburg
- Typesetting by Eugene Nowacki
- Photography by Tina Curran

Sources: Liner notes, Discogs.

== Tape recording sources ==
- Side A
  1. "¿Qué Hacen los Extraños?" by José Armijo, Salvadoran singer
  2. Sandinista dialogue from "La Guitarra Armada" (The Armed Guitar) by Carlos Mejia Godoy
  3. "Revolución", from the Atlantic coast of Nicaragua
  4. Chronology of the Chilean Coup; 1973 Rounder Records
  5. "Let's Make a Deal!"
  6. TV coverage of the return of the Teheran hostages
  7. "Let's Make a Deal!" (continued)
  8. The Super Bowl, 1981
- Side B
  1. Salvadoran National Guard chanting slogans while training
  2. Chaquito, a small boy, speaking at his father's funeral on the Chinchontepec volcano, El Salvador: Film Institute of Revolutionary El Salvador, FMLN
  3. Small girl singing at a ceremony to mark the end of the literacy campaign in Esteli, Nicaragua
  4. Song: "Mourn Not the Dead", by Ralph Chaplin, member of the I.W.W.
  5. Small girl singing ... (continued)

Sources: Liner notes.

== Works cited ==
- Ostertag, Bob (2009). Creative Life: Music, Politics, People, and Machines. University of Illinois Press. ISBN 978-0-252-07646-6.
