= Say No More in Person =

Live album by Bob Ostertag
- Released: 1993
- Genre: Experimental; free improvisation
- Length: 42:35
- Label: Transit

Bob Ostertag chronology
Say No More (1993)	Say No More in Person (1993)	All the Rage (1993)

Say No More in Person is a live album by Bob Ostertag, released in 1993 by Transit.

== Track listing ==
No.	Title	Writer(s)	Length
1.	"Say No More"	Baron, Dresser, Minton, Ostertag	26:35
2.	"Tongue-Tied"	Dresser, Hemingway, Minton, Ostertag	16:00

== Personnel ==
Adapted from the Say No More in Person liner notes.

Musicians

- Joey Baron – percussion
- Mark Dresser – bass guitar
- Phil Minton – voice
- Bob Ostertag – sampler, liner notes

Production and design

- Jacqueline Csuss – liner notes
- Sylvia Eckermann – illustrations
- Reinhard Mayr – photography
- Ilia Vasella – design
- Gerhard Wieser – engineering
- David Wojnarowicz – photography

== Release history ==
Region	Date	Label	Format	Catalog
Switzerland	1993	Transit	CD	44 44 44
