= Bob Ostertag Plays the Aalto =

Studio album by Bob Ostertag
- Released: October 21, 2013
- Genre: Experimental
- Length: 40:43

Bob Ostertag chronology
A Book of Hours (2013)	Bob Ostertag Plays the Aalto (2013)	Bob Ostertag Plays the Serge 1978-1983 (2014)

Bob Ostertag Plays the Aalto is the eleventh studio album by Bob Ostertag, self-released on October 21, 2013.

== Track listing ==
All tracks are written by Bob Ostertag.

No.	Title	Length
1.	"Machine State, No. 1"	3:27
2.	"Machine State, No. 2"	2:54
3.	"Machine State, No. 3"	5:33
4.	"Machine State, No. 4"	4:33
5.	"Machine State, No. 5"	5:44
6.	"Machine State, No. 6"	4:51
7.	"Machine State, No. 7"	1:51
8.	"Machine State, No. 8"	6:05
9.	"Machine State, No. 9"	2:02
10.	"Machine State, No. 10"	2:21
11.	"Machine State, No. 11"	1:23

== Personnel ==
Adapted from the Bob Ostertag Plays the Aalto liner notes.

Musicians

- Bob Ostertag – Aalto synthesizer, liner notes

== Release history ==
Region	Date	Label	Format	Catalog
United States	2013		DL	
