= Connie Norman =

AIDS and trans rights activist (1949–1996)

- Born: 1949
- Died: July 15, 1996 (aged 46–47)
- Occupations: AIDS and gay and transgender rights activist

Connie Norman (1949 – July 15, 1996) was an AIDS and gay and transgender rights activist with ACT UP/LA. Beginning in 1991, she was the host of the first daily commercial talk radio show about gay issues in Los Angeles, and also co-hosted a television show. After her death from AIDS, ACT UP scattered her ashes on the White House lawn.

== Activism with ACT UP ==
Norman was a member of the AIDS activism group ACT UP ("AIDS Coalition to Unleash Power"). She also worked with the AIDS Healthcare Foundation to campaign for AIDS services. She was sometimes nicknamed "the AIDS Diva" because of her outspokenness.

In the summer of 1990, Norman protested that home healthcare providers contracted by Los Angeles County refused to go to minority neighborhoods after dark, and that some did not accept Medicare or MediCal. She protested that the county's outpatient clinic was also understaffed to the point that there were four-month wait times for appointments. Norman and other ACT UP members formed an "Alternative Budget Coalition" with about fifteen other organizations, rented the Los Angeles County Board of Supervisors' meeting room, and held a mock hearing on the county's budget. She also agitated for needle exchange programs.

In 1991, Norman worked with the LIFE Lobby to pass AB101, a bill prohibiting employers from discriminating against workers on the basis of sexual orientation. Norman participated in a hunger strike with Rob Roberts to draw attention to the bill. When California governor Pete Wilson vetoed it, a riot and subsequent protests broke out.

On October 13, 1996, after her death, her friend David Reid and other ACT UP activists marched from the Capitol to the White House and scattered her ashes (and those of other activists including David Wojnarowicz) on the White House lawn.

== Radio show and other media activities ==
Beginning in November 1991, Norman hosted The Connie Norman Show, an evening radio talk show. She was the first gay rights activist to host a daily talk show about gay issues on a commercial Los Angeles-area station, and the Los Angeles Times said the show "pioneered commercial radio talk shows" about gay issues. Norman said "If we're going to have an argument, it should be amongst our family. It should not be a heterosexual person having the token argument or the token discussion for us."

Norman also co-hosted a weekly cable television show, and wrote columns for the San Diego newspaper Update and the gay publication Stonewall Speaks. She acted in the film Wrecked for Life, and performed in the theatrical productions An Evening with Connie Norman and AIDS Us Women.

== Personal life, death, and legacy ==
Norman was born in Texas, had a difficult childhood, and ran away from home at age 14, moving to the streets of Hollywood. She was transsexual, and had sex reassignment surgery in 1976. She was diagnosed with HIV in 1987.

Norman lived with her husband Bruce Norman and five cats. She died from complications of AIDS at age 47, on July 15, 1996, in Los Angeles. ACT UP stated she had been "murdered by AIDS and killed by government neglect" and inaction on HIV. The Connie Norman Award for Excellence in the Movement is awarded in her honor.

In 2021, Dante Alencastre produced a documentary about Norman, "AIDS DIVA: The Legend of Connie Norman", using archival footage from one of her friends and ACT UP colleagues. The documentary covers Norman's place in the AIDS and gay rights activism movements and traces the links between that activism in the 1980s and more recent movements for equality. John Jude Duran is writing a musical about Norman.

In 2021, the Connie Norman Transgender Empowerment Center, which includes a food bank and clothing closet, opened in Los Angeles as a project of the AIDS Healthcare Foundation (AHF), Flux (a trans rights group) and the Unique Women's Coalition (a Black trans group); the latter two are set to be based out of the center, and the AHF will operate a healthcare facility there. The site, named in Norman's honor, will house her childhood teddy bear.

She is one of many commemorated by the AIDS Quilt.
