= Verbatim (album) =

Studio album by Bob Ostertag
- Released: May 1996
- Recorded: 1996
- Studio: Various: ORF; (Vienna, Austria); Wheeler Auditorium; (Berkeley, CA)
- Genre: Experimental
- Length: 42:07
- Label: Rastascan

Bob Ostertag chronology
Twins! (1996)	Verbatim (1996)	Like a Melody, No Bitterness (1998)

Verbatim is the fifth studio album by Bob Ostertag, released in May 1996 by Rastascan Records.

== Reception ==
Professional ratings
Review scores
Source	Rating
AllMusic	3/5 stars

Dean McFarlane of AllMusic gave the Verbatim three out of five possible stars, saying "the work is a vital and highly experimental composition that challenges the concepts of improvisation and composition."

== Track listing ==
All tracks are written by Bob Ostertag.

No.	Title	Length
1.	"Periwinkle"	9:05
2.	"Oxblood"	1:47
3.	"Smoke"	4:28
4.	"Ink"	8:34
5.	"Cornflower"	3:11
6.	"Paris Green"	5:26
7.	"Middle Stone"	3:28
8.	"Lavender"	3:25
9.	"Ash"	2:43

== Personnel ==
Adapted from the Verbatim liner notes.

Musicians

- Bob Ostertag – Ensoniq ASR-10 sampler, Emagic's Logic Audio And Macromedia's Deck II

Additional musicians

- Mark Dresser – contrabass
- Phil Minton – vocals
- Gerry Hemingway – percussion

Production and design

- D-L Alvarez – cover art, design

== Release history ==
Region	Date	Label	Format	Catalog
United States	1996	Rastascan	CD	SEELAND 508
Europe	1997	Red Note	CD	REDNOTE6
