= Fear No Love =

Studio album by Bob Ostertag
- Released: February 18, 1995
- Recorded: spring – summer 1994
- Studio: Bob's bedroom
- Genre: Experimental
- Length: 49:18
- Label: Avant

Bob Ostertag chronology
All the Rage (1993)	Fear No Love (1995)	Twins! (1996)

Fear No Love is the fourth studio album by Bob Ostertag, released on February 18, 1995, by Avant Records. The album's concept deals with the phobias surrounding queer love including fear of intimacy, fear of gender, fear of stereotypes, fear of AIDS, fear of rejection and fear of fear.

== Reception ==
Professional ratings
Review scores
Source	Rating
AllMusic	3.5/5 stars

Dean McFarlane of AllMusic noted the surrealism and black humor of Fear No Love and awarded the album three and a half out of five stars, saying "those expecting a heady avant-garde experiment may be shocked to find this record to be a hilarious plunderphonic sampling attack on disco, techno, and R&B music." The Wire gave the album a positive review, saying "Ostertag's method of computeranatomising his colleagues' contributions into samples and mechanically constructing songs out of them is more than usually redundant on this only mildly diverting, dirty talking and dotty pseudofunk outing." The Advocate said "there's an intensely homo sense of humor and humanity at work that enlivens the experimentation."

== Track listing ==
All tracks are written by Sarah Miles, except "Scared of Love" by Christian Huygen.

No.	Title	Length
1.	"Scared of Love"	8:23
2.	"The Man in the Blue Slip"	10:50
3.	"Eat Dust"	4:44
4.	"Not Your Girl"	6:00
5.	"Right Like a Railroad"	10:27
6.	"Positive"	8:55

== Personnel ==
Adapted from the Fear No Love liner notes.

Musicians

- Trevor Dunn – bass guitar (1, 3, 4)
- Fred Frith – bass guitar (2, 4, 6))
- Bob Ostertag – programming, arrangements, sampler (1, 2, 3, 5), bass guitar (1, 4), drums (1, 5), midi drums (2–4), synthesizer (2, 4, 6), guitar (2, 4), MIDI keyboard (1), percussion (1), midi bass (5), midi percussion (6)
- J. D. Reilley – keyboards (1, 2, 4, 6)

Additional musicians

- Joey Blake – backing vocals (6)
- Justin Bond – vocals (2, 4)
- Lynn Breedlove – vocals (3, 4)
- Chris Brown – sampler (3)
- Fred Frith – guitar (2, 5)
- Jim Hedges – guitar (1, 2)
- Philip Horvitz – vocals (4)
- Christian Huygen – vocals (1)
- Raz Kennedy – backing vocals (6)
- Andrea Lewis – backing vocals (1), vocals (5)
- Mike Patton – vocals (2, 4)
- Annie Toone – harmonica (4, 5)
- Richie Waits – vocals (5)
- William Winant – percussion (2)

Production and design

- Phyllis Christopher – photography
- Disk Union – executive-producer
- Pamela August Russell – photography
- Alex Stahl – mixing
- Kazunori Sugiyama – associate producer
- John Zorn – executive-producer

== Release history ==
Region	Date	Label	Format	Catalog
Japan	1995	Avant	CD	Avan 041
United States	2010	Free Music Archive	DL	
