= Antediluvian Rocking Horse =

Australian musical group

Antediluvian Rocking Horse (ARH), formed 1994 St. Kilda, Australia, is an audio project maintained by two core artists credited as DJ2 and DJ3. DJ2 is Paul Wain, a sculptor and graduate of the Victorian College of the Arts. DJ3 is Susan King, a collage artist, writer and anti-copyright advocate. The composer Ollie Olsen was also a member. The project produces music and soundscapes that are entirely recycled from other recorded works.

== Anti-copyright ==
Copyright is an unambiguous focus for the project. Its work in multi-source soundscapes and ambient mashup is informed by appropriation and wilful detournement. Like The Evolution Control Committee, with whom the project has performed, Antediluvian Rocking Horse does not seek permission for use of samples.

King addressed the eighth biennial Copyright Law & Practice Symposium on 7 November 1997 on the topic of fair dealing for copyrighted materials in art. In a lecture delivered to then Attorney-General of Australia, Daryl Williams, she argued that the re-use of culture should be encouraged, not hindered and litigated. In the 21 March 1998 edition of the Sydney Morning Herald, King was interviewed and described as Australia's "lone voice of dissent" in her public call for the diminution of copyright law. At around this time, King also assisted Negativland in its campaign to sue the RIAA.

The project insists that all of its works are "one hundred per cent recycled". This is apparent in pieces like "September Shuffle", a track that uses excerpts from Fox News, The Pixies and, possibly, the KLF.

ARH actively defies copyright law and to promote fair use within its pieces. One contribution was to the Illegal Art MP3 exhibit Alias Frequencies.

In 2003, King told The Age newspaper that the "remix" was nothing new and that appropriation inhered in the production of all artworks.

== Dada influence ==
The pair takes further inspiration from Dada and Situationist texts and practises. ("Dada" is a term employed by French children to signify hobby horse. This translation, presumably, provided the spur for the project's name.) Matthew Rimmer interviewed the project for his doctoral thesis, "The Pirate Bazaar: The Social Life of Copyright Law". He noted a distinction between the clearly political anti-copyright agenda of Negativland and the Dada humour of Antediluvian Rocking Horse. It was Rimmer's contention that the project chooses psychedelic mischief over lucid political action.

In September 2006, DJ3 (King) performed new works at Psy-Geo-Conflux, the annual situationist festival of psychogeography in New York City. This preoccupation with the psychogeography of Guy Debord continued with a project called Aural Maps which is a serial artwork seeking to navigate situations through sound.

Through unpacking the familiar, we chart our scope of reference, and consider how sound delineates space and creates patterns of movement, both physically and creatively.

== Techno ==
ARH sprang out of the techno culture of the early 1990s. The project was embraced by techno media, with positive mentions in notable publications.

== Collaborations ==
Antediluvian Rocking Horse has collaborated with the Australian composer Ollie Olsen. It has collaborated in live performance with Damo Suzuki of Can.

ARH has worked with the psychedelic Japanese project Boredoms.

== Releases ==
The project's first CD, Music for the Odd Occasion, was the first non-US signing to Negativland's Seeland Records label. This work appeared at 150 in issue 520 of the CMJ New Music Report. In Australia, the record was available from the trance label, Psy-Harmonics.

The project released Music for Transportation on the Japanese label musicmine. Forward into the Furniture was released on their own label Start Transmission, in addition to various compilation tracks over the years.
