= Ensoniq EPS-16 Plus =

Digital musical instrument

EPS-16 Plus
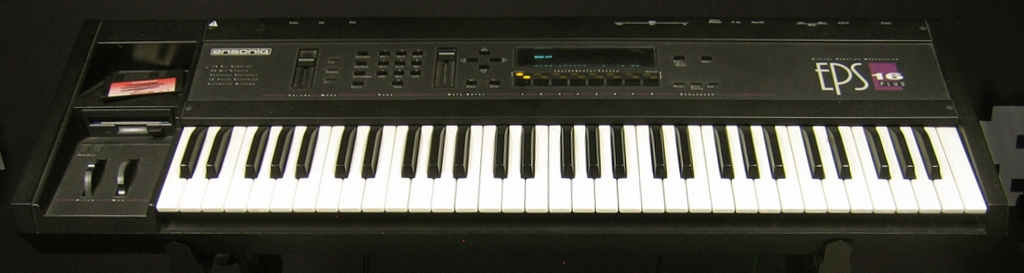
- Ensoniq EPS-16 Plus (keyboard)
- Manufacturer: Ensoniq
- Dates: 1990–199x
- Price: £1795

Technical specifications
- Polyphony: 20 voices
- Synthesis type: 16-bit samples, 11.2 kHz–44.6 kHz
- Aftertouch expression: Yes
- Velocity expression: Yes
- Storage memory: 1 MB, expandable to 2 MB (2 MB RAM, 2 MB internal flash memory on "Turbo" units)
- Effects: 13 onboard effects

Input/output
- Keyboard: 61-note with polyphonic aftertouch
- Left-hand control: pitch-bend and modulation wheels
- External control: MIDI

The Ensoniq EPS-16 Plus is a sampling keyboard produced by Ensoniq starting in 1990. It was the second generation of the EPS, one of the first truly affordable samplers on the market. The EPS-16 Plus uses 16-bit samples at seven sample rates ranging from 11.2 kHz to 44.6 kHz and features 13 onboard effects. The unit was available in both keyboard and rackmount versions (EPS-16R). Some versions of the EPS-16 Plus were sold as "Turbo" units, which included an extra 2 MB of internal flash memory and SCSI upgrades. These units are designated with a "T" after the model number.

The EPS-16 Plus features a mono input and stereo outputs, made useful by the unit's stereo panning and internal effects.

It was succeeded in 1992 by the stereo-capable ASR-10.

== Notable users ==
Notable users include Havoc of Mobb Deep, RZA of the Wu-Tang Clan as well as Wu-Tang affiliate True Master, Speech of Arrested Development and Christian "Flake" Lorenz of Rammstein.

De facto Wu-Tang Clan leader RZA produced some tracks for the group's debut album Enter the Wu-Tang (36 Chambers) on an EPS-16 Plus, including their biggest single "C.R.E.A.M.". He then sold the unit to True Master, who used it to produce "Fish" from Ghostface Killah's debut solo album Ironman as well as "Brooklyn Zoo" from Ol' Dirty Bastard's debut solo album Return to the 36 Chambers: The Dirty Version. Havoc of Mobb Deep has stated that he produced "Shook Ones, Part II" an EPS-16 Plus. (Note: The main samples were done on an EPS-16 Plus while the drums were done on an Akai MPC60.)

== Accessories ==
=== ME-16 Plus ===
This accessory increases the non-volatile RAM of the Ensoniq EPS-16 Plus to 2MB. It was available as a cartridge, for the keyboard version, and as a board, for the rack version. This would double the sample time, and the sequencer memory could now load around 320000 notes.

=== SP-1/SP-2 ===
This expansion board adds a SCSI interface to the EPS-16 Plus. This allows you to connect your Ensoniq to an external CD-Rom drive and use the Ensoniq CDR collection or other CD-Roms, to an external Hard Drive, or into an Apple Macintosh. For the keyboard version, the user needs to have the ME-16 Plus expansion installed, because it has the cutouts for the SCSI bus. It came with a standard IDE 34 pin cable, and a DB25 female connector to IDE 26 pin cable.

=== FB-1/FB-2 (Flashbank) ===
This expansion board adds internal flash storage into the Ensoniq EPS-16 Plus. It would add 512KB with the FB-1, and 1MB for the FB-2. This was extremely versatile, because every file it would load in the Ensoniq EPS-16 Plus, in addition to being super fast loading them, it would also not use any of the non-volatile RAM present in the Ensoniq EPS-16 Plus. Also, all the files the user would save in the Flashbank would stay there even when the Ensoniq was turned off. It came with a standard IDE 50 pin connector cable.

=== OEX-6 ===
This expansion adds 6 more output buses to the Ensoniq EPS-16 Plus. This would come installed internally in the rack version. This was useful in case the user wanted some of their instruments or the sequencer click come out from an other channel in your mixer for example.

=== ED, ESS, SL and SLT Sound Libraries ===
These are sound libraries that came in floppies for the Ensoniq EPS-16 Plus.

=== CDR and SCD Sound Libraries ===
These are sound libraries that came in CD-Roms for the Ensoniq EPS-16 Plus.
