= I Wish You Were Here =

I wish you were here may refer to:

- Zaion: I Wish You Were Here, a Japanese anime video animation
- "I Wish You Were Here", a song by Matchbook Romance on their 2006 album Voices
- "I Wish You Were Here", a 2001 hit underground house music song by John Creamer & Stephane K ft. Nkemdi
- "I Wish You Were Here", a song by Offer Nissim featuring Maya Simantov
- "I Wish You Were Here", a song by Simple Minds on their 1985 album Once Upon a Time
- "I Wish You Were Here", a song by Al Green on his 1975 album Al Green Is Love.

== See also ==
- Wish You Were Here (disambiguation)
