= A Book of Hours =

Studio album by Bob Ostertag
- Released: June 9, 2013
- Genre: Free Improvisation
- Length: 50:06

Bob Ostertag chronology
Motormouth Variations (2011)	A Book of Hours (2013)	Bob Ostertag Plays the Aalto (2013)

A Book of Hours is the tenth studio album by Bob Ostertag, self-released on June 9, 2013.

== Track listing ==
All tracks are written by Bob Ostertag.

No.	Title	Length
1.	"Tremble But Do Not Despair"	14:28
2.	"The Poor Shall Eat All They Want"	11:22
3.	"I Will Guide You With My Eye"	17:09
4.	"So I Can Wake Up the Dawn"	7:07

== Personnel ==
Adapted from the A Book of Hours liner notes.

Musicians

- Bob Ostertag – sampler

Additional musicians

- Theo Bleckmann – voice
- Shelley Hirsch – voice
- Phil Minton – voice
- Roscoe Mitchell – saxophone

== Release history ==
Region	Date	Label	Format	Catalog
United States	2013		DL	
