= Night Prayers =

Studio album by Kronos Quartet
- Released: 2 September 1994
- Recorded: 1992–1994
- Genre: Contemporary classical
- Label: Nonesuch (#79346)
- Producer: Judith Sherman

Kronos Quartet chronology
Bob Ostertag: All the Rage (1993)	Night Prayers (1994)	Kronos Quartet Performs Philip Glass (1993)

Night Prayers is a studio album by the Kronos Quartet. It contains commissioned pieces with music from former Soviet republics in Eastern Europe and Central Asia, and includes performances by Throat Singers of Tuva, Dawn Upshaw (soprano), Djivan Gasparyan (duduk), and Mikhail Alexandrovich (cantor).

== Track listing ==
No.	Title	Writer(s)	Length
1.	"Kongerei"	Trad., arr. Steven Mackey	3:38
2.	"Lacrymosa"	Dmitri Yanov-Yanovsky	6:01
3.	"Mugam Sayagi"	Franghiz Ali-Zadeh	21:16
4.	"Quartet No. 4"	Sofia Gubaidulina	11:46
5.	"A Cool Wind is Blowing"	Tigran Tahmizyan	3:56
6.	"K'Vakarat"	Osvaldo Golijov	8:09
7.	"Night Prayers"	Giya Kancheli	23:14

== Personnel ==
=== Musicians ===
- David Harrington – violin
- John Sherba – violin
- Hank Dutt – viola
- Joan Jeanrenaud – cello
- Throat Singers of Tuva (track 1)
  - Kaigal-ool Khovalyg
  - Anatoly Kuular
  - Kongar-ol Ondar
- Dawn Upshaw – soprano (track 2)
- Djivan Gasparyan – duduk (track 5)
- Mikhail Alexandrovich – cantor (track 6)

=== Production ===
- Recorded at Skywalker Sound, Nicasio, California; The American Academy of Arts and Letters, New York, New York; and Mechanics Hall, Worcester, Massachusetts
  - Judith Sherman, Kronos Quartet – Producers
  - Robert Hurwitz – Executive producer
  - Joseph Chilorio – Engineer (tracks 4, 6)
  - Bob Edwards – Engineer (tracks 1, 7)
  - Judith Sherman – Engineer (tracks 2–6)
  - Craig Silvey – Engineer (tracks 3–5)
  - Paul Zinman – Engineer (track 2)
  - Mark Donahue – Assistant engineer (track 4)
  - Chris Haynes – Assistant engineer (tracks 4, 5)
  - Tom Luekens – Assistant engineer (tracks 1, 3)
  - Craig Silvey – Assistant engineer (track 7)
- David Wojnarowicz – Cover
- Frank Olinsky – Design

== See also ==
- List of 1994 albums
