= W00t (Bob Ostertag album) =

w00t

Studio album by Bob Ostertag
- Released: October 15, 2007
- Genre: Sound collage
- Length: 50:15

Bob Ostertag chronology
DJ of the Month (2002)	w00t (2007)	Motormouth (2011)

w00t is the eighth studio album by Bob Ostertag, self-released on October 15, 2007.

== Reception ==
TheStreet.com gave w00t a positive review, saying "shards of sounds are recombined here to create original musical phrases -- more like a mosaic than a collage" and "the features of the sampled sounds are recognizable, even as the sounds are turned from their intended purpose -- elevated, the way words are elevated into poetry."

== Track listing ==
All tracks are written by Bob Ostertag.

No.	Title	Length
1.	"w00t"	50:15

== Personnel ==
Adapted from the w00t liner notes.

Musicians

- Bob Ostertag – sampler

Production and design

- John Cooney – cover art

== Release history ==
Region	Date	Label	Format	Catalog
United States	2006		DL	
United States	2009		DL	
