= WYWH =

WYWH may refer to:

- WYWH-LP, a low-power radio station (104.5 FM) licensed to Athens, Ohio, United States
- WYWH, a 2010 album by The Concretes, or the title song
- Wish You Were Here (disambiguation), several uses
