= Motormouth: Bob Ostertag Plays the Buchla 200e =

Studio album by Bob Ostertag
- Released: February 1, 2011
- Genre: Experimental
- Length: 38:18

Bob Ostertag chronology
w00t (2007)	Motormouth: Bob Ostertag Plays the Buchla 200e (2011)	Motormouth Variations (2011)

Motormouth: Bob Ostertag Plays the Buchla 200e is the ninth studio album by Bob Ostertag, released on February 1, 2011 by Seeland Records.

== Track listing ==
All tracks are written by Bob Ostertag.

No.	Title	Length
1.	"Shadow Pocket"	5:48
2.	"Wack"	1:03
3.	"Arms and Legs"	4:52
4.	"Hymenoptera"	1:47
5.	"Motormouth"	8:51
6.	"Affairs of State"	2:49
7.	"Pointillism"	10:17
8.	"Tickled Pink"	2:51

== Personnel ==
Adapted from the Motormouth: Bob Ostertag Plays the Buchla 200e liner notes.

Musicians

- Bob Ostertag – Buchla 200e synthesizer

Production and design

- Alex Culang – cover art, design
- Thomas Dimuzio – mastering (5)

== Release history ==
Region	Date	Label	Format	Catalog
United States	2011		CD, DL	
