= Ensoniq EPS =

Digital musical instrument

EPS
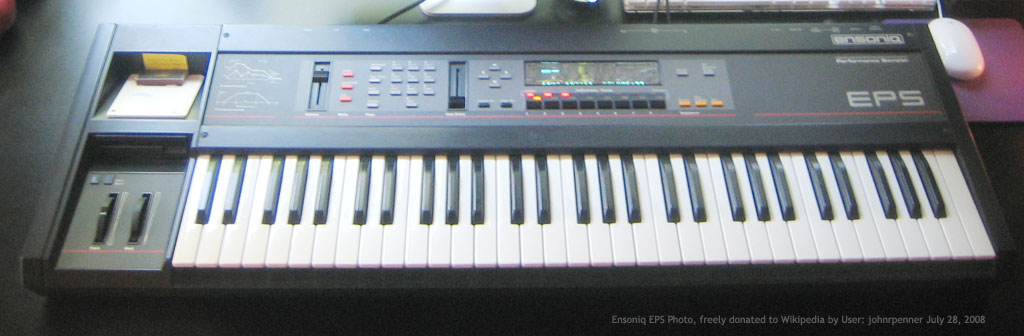
- Ensoniq EPS
- Manufacturer: Ensoniq
- Dates: 1988–1991
- Price: £1695

Technical specifications
- Polyphony: 20 voices
- Synthesis type: 13-bit samples
- Aftertouch expression: Yes
- Velocity expression: Yes
- Effects: none

Input/output
- Keyboard: 61-note with polyphonic aftertouch
- Left-hand control: pitch-bend and modulation wheels
- External control: MIDI

The Ensoniq Performance Sampler (EPS) was one of the first few affordable samplers on the market. It was manufactured from 1988 to 1991 by Ensoniq in Malvern, Pennsylvania, US. The EPS is a 13-bit sampler and replaced the Mirage.

The EPS has a straightforward interface that is easy to use, with configurable controls geared for live performance. Because it has two processors, it can load and play up to eight instruments simultaneously (with another eight on reserve). The display is a 22-character, single-line vacuum fluorescent display. It boots from an integrated floppy disk drive (sourced from Sony or Matsushita), or from a SCSI drive connected to the expansion bay. The EPS has 256 Kwords of RAM on board. Ensoniq offered both a 2x (512 Kword) Memory Expander and a 4x (1 Mword) Memory Expander with SCSI interface. A company called Maartists offered both 4x and 8x memory expanders, allowing a total of 2 Mwords RAM. Extra RAM allows for longer and higher quality samples. The "2x" expander contains one 1x256Kbit and three 4x256Kbit chips, for a total of 13x256Kbits in addition to the onboard memory. The EPS is unusual in having a 13-bit sample memory word length, left-justified into the most significant bits of a 16-bit word.

The EPS uses double-sided, double-density 3.5" disks, formatted to 800k with ten 512-byte sectors per track. It can also read (but not write) Ensoniq Mirage sample disks.

The EPS uses MIDI and can be used as a controller of other instruments or connected to a computer.

The EPS was superseded by the EPS-16 Plus which upgraded the sample size to 16 bits and added a 24-bit effects system. Other improvements include CD-ROM support in the optional SCSI interface and FlashBank storage for the OS and favorite sounds. The ASR-10, launched in 1992 was effectively the third generation of the EPS series, with the original 1988 model now retrospectively known as the "EPS Classic".

== Construction ==
The keyboard is of thick plastic construction using the same case as the SQ-80 and the final generation of the Mirage of a dark gray color with 61 weighted keys. There are assignable pitch, modulation wheels, and two patch select buttons. The interior of the unit is accessed by removing four hex screws under the front of the keyboard and swinging open the rear-hinged control panel.

The whole unit is configurable through a custom operating system (latest version was 2.49 for the EPS and 1.30 for the EPS-16 Plus). After the system boots from the floppy drive, it flashes a "Tuning Keyboard - Hands Off" message while it calibrates its polyphonic after-touch keyboard. The EPS-16 Plus is capable of storing the OS in the optional FlashBank, which removes the need for a boot disk.

An optional Output Expander module allows access to eight discrete mono outputs on the machine, allowing to separately mix levels and effects for each loaded sample.

The key limitations of the EPS were its proprietary disk format, and later a lack of support from Creative Technology, the current owner of Ensoniq. A 19" rack-mount version of both machines were also available in limited numbers.

This model was superseded by the EPS-16 Plus, released in 1991. The EPS-16 Plus is very similar to the EPS. Its main addition is integrated DSP effects and stereo audio routing. Due to the upgrade to 16-bit audio, the Output Expander on the EPS-16 Plus is different, instead providing three pairs of stereo outputs, two from before the new effects chip.

== Use ==
The EPS is a performance sampler. Besides the main processor it contains a dedicated sound engine so that playing can be done whilst loading another sample. The main processor handles the I/O while the sound engine is responsible for keeping the audio running without interruption — this made the EPS especially useful for live performance situations.

The interface, although operating through a single-line fluorescent display, offers rapid access to all functions by the intelligent way that functionality is broken into Modes and Pages.

Modes are: Load, Command, and Edit.

Pages are: Instrument, Sequence, MIDI, and System.

In addition to eight soft instrument buttons, it has a number pad (0-9), four cursor buttons, a value slider, and 'Yes' - 'No' buttons.

The vast majority of functionality can be accessed with less than three clicks: Mode - Page - Number Pad.

There is also a dedicated button for Sampling, and three for the built-in sequencer. The EPS-16 Plus also has a dedicated button for configuring the effects DSP.

Easter Egg: There is a hidden menu in the Command-ENV1 page which contains Software Information, the names of the designers, a DC Offset Adjustment, and a keyboard calibration command.

=== Instrument ===
Instrument pages are prefixed by clicking a Mode (Load, Command, or Edit) -- yielding functions relating to loading, editing, and tweaking EPS sampled instruments. Instruments can contain a number of discrete samples which are patched into Layers - each with their own ADSR-like envelopes and keyboard ranges. A loop editor allows you to define envelopes, cross-fades, and sample start-end, and loop points in real-time. It is possible to modulate the loop start with any source to give complex evolving sounds. On the EPS-16 Plus, the Transwave loop mode allows the start point to be modulated in exact "single-cycle" steps, giving effects similar to the PPG Wave. The Ensoniq manuals were famous for including quality tutorials for sampling and editing new sounds.

=== Sequence ===
The Sequence pages allow you to define sequences and songs. Simple quantization is available, along with a crude, but effective, step-editor to tweak individual sequence elements. Sequences (with up to eight instruments playing simultaneously) can be assembled into Song Steps. In assembling songs, you can define the number of repetitions of each sequence that comprises a song step. This makes it relatively easy to score and arrange a song.

Sequences depend on having instruments loaded into one of the eight instrument banks in the right order. Banks of instruments can be saved which can be loaded in by a song sequence so that loading the song loads all the appropriate sounds into the right places so everything will play when you start the sequencer. In the EPS-16 Plus, an effect is also assigned to a bank.

=== MIDI ===
The EPS supports polyphonic-aftertouch on its 61 keys, and therefore allows a fair amount of expression as a MIDI controller. Sys-ex messages are supported over MIDI, and can transmit and receive on multiple MIDI channels simultaneously.

=== System ===
By using a dedicated sound engine in addition to the main processor, sound generation and disk I/O are handled separately. This allows so-called load-while-play, a feature quite unique at the time. The user can boot the EPS and load some sounds while playing the ones that are already loaded. Then sample in a new sound, only to find that you're out of floppies to save your new sample to — the EPS OS will allow you to go ahead, format another floppy disk, and save your new sound without the system function getting in the way of playing the audio.

True to their user-oriented approach, the EPS boot disk not only contains everything needed to run the sampler, but also a tiny operating system with the ability to create a bootable version of itself. This was an improvement on the earlier Mirage sampler, which required a special boot disk with a formatting program, and could not make copies of its own boot disks.
