= Wish You Were Here (Bob Ostertag album) =

Studio album by Bob Ostertag
- Released: October 12, 2016
- Recorded: March 2014 – April 2016
- Genre: Experimental; electronic
- Length: 40:01

Bob Ostertag chronology
Bob Ostertag Plays the Serge 1978-1983 (2014)	Wish You Were Here (2016)

Wish You Were Here is the thirteenth studio album by electronic/experimental musician Bob Ostertag, self-released on October 12, 2016.

== Track listing ==
All tracks are written by Bob Ostertag.

No.	Title	Length
1.	"Wish You Were Here"	40:01

== Personnel ==
Adapted from the Wish You Were Here liner notes.

Musicians

- Randy Jones – Aalto synthesizer
- Bob Ostertag – sampler

Production and design

- Rutger Zuydervelt – cover art

== Release history ==
Region	Date	Label	Format	Catalog
United States	2016		DL	
