= Attention Span (album) =

Studio album by Ostertag with Zorn with Frith
- Released: 1990
- Recorded: September – December 1989
- Studio: Various: The Knitting Factory; (New York City, New York); Mills College; (Oakland, California)
- Genre: experimental; sound collage
- Length: 45:21
- Label: RecRec

Bob Ostertag chronology
Voice of America (1982)	Attention Span (1990)	Sooner or Later (1991)

Fred Frith chronology
Step Across the Border (1990)	Attention Span (1990)	Dropera (1991)

John Zorn chronology
Naked City (1990)	Attention Span (1990)	Torture Garden (1991)

Attention Span is a collaborative album by Bob Ostertag, Fred Frith and John Zorn, released in 1990 by RecRec Music.

== Reception ==
Professional ratings
Review scores
Source	Rating
AllMusic	3/5 stars

Ted Mills of AllMusic said of Attention Span that it is "not as cohesive as some of his other, more conceptual works (sometimes you wonder if the whole thing is a favor to his fellow artists), but certainly not without worth."

== Track listing ==
No.	Title	Music	Length
1.	"Power"	Ostertag, Zorn	1:07
2.	"Paper Jam"	Ostertag, Zorn	0:16
3.	"Warning"	Ostertag, Zorn	0:25
4.	"And Gate"	Ostertag, Zorn	0:10
5.	"Necker Cube"	Ostertag, Zorn	0:56
6.	"Fold"	Ostertag, Zorn	1:06
7.	"Ebb Tide"	Ostertag, Zorn	0:51
8.	"Marketing Research"	Ostertag, Zorn	0:21
9.	"Fixed Resistor"	Ostertag, Zorn	0:17
10.	"Radiant Power"	Ostertag, Zorn	1:14
11.	"Depth Reversal"	Ostertag, Zorn	0:21
12.	"Dangerous Zone"	Ostertag, Zorn	0:37
13.	"Hit the Road"	Ostertag, Zorn	0:21
14.	"Smoking"	Ostertag, Zorn	1:55
15.	"Waiting"	Ostertag, Zorn	1:31
16.	"Electric Flux"	Ostertag, Zorn	0:36
17.	"Cocktail Lounge"	Ostertag, Zorn	0:35
18.	"Coat Check"	Ostertag, Zorn	1:05
19.	"Detour"	Ostertag, Zorn	0:24
20.	"Meter"	Ostertag, Zorn	0:59
21.	"Circuit Breaker"	Ostertag, Zorn	1:11
22.	"Surge Impendence"	Ostertag, Zorn	0:40
23.	"Vision"	Ostertag, Zorn	1:57
24.	"Black, To a Chimp"	Ostertag, Zorn	0:20
25.	"Neon"	Ostertag, Zorn	1:00
26.	"Emergency Shop"	Ostertag, Zorn	3:14
27.	"Flame"	Frith, Ostertag	1:54
28.	"Bone"	Frith, Ostertag	5:39
29.	"Jolt"	Frith, Ostertag	6:03
30.	"Bolt"	Frith, Ostertag	4:37
31.	"Loops"	Frith, Ostertag	0:56
32.	"Drowning Offshore"	Frith, Ostertag	2:43

== Personnel ==
Adapted from the Attention Span liner notes.

Musicians

- Fred Frith – guitar (1-26)
- Bob Ostertag – sampler, liner notes
- John Zorn – alto saxophone (1-26)

Production and design

- Bob Appel – engineering
- Douglas Kenny – cover art, design
- Jonathan Nelson – engineering
- Diego Zweifel – design

== Release history ==
Region	Date	Label	Format	Catalog
Switzerland	1990	RecRec	CD	ReCDec 33
