= Say No More (Bob Ostertag album) =

Studio album by Bob Ostertag
- Released: 1993
- Genre: Experimental; free improvisation
- Length: 38:23
- Label: RecRec

Bob Ostertag chronology
Burns Like Fire (1992)	Say No More (1993)	Say No More in Person (1993)

Say No More is the third studio album by Bob Ostertag, released in 1993 by RecRec Music.

== Reception ==
Professional ratings
Review scores
Source	Rating
AllMusic	4.5/5 stars

François Couture of AllMusic called Say No More "a classic" and "the border between free improvisation and musique concrete will never be the same." Musicworks gave the album a positive review, saying "the practice of sampling sounds creates its own contextual questions, of course, and those posed by Bob Ostertag were the most puzzling."

== Track listing ==
No.	Title	Writer(s)	Length
1.	"Say No More"	Baron, Dresser, Minton, Ostertag	21:01
2.	"Tongue-Tied"	Dresser, Hemingway, Minton, Ostertag	17:22

== Personnel ==
Adapted from the Say No More liner notes.

Musicians

- Joey Baron – percussion (1)
- Mark Dresser – bass guitar
- Gerry Hemingway – percussion (2)
- Phil Minton – voice
- Bob Ostertag – sampler

Production and design

- Ilia Vasella – design
- David Wojnarowicz – photography

== Release history ==
Region	Date	Label	Format	Catalog
Switzerland	1993	RecRec	CD	ReCDec 59
