= AB101 Veto Riot =

1991 riot in San Francisco, California

- Date: September 30, 1991
- Time: Evening
- Location: San Francisco, California

The AB101 Veto Riot was a riot that occurred on September 30, 1991, in San Francisco, California, that was organized originally as a peaceful protest; the gathering was initially proposed by activists Gerard Koskovich and Bob Smith, who were joined by other community organizers just before the event. The riot started as a response to Pete Wilson, the governor of California at the time, vetoing Assembly Bill 101. The bill would have prohibited private employers from discriminating against employees because of their sexual orientation. A year after the protest, in 1992, the bill was passed by state legislature and signed by Pete Wilson.

== Background ==
Many gay organizations including ACT UP had worked to get AB101 through the legislature, with Rob Roberts and Connie Norman participating in a hunger strike. These organizations expected the bill would be made law, particularly because Wilson had promised during an electoral campaign to sign it. When he ultimately vetoed it, it was widely condemned as dishonest by the LGBT community of California.

Wilson said he vetoed the bill out of fear that it would be harmful to businesses from potential increases in lawsuits and would make California overall less competitive economically. In addition, he questioned the need for the bill, claiming there were already laws protecting gay employees from discrimination. However, some political observers have argued that he decided to veto the bill due to pressure from religious right organizations and conservatives that he needed the continued support of to help fund his re-election campaign.

Before Wilson acted, Koskovich and Smith realized that no public gathering was planned to respond to when Wilson either signed or vetoed the bill. In response, they planned an organized assembly by producing flyers asking that people gather in the Castro District regardless to either celebrate if the bill was signed or protest if the bill was vetoed.

== Riot ==
Organizers of the protest rented a flatbed truck with a sound system to serve as a stage for the protest. They did not request police permits for the gathering. The truck was parked on Castro Street near Harvey Milk Plaza, with protesters massing on Castro Street between 17th and 18th streets. According to Koskovich, around 8,000-10,000 people took part.

Former San Francisco police chief Frank Jordan attended the protest in the Castro. According to Koskovich, Jordan showed up in an attempt to gain publicity and earn more votes, as he was running for Mayor of San Francisco at the time. However, a group of militant protesters angered by the antigay actions of the San Francisco Police Department under his leadership chased him out of the neighborhood, leading him to lose one of his black tassel loafers during the struggle. The shoe was retrieved by a protester and subsequently displayed briefly at A Different Light, the gay bookstore on Castro Street. The loafer is now in the collection of the GLBT Historical Society.

When the organizers planned the event, they agreed to march to the New State Building, a California State office building located on Van Ness Avenue at the corner of McAllister Street. Koskovich said that he never incited anyone to destroy property and was fearful that the protest would lead to violence against local businesses not directly affiliated with the government of California. Because of this, organizers determined that a state office building would be a more appropriate place to channel potential violence if it did occur.

The march made its first stop as planned at the New State Building, where a rally took place with further speakers addressing the crowd. The protesters then marched to the Old State Office Building, another California State administrative center located two blocks away on Golden Gate Avenue at the corner of McAllister Street.

When protesters arrived, there were only three police barricades and eight SFPD officers outside and several California State Police (CSP, now part of the California Highway Patrol) personnel inside. It was difficult for any other SFPD officers to respond due to the fact that the crowd of protesters had surrounded the building. The eight San Francisco Police officers reacted by going inside the building, as their position outside became untenable. This caused the protest to move forward, as several windows of the building were smashed and a corner of the building was lit on fire.

The eight SFPD officers were told to leave the State Building by their supervisors but stayed and assisted State Police Captain Glenn Della-Monica and his small group of officers. The fire hoses used to put out the fires started by the demonstrators were also used to keep them outside the demolished Golden Gate Avenue entrance to the building.

The entrance that was demolished included a stained-glass art piece commissioned by the Governor Jerry Brown administration entitled "Power of the Sun"; a photograph of protesters smashing the window appeared in the next day's edition of the San Francisco Examiner. The paper also noted that the demonstrators burned the appeal documents from many injured workers when they torched the corner office they mistakenly thought was the Governor's office. It was the Workers Compensation Appeals Board District Office.

The newspaper published a photo of demonstrators climbing police barricades, which they used as impromptu ladders to set fire to that office.

Koskovich stated that he was not involved in any property destruction that occurred, saying he was near the back of the crowd acting as a legal observer.

== Aftermath ==
State Assemblyman Terry Friedman condemned the riots, claiming that they would make passing the bill much more difficult. Friedman sent telegrams to leaders of various gay and lesbian groups asking them to stop violent demonstrations against the veto and asked California law enforcement to arrest rioters that threatened the safety of property and other people. Mark Weinstein, a spokesperson for the Gay and Lesbian Townhall of California, responded to claims condemning the riots, saying:

We've been told to wait for our freedom for decades and we're not waiting any more... We waited patiently for the governor to sign the bill and he didn't. People have to understand. We're fighting for our lives. This is not an opinion poll.

Protests against the veto continued in Los Angeles, at Stanford University and elsewhere, although on a smaller-scale than the initial riot. Weinstein called for another march to the capital on National Coming Out Day, a two-day boycott towards retail stores during Thanksgiving weekend, and a homosexual rights ballot initiative to let California voters decide rather than the California legislature and governor.

Steve Martin, the president of the Stonewall Gay Democratic Club in Los Angeles, reported that homosexual Republicans involved in his organization were re-registering to voting Democrats at a rate of "40 to 60 per day" in response to Wilson's veto of the bill.

A year after the protest in 1992, Assembly Bill 101 was passed by state legislature and signed by Pete Wilson.
