= Serge synthesizer =

Analogue modular synthesizer

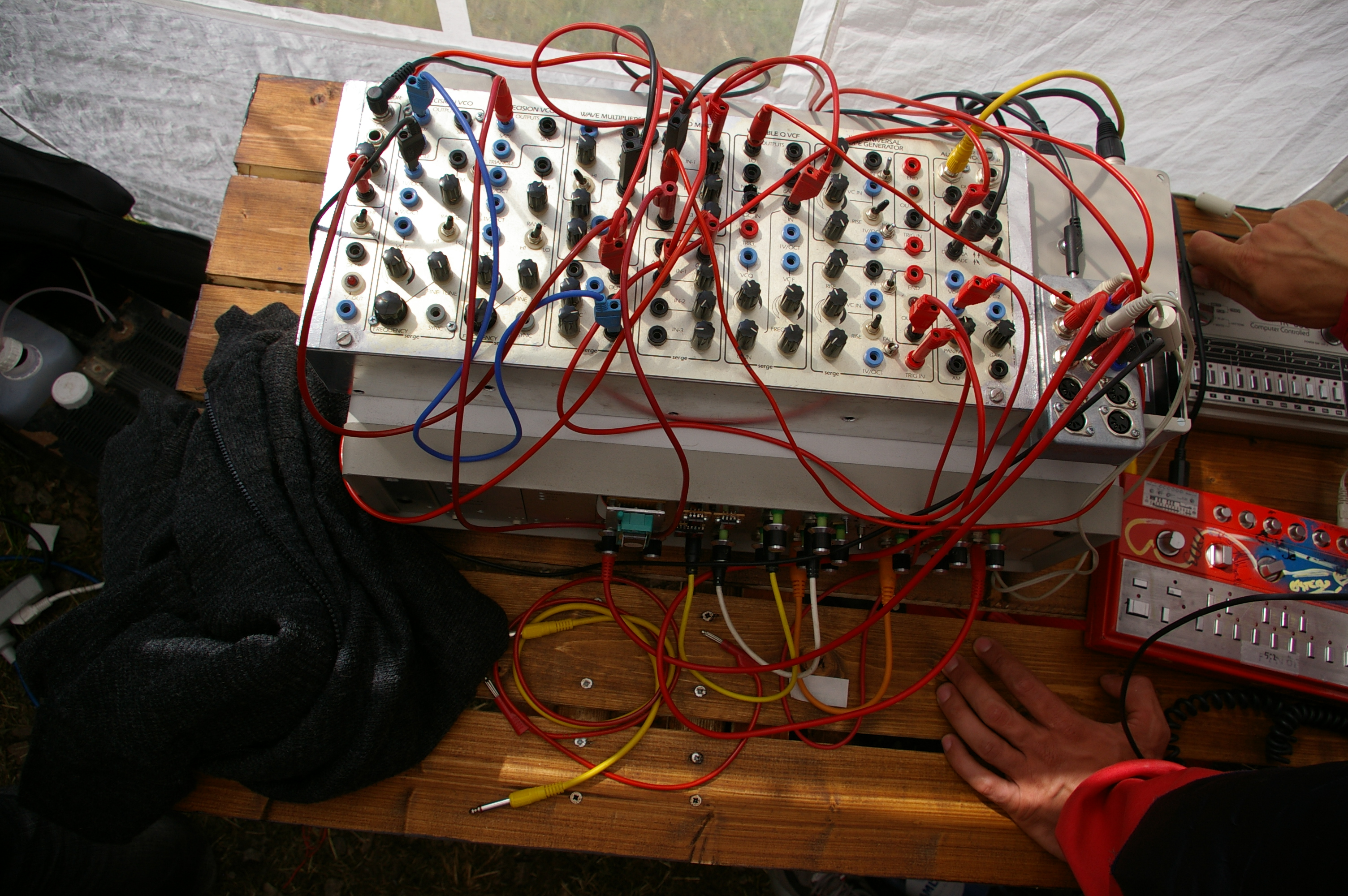
Serge Modular

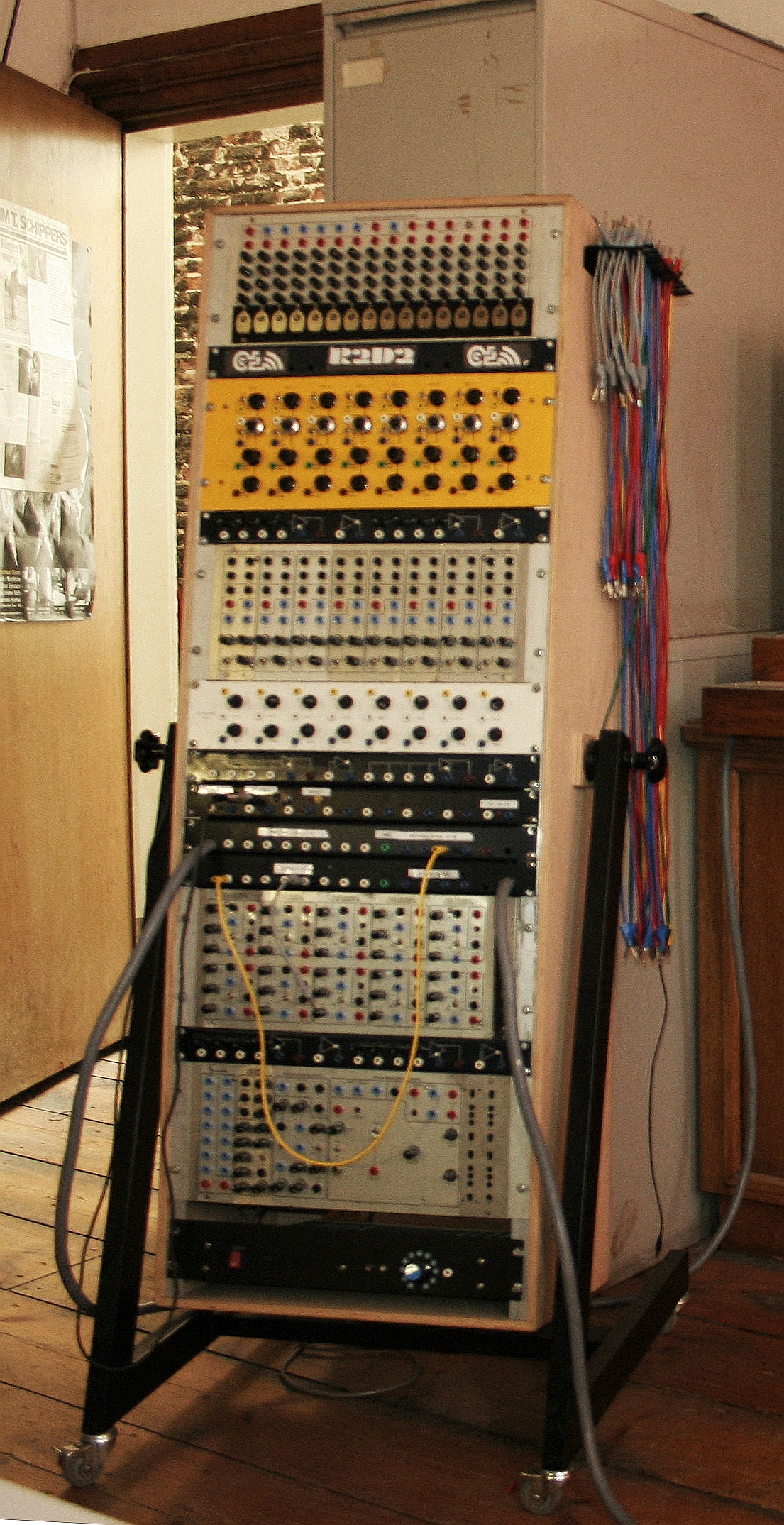
Serge Modulars in the rack

The Serge synthesizer (a.k.a. Serge Modular or Serge Modular Music System) is an analogue modular synthesizer system originally developed by Serge Tcherepnin, Rich Gold and Randy Cohen at CalArts in late 1972. The first 20 Serge systems (then called "Tcherepnins") were built in 1973 in Tcherepnin's home. Tcherepnin was a professor at CalArts at the time, and desired to create something like the exclusively expensive Buchla modular synthesizers "for the people that would be both inexpensive and powerful." After building prototypes, Tcherepnin went on to develop kits for students to affordably build their own modular synthesizer, production taking place unofficially on a second floor CalArts balcony. This led to Tcherepnin leaving CalArts in order to produce synths commercially, starting in 1974.

After leaving CalArts, Serge had a small factory on Western Avenue in Hollywood. He relocated to a three-story Victorian house on Haight Street in 1980. While the synthesizers were inexpensive compared to Moog, Buchla, and other manufacturers, Serge Tcherepnin's emphasis was always on providing musicians with quality equipment.

Although Serge synthesizers have been compared to Buchlas, their underlying philosophies and circuit designs are quite different. Serge modules were designed to bring many aspects of the circuits out to the front panel so modules can be patched in unusual and creative ways beyond the “normal" functions of that type of module. In contrast, Buchla modules were optimized to do one thing very well, using different signal levels and connector types to separate “sound and structure” (audio and control). The concept and philosophy of the Serge modular owes more to the Yale “Pulsa” system than to Buchla.

Serge synthesizers have been used by composers such as Michael Stearns and Kevin Braheny (who owned a 15-panel system dubbed The Mighty Serge). Serge synthesizers are known for their flexibility, audio quality and relative compactness. Other well-known musicians using Serge synthesizers include Malcolm Cecil, whose studio was used in Stevie Wonder albums; Gary Chang, movie composer; Richie Hawtin; Roger Powell, keyboard player for Todd Rundgren; John Adams, composer; Ingram Marshall, composer; Ivan Tcherepnin, composer; and many experimental and electronic musicians such as Jim O'Rourke, Thomas Ankersmit, Sarah Davachi, R. Luke DuBois, Keith Fullerton Whitman, and Paolo Tofani of the Italian free-jazz and experimental group Area. Cologne-based flutist Camilla Hoitenga, Estonian pianist Taavi Kerikmäe and Argentinian technician Francisco Colasanto employed a rare 1970s Serge modular synthesizer that once belonged to Karlheinz Stockhausen in their project Poles, an homage to Stockhausen centered around his composition Poles (1969-70).

Commercial builds and DIY kits of Serge synthesizers are currently available under license from a number of manufacturers.

== Overview ==
Originally, the module configuration for Serge systems could be selected by the user. 4U panels with module widths typically ranging from 1" to 3" (sometimes more in the case of sequencers), several modules could then be arranged on a 17-inch-wide panel (total of 16 inches of modules), resulting in a custom built panel. These were originally arranged by applying paper graphics to the metal panel (paper face), moving on to metal film graphics in the early 1980s and finally graphics printed directly onto the metal panel in the STS era.

Early systems mostly used standard paper graphic sheets (per module), but could have custom graphics—or no graphics—depending upon the whims of the artist. The top and bottom of the graphic sheets folded over onto the back of the panels and had wiring information printed on them. The whole panel would then be covered with a clear plastic film. Serge initially adopted a series of geometric designs denoting signal types, input, outputs, and triggers. Colored 4 mm sockets were used for most connections – blue, black, and red jacks; blue for (unipolar) control voltages, black for bipolar signals (NOT necessarily AC coupled) and red for pulse/gate signals, although these were not rigidly enforced. Later, other colors were introduced, e.g. yellow for triggers. By keeping output impedances low, Serge largely avoided the need for screened cables. 3.5 mm sockets were used for some audio interfacing to external equipment.

Serge modules did not separate audio signal and control voltage jacks, all signals were patched from module to module via banana patch cords. Banana cables offer quick patching with a secure connection, most banana plugs can be stacked, reducing the need for mults. The banana leads supplied by Serge and STS are 4 mm Pomona made heavy insulated in silicone cable. With a simple ground connection made between different units cross connection/modulation can be made between systems.

One of the first Serge Modular synthesizer created became the machine used on the first Greenpeace anti-whaling expedition (1975) by William (Will) Jackson, to approximate whale sounds and broadcast them to whales in the open Pacific. (A photo of this can be found in the Vancouver Sun newspaper archives May 1975.)

Business dropped off from the early 1980s, and in the early 1990s the business was transferred to Rex Probe who renamed it Sound Transform Systems (STS). STS didn’t offer kits and later ended user selectable module arrangements, concentrating on 17" pre-configured 'Shop' panels and then the half sized 'M-Class panel. These are smaller 8" panels, allowing a user more variety than the Shop Panels but less than custom. These panels come with a black 1" center panel for power distribution.

=== Modules ===
==== 1st generation modules (1973) ====
The first generation of modules consisted of:

- Dual voltage processor
- Dual audio mixer
- Peak and trough
- Triple bidirectional router
- Triple waveshaper
- Gate (VCA)
- Ring modulator
- Envelope generator (weird ASR)
- Oscillator (VCO with waveshaper)
- Dual negative slew
- Dual positive slew
- Triple comparator (plus Schmitt trigger)
- Voltage-controlled filter (2 pole state variable. LP, HP, BP)
- Send & Return (audio interface)
- Programmer (4-stage controller, linkable for 8 / 12 stages)
- Sequencer (10-step pulse only)
- Multiple

The Negative and Positive Slews, were able to function as envelope followers, crude low pass filters, modulating waveforms, subharmonic generators, and audio oscillators. The Programmer served as the performance interface, being a manually controllable sequencer. It could be patched to the (pulse) sequencer - in some early systems they were hard-wired together. These systems were essentially DIY.

==== 2nd generation modules (1974/75) ====
Serge set up SMMS in 1974 and set about extending and upgrading the range. Systems would contain first and second generations modules, and could be factory built or DIY. The second generation of modules included:

- Smooth and stepped function generator
- Noise generator (later incl. S&H)
- Phase shifter
- Preamp
- Reverb (spring)
- Analog shift register
- Keyboard Envelope generator (VC ADSR)

He also upgraded the mixer, dual processor, Send & Return, Oscillator etc. Some circuit boards could serve several roles, so for example the Smooth & Stepped board was also used in the Random Voltage Generator, the Dual VC Slope Generator, the Rate-Controlled S&H etc. There were probably other custom modules made during this period, but information is scarce.

As well as working on the modular range Serge worked with others. He designed and built custom modules for Malcolm Cecil and Robert Margouleff's TONTO system (as used on several Stevie Wonder albums), and worked with Frank Eventoff on his Sonica and Rainmaker instruments.

==== 3rd generation modules (1976) ====
Around 1976, Serge started to replace most of his first generation modules with a new range of state-of-the-art designs, featuring highly accurate 1V/Oct oscillators and high dynamic range VCAs (voltage-controlled amplifiers), a new filter technology with low-noise and mixers with equal power multi-channel panning. A new, simpler panel graphics style was also introduced, losing most of the geometric designs, just retaining a simple rectangle around the outputs.

In addition to fully featured standard synthesis modules such as voltage-controlled oscillators, filters, and envelope generators, the Serge system includes esoteric audio signal processors such as a Wave Multiplier, a multipurpose slew / envelope module and a very flexible touch-sensitive keyboard controller combined with a 16-stage analogue sequencer, known as the TKB. The new modules included:

- Quad VCA
- Universal Equal Power Stereo & Quad Audio Panner
- PCO (high quality VCO)
- NTO (PCO plus waveshaping, FM, etc.)
- Variable bandwidth VCF
- Variable slope VCF
- Variable Q VCF (also extended range VCF)
- Wave multipliers
- Dual universal slope generator / Dual transient generator
- Touch activated keyboard sequencer (TKB)
- Extended ADSR
- Pitch and envelope follower (Gentle Electric boards mounted on a Serge panel)

He also extended the range of mixers and CV processors. Many of the circuit boards could by used or combined in a variety of ways, and an exhaustive list of modules would be difficult to compile. The Quad VCAs and Equal Power Panners could be built into multi-channel voltage-controlled mixers. Filter banks were made in small numbers, but it is uncertain if any of the hex panners shown in the catalogue were ever built. All the filters were 2 pole state variable, 12 dB/octave. (Some sources have mistakenly stated that the VCFS is 18 or 24 dB/octave.)

While some earlier modules remained in production, the new modules replaced many of the older modules. These new third generation designs remain at the heart of Serge Modular systems to the present day.

==== 4th generation modules (1979) ====
Around 1979, a fourth generation of modules started to appear, complementing the 1976 modules and replacing some earlier modules. The current Serge panel graphics style also appeared around this time. The new modules included:

- Active processor
- Resonant equalizer
- 4//6/7/8 step sequencer
- Divide/n comparator, dual comparator, Schmitt trigger
- Wilson Analog Delay
- Balanced modulator
- Quantizer
- Frequency shifter
- Quadrature oscillator
- Dual VCA
- Envelope follower / preamp
- N voice controller

Also, new electronics were designed for the audio mixer/processor/scaling/buffering modules and the VCA/panners, and the "paper face" panel graphics were replaced with metallized plastic film. Throughout this period, systems were available built or as kits - boards supplied pre-built and tested but you wire the panels up yourself. In 1979, Serge offered a standard module configuration - the "System 79".

The N voice controller was a polyphonic control interface which worked with a modified Casio keyboard. It appeared around 1982, just before MIDI.

==== STS modules (early 1990s) ====
The 1980s were not good times for modular synthesizer manufacturers, and no further Serge modules appeared after 1983. In the early 1990s, Sound Transform Systems took over the range and added a few simple designs of their own to the range. These included:

- Pulse Divider
- Boolean Logic
- Audio Mixer (with Phase Switch)
- Balanced output module (on rear of panels)
- MIDI CV (short lived)

They later introduced new variations on existing modules such as the VC Timegen Osc/clock/dual VC clock, and were able to use better quality parts and quality control. Affordable component quality improved massively through the 1980s, especially good quality, low cost potentiometers.

STS gradually phased out custom panels in favor of standardized "Shop Panels". One and two panels systems were available.

- Animal - a 2 VCO complete voice panel
- Animate - voice/processing panel
- Blue Voice - 3 VCO audio panel
- Blue Control - Envelope & CV processing
- Red Fun Station - 2 VCO audio panel
- Red Control Panel -Envelope/CV/Quanstizer panel
- Sequencer Panel - Dual Sequencer plus clock and logic
- Soup Kitchen 1 - Processing panel with frequency shifter
- Soup Kitchen 2 - Processing panel with 1 VCO

Around 2010, STS introduces half-width M-Class panels. Two panels could be mounted either side of a 1" black power distribution strip in a Serge "boat" (box). These allowed greater customization than shop panels. Panels include:

- Creature
- Gator
- Sequencer
- Triple Oscillator
- Quad Slope
- Wave Processor
- Audio Interface
- Klangziet
- Mayhem

Etc.

==== Licensing (2010s) ====
By the late 1990s, Serge kits were no longer produced, and with schematics intentionally unavailable, "support" usually meant sending panels to STS - expensive and inconvenient for customers outside the USA. With prices high and only full panels available from STS, there was also interest in obtaining individual modules. A small group of enthusiasts researched schematics to support their own instruments, which led to small scale production of DIY Serge circuit boards for their own use, particularly for early discontinued models. Eventually Serge Tcherepnin was contacted and his interest in his synths was renewed.

From that beginning, Serge became actively involved, and Serge designs were licensed to kit and module manufacturers such as CGS, Random*Source, ELBY Designs, Loudest Warning, and 73-75. Some of these modules are also available in the Eurorack format. As of 2018, Serge himself is actively collaborating with Random*Source as Chief Innovation Officer and is developing new circuits.

==== General ====
Panels - Originally Serge panels had all standard hole positions punched, and the panel labels covered over unused holes. While this could look a bit scruffy, it was very versatile and allowed for upgrading or changing modules. Paper labels were replaced by metalised labels around 1981. When STS took over in the early 1990s, they printed graphics directly onto their panels, giving a more solid, professional look but sacrificing the ability to change module types in a panel. They also introduced a range of standard "shop panel" configurations. More recently, STS introduced smaller M modules, where two narrower pre-configured panels fit each side of a center power modules.

Power - There is very little information about early Serge power supplies, but Serge soon settled upon commercial Power One supplies set for +/-12v. Some first generation modules also required a +6v supply, initially provided by a 6v regulator on the supply but as these modules became fewer the regulators were mounted near the modules before dying out completely around 1980. The n-voice controller was unique in requiring a supply with an additional 5v supply for its computer board. At some point, Condor supplies were used instead - these were almost identical to Power One supplies. Early supplies used a 4-pin Cinch Jones type connector, but sometime in the mid/late 1970s these were superseded by 5-pin XLR connectors. Power distribution in Serge panels were never as good as it perhaps should have been, but gradual improvements were made – distribution modules being introduced in the mid 1970s and the STS black panel for m-modules in recent times.
