= Ensoniq ASR-10 =

Digital musical instrument

ASR-10
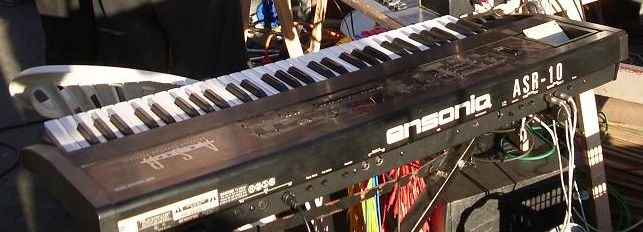
- Ensoniq ASR-10 (keyboard, rear)
- Manufacturer: Ensoniq
- Dates: 1992–1998
- Price: £1999

Technical specifications
- Polyphony: 31 voices
- Synthesis type: 16-bit samples, 29.7619 kHz or 44.1 kHz
- Aftertouch expression: Yes
- Velocity expression: Yes
- Storage memory: 2 MB, expandable to 16 MB
- Effects: 50 onboard effects

Input/output
- Keyboard: 61-note with polyphonic aftertouch
- External control: MIDI

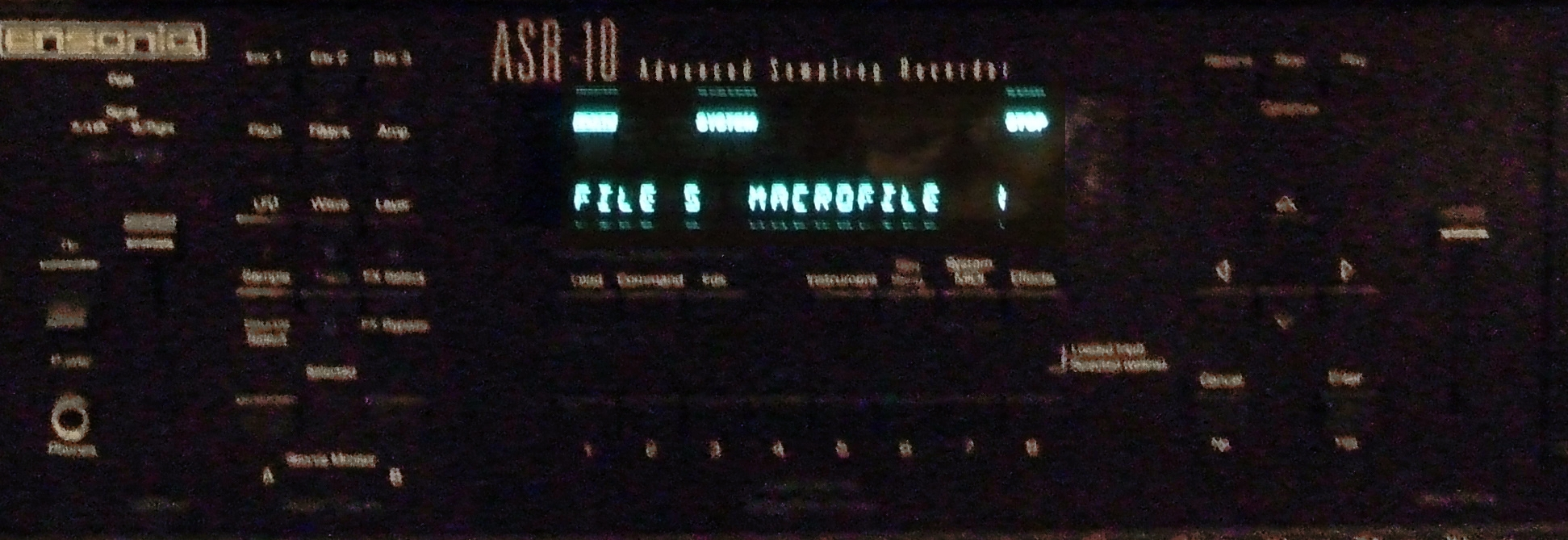
Ensoniq ASR-10R (rackmount version)

The Ensoniq ASR-10 is a sampling keyboard produced by Ensoniq between 1992 and 1998. The ASR-10 was a follow-up product to the very popular Ensoniq EPS and EPS-16 Plus performance samplers, and

was also available with a piano style weighted keyboard (ASR-88) and a rackmount version (ASR-10R). At the time, the machine was one of the most powerful samplers available.

== Features ==
The ASR-10 (Advanced Sampling Recorder) was essentially the third generation of the EPS series of samplers, sharing the same basic architecture and user interface as the earlier EPS Classic and EPS-16 Plus. The ASR-10, like its predecessors, was a true performance orientated sampling workstation, and did not require a computer or additional equipment in order to create a complete song. It included a powerful and flexible effects unit, polyphonic aftertouch, an advanced MIDI sequencer, load-while-playing abilities, and a powerful multi-layered synthesis engine. The supplied "Musician's Manual" lived up to Ensoniq's documentation practice, with a highly readable, very hands-on and quite complete description of the device. There was even an included tutorial that covered many features of the machine, including sampling and sequencing.

=== Effects unit ===
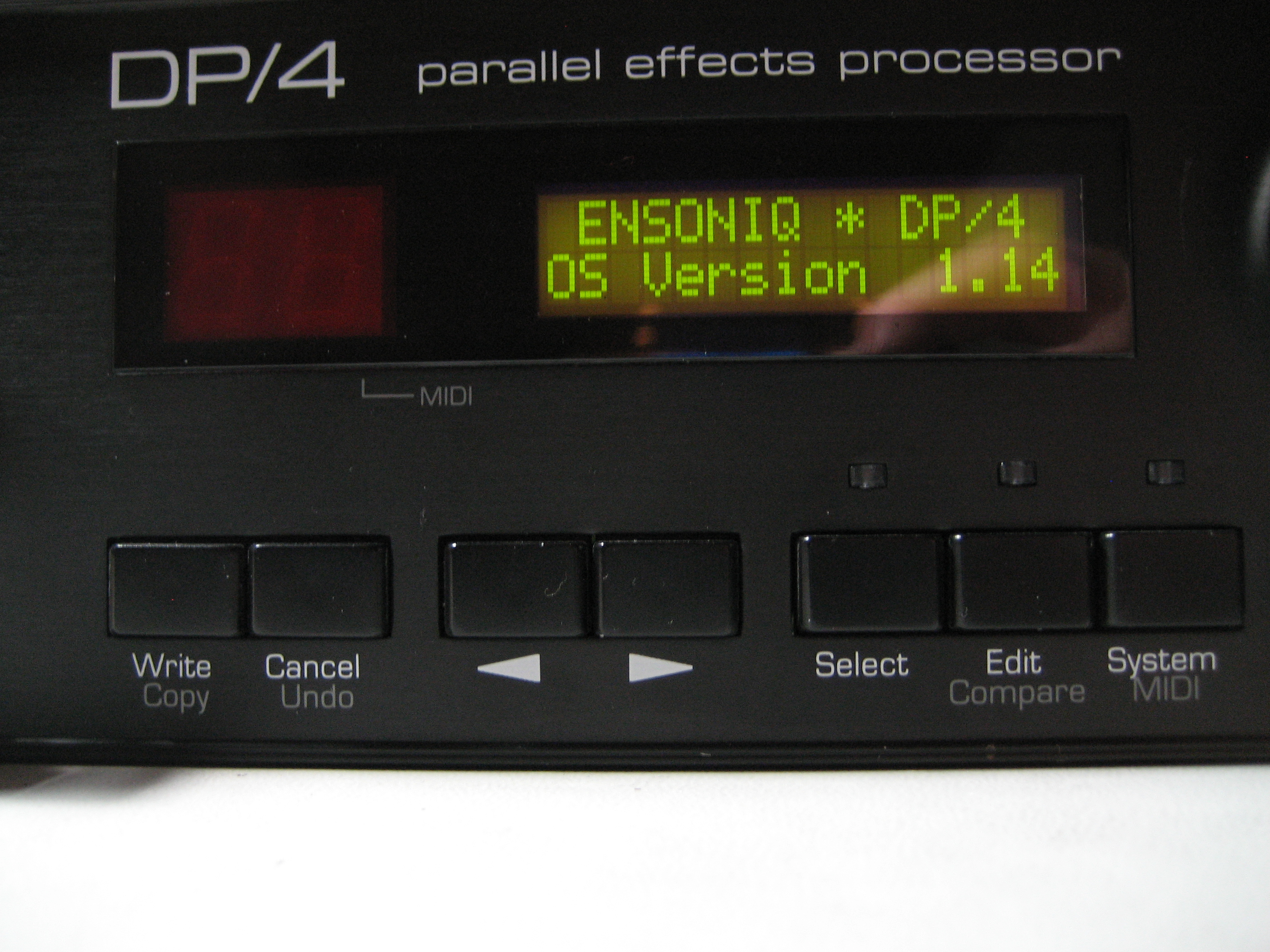
Ensoniq DP/4 Multi Effects Processor (display)

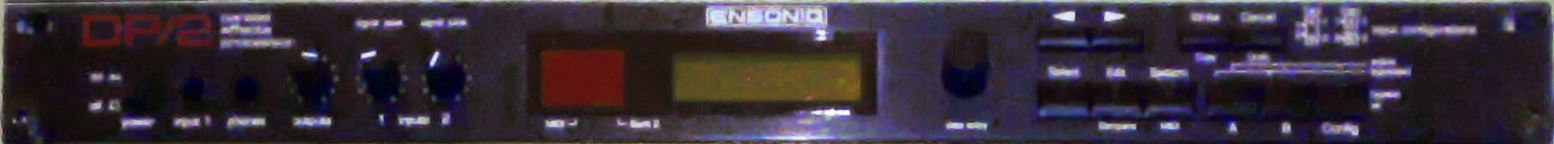
Ensoniq DP/2 (2in/2out version)

The ASR-10 offered a powerful and flexible internal effects unit (later offered as a standalone device in the Ensoniq DP/4), offering the capability to resample an existing sound with an effect, and to process external signals through it live. Up to 62 effects were available to be used, also including a vocoder and distortion. The effects were all programmable, and flexible configurations were available for operating in multitimbral or performance modes.

=== Sequencer ===
The ASR-10 sequencer had an internal 96 pulse-per-quarter-note 16 track sequencer. A 'song' was a collection of 'sequences' joined, and users were able to jump to sequences live during a performance, in much the same way as software such as Ableton Live allows today. Songs were constructed in either a step time (note by note basis) or through live recording of the MIDI information played in.

=== Synthesis architecture ===
The ASR-10 had a powerful 31 voice synthesis architecture that resembled a synthesizer rather than a sampler. After selecting a sample, the sound could further be modified by up to 3 envelopes (hardwired to pitch, filter, and amplitude), 2 filters in series, one LFO, and 15 modulation sources. Up to 8 layers of different samples could be stacked together to form an 'instrument', and up to 127 different samples available up at any one time. Each sample could be modulated by any number of modulation sources, including velocity, polyphonic aftertouch, LFOs, envelopes, footpedals, or combinations of the two patch-select buttons on the left hand side of the keyboard. These patch-select buttons (an Ensoniq trademark) allowed the player to instantly recall during performance any one of four pre-programmed combinations of the eight layers to be sounded.

=== Sampling ===
In its default format, the ASR-10 shipped with 2MB of internal memory, expandable to 16MB using SIMM memory sticks. The machine featured Sigma-Delta 64 times oversampling, and sampled at either 29.7619 kHz or 44.1 kHz rates at 16 bit.

The machine also has the ability to record directly to hard disk with only disk space limiting the file size. This allowed it to function as an early digital two track hard disk recorder. The recording could be made through the internal effect filter and could also record its own sequencer playing.

=== SCSI compatibility ===
Users purchasing SCSI devices for the ASR-10 should take care to verify compatibility; Ensoniq's SCSI implementation, while technically conformant, depends on the device supporting the low-level DISK FORMAT command, whereas many SCSI devices targeted at the IBM-PC market only supported the TRACK format commands, and such SCSI drives will not be usable by the ASR-10. The Syquest EZ-FLYER 230MB drive, for example, does work on the ASR-10, whereas the contemporary and more popular Iomega ZIP 100MB drives (save for some specially-flashed versions available by special request from the company during the 1990s) do not.

ASR-10s running the most recent OS version have no issues with Iomega Zip drives.

=== Disk drive ===
The ASR-10 featured a 3.5 inch floppy disk drive used with proprietary formatted disks capable of holding up to 1640K. (The decision to go with a proprietary format was to get around the then-limitation of DOS filenames which were limited to 8 characters.) There are many computer programs that allow reading, writing, and formatting Ensoniq's disk and file system, among those made by Chicken Systems (Translator and Disk Tools), and a German programmer named Thoralt who created ensoniqfs, a filesystem plugin for Total Commander. Ensoniq's architecture allowed a sound to be loaded from floppy while the keyboard was operational.

== Expansions, Accessories and Sound Libraries ==
=== Ensoniq SP-3 ===
This expansion board adds a SCSI interface to the Ensoniq ASR-10. These would usually come installed on the ASR-10R and always came installed on the ASR-88 model. This interface would allow the user to connect the machine to a SCSI CD-Rom drive or a SCSI Hard Drive, either external or internal. This would allow you to save your samples on a hard drive and load them with way faster times than the standard 3.5 inch floppy disks, and, of course, more storage than the floppy disks.

=== Ensoniq DI-10 ===
This expansion board would add digital audio S/PDIF I/O interface to the Ensoniq ASR-10, allowing you to sample with the highest audio quality and sample rate available. In recent years, these boards have come to be highly expensive and rare due to a low interest to use the S/PDIF on units, as well as their rarity, as few boards were ever produced.

=== Ensoniq OEX-6sr ===
This expansion would add 6 more audio outputs to the Ensoniq ASR-10. This expansion was previously released to the Ensoniq EPS-16 Plus under the name OEX-6. They are both relatively the same, due to using the same circuit board and connector, so this means that you can use the OEX-6 or OEX-6sr on the ASR-10 or EPS-16 Plus, since they are the same. These expansions would often come installed as a board on the ASR-10R.

=== Ensoniq ESS, ED, SL, SLT and AS libraries ===
These are sound libraries made by Ensoniq that were compatible with the ASR series. These would come on standard 3.5 inch floppy disks. Most of these were released for the Ensoniq EPS Classic and EPS-16 Plus.

The ASR series is compatible with all EPS Classic and EPS-16 Plus sound libraries, meaning you could load instruments, sequences and effects from the EPS Classic and EPS-16 Plus to the ASR series.

=== Ensoniq CDR and SCD sound libraries ===
These are sound libraries made by Ensoniq that were compatible with the ASR series. These came on CD-Roms, meaning in order for the user to utilize them, they would need their unit to have a SCSI interface and an external CD-Rom Drive. The CDR series are composed of 16 libraries with each one having one CD-Rom, and some of them are only compatible for the ASR series due to the size of some instruments, for example, the CDR-03 has a 13MB piano instrument, you can not load this on an EPS Classic or even EPS-16 Plus. The SCD. or Signature CD, series were composed of 4 libraries, with the SCD-03 having two CD-Roms instead of one.

== Notable users ==
The following producers and artists have been known to use the Ensoniq ASR-10 in their music:

- 88-Keys
- Aesop Rock
- The Alchemist
- Alan Braxe
- Annie Gosfield
- Ant
- Apathy
- Autechre
- Beck
- Blockhead
- Blur
- Clinton Sparks
- Crystal Method
- Daft Punk
- D'Angelo
- Decoded Feedback
- DJ Babu
- Michael Jackson
- DJ Qbert
- DJ Toomp
- Eligh
- El-P
- Evidence
- Havoc (musician)
- Hieroglyphics (group)
- Holger Czukay
- Illmind
- J Dilla
- Jake One
- Jan Jelinek
- Jan Linton (dr jan guru)
- John Ottman
- Kanye West
- Large Professor
- The Legendary Pink Dots
- Matt Uelmen
- Necro
- The Neptunes
- No ID
- Nottz
- Paul Meany and Darren King of Mutemath
- Prince Paul
- Pulp
- Rammstein
- Robert Rich
- Robin Beanland
- RZA
- Stoupe the Enemy of Mankind
- Takahito Eguchi
- Timbaland
