= Bob Ostertag =

American musician, political activist, and writer (born 1957)

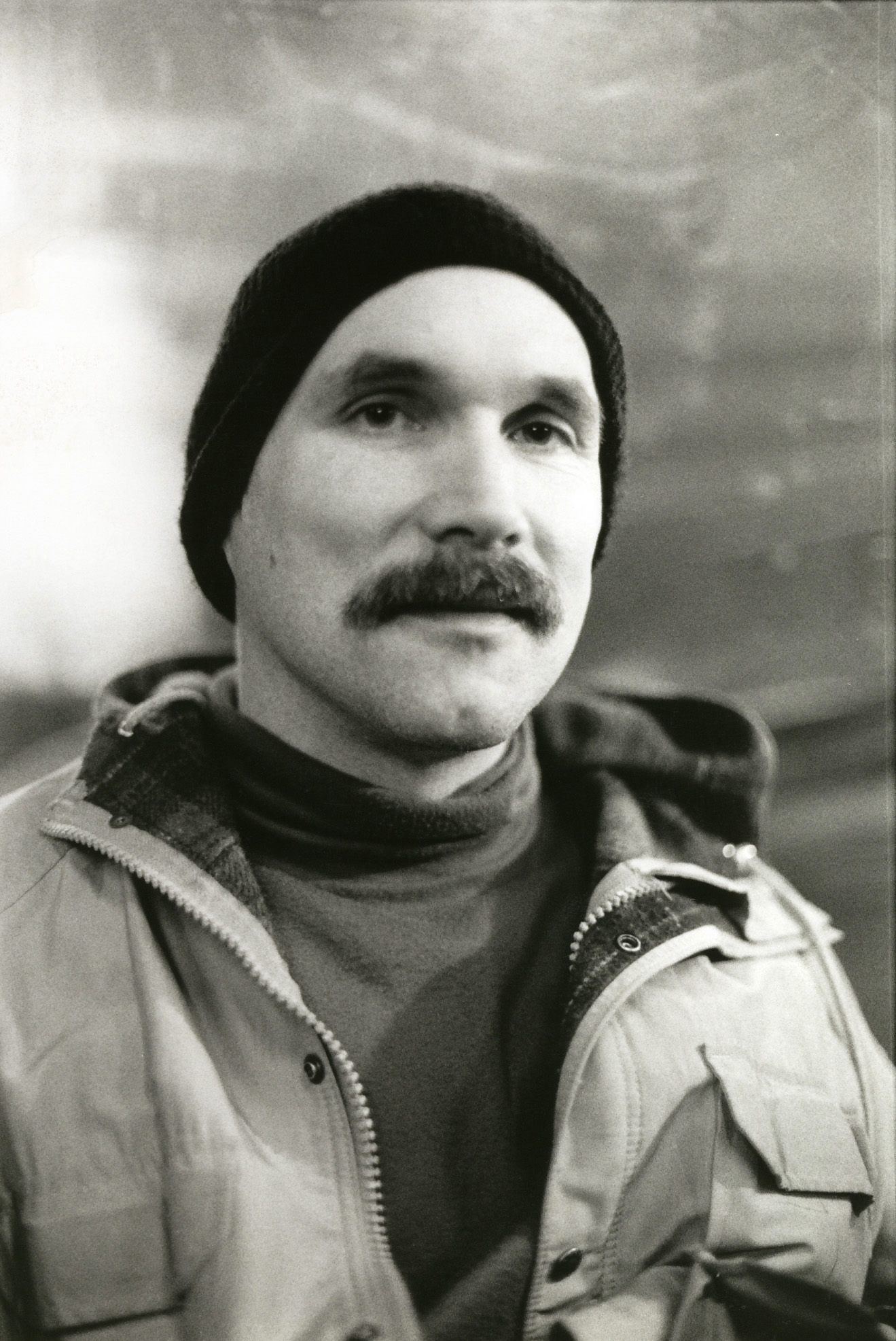
- Ostertag in 2003

Background information
- Born: Robert Ostertag; April 19, 1957 (age 69); Albuquerque, New Mexico, U.S.
- Genres: Avant-garde; experimental
- Occupations: Musician; performance artist; professor
- Years active: 1976–present
- Website: bobostertag.com

Robert "Bob" Ostertag (born April 19, 1957) is an American musician, writer, and political activist based in San Francisco. He has published seven books, one feature film, a DVD, twenty-six albums, and collaborated with numerous musicians.

Musically, he is known for his politically charged compositions created from found sound (Sooner or Later, All the Rage), his work with synthesizers over 45 years (from Bob Ostertag Plays the Serge 1978-1983 to Wish You Were Here in 2016), and his many collaborations (Anthony Braxton, John Zorn, Fred Frith, Justin Vivian Bond, Shelley Hirsch, and Roscoe Mitchell to name just a few).

In his writing, films, and podcasts, he has addressed LGBTQ issues, poverty, climate change, and technology.

On March 25, 2006, Ostertag made all of his recordings to which he owns the rights available as digital downloads under a Creative Commons Attribution-NonCommercial 2.5 license.

== Early career ==
Born in Albuquerque, New Mexico, and raised in Colorado, Ostertag studied at the Oberlin Conservatory of Music. At Oberlin, he worked with an early Buchla 200 synthesizer. Thirty-six years later, Ostertag's student work with the Buchla was remixed by techno DJ RRose and released under the title The Surgeon General. While at Oberlin he built a Serge synthesizer and began doing improvisational performances with it, along with Ned Rothenberg on reeds and Jim Katzin on violin. In 1979 this work was released by Parachute Records under the title Early Fall.

In 1978 he dropped out of Oberlin to tour Europe with Anthony Braxton's Creative Music Orchestra, which had just won the 1977 DownBeat Critics' Poll Album of the Year. Ostertag's work playing the Serge synthesizer with Braxton is documented on Creative Orchestra (Köln) 1978.

Later that same year, Ostertag relocated to New York City, where he befriended John Zorn, Fred Frith, Zeena Parkins, Ikue Mori, Wayne Horvitz, Toshinori Kondo, and numerous other musicians interested in collaborative improvisation. Ostertag was not the first musician to perform live with a keyboard-less modular synthesizer, but he was the first person to make it his main instrument in the context of free improvised music.

In 1980, Ostertag released Getting a Head with guitarist Fred Frith and percussionist Charles K. Noyes. Here Ostertag played an "instrument" of his own creation involved three reel-to-reel tape recorders, an audio mixer, and six helium balloons. The instrument was a sort of analog sculptural sampler, which allowed live manipulation of sound recorded on the fly that no conventional sampler was capable of at the time.

Following the release of Getting a Head, Ostertag became the first of his generation of musicians to have his work presented at The Kitchen, at the time New York City's premiere venue for new music.

At the same time, Ostertag was experimenting with improvising using the looped cassette tapes used in the telephone answering machines of the day, played in a collection of cheap portable cassette recorders, each one modified to malfunction in a different way. This led to the 1981 release of Voice of America, recorded at concerts in New York and London, with Fred Frith and vocalist Phil Minton. Ostertag's use of politically charged news snippets presaged the common use of such material later in the decade in hip hop

== Central America ==
With his sudden success came a greater involvement in politics, specifically in the turbulent revolutions and counter-revolutions of Central America in the 1980s. As Ostertag became increasingly involved in such political issues, and increasingly dissatisfied with the music industry, he threw himself into the effort to overthrow the military dictatorship in El Salvador, and for nearly ten years abandoned music altogether.

Ostertag eventually became an expert on the political crisis in Central America and published widely for a diverse range of publications, including Pensamiento Propio (Nicaragua), Pensamiento Critico (Puerto Rico), The Guardian (London), the Weekly Mail (South Africa), Mother Jones and the NACLA Report on the Americas (US), AMPO (Japan), and even the clandestine theoretical journal of the New People's Army in the Philippines. He alternated his time in Central America with organizing and public speaking in the US, giving lectures at Harvard, Yale, Princeton, Rutgers, and many other schools and institutions.

His reporting on the bombing of rebel-held areas in El Salvador won a “Most Censored Story of the Year” award from Project Censored.

Oliver Stone’s Salvador (1986) features James Woods in the lead role as the Pacific News Service correspondent in El Salvador, the position Ostertag held.

Some of his writings from Central America are included in his 2009 book of collected essays, Creative Life: Music, Politics, People, and Machines.

== Return to music ==
Ostertag returned to music in 1988 when Frith persuaded him to join Frith's review band, Keep the Dog. He also appeared in Nicolas Humbert and Werner Penzel's 1990 documentary film on Frith, Step Across the Border. Ostertag released Attention Span in 1990, featuring Frith on guitars and John Zorn on saxophone.

His experiences in El Salvador led to his composition Sooner or Later, a musique concréte tour de force made from a recording of a young boy burying his father in El Salvador. The German newspaper Die Zeit said, "Bob Ostertag did not simply create a political piece but a musical reality, in which sampling technology is used in a significant way for the first time. The music encircles reality, decomposes it into music and recomposes it until reality is no longer able to escape. It is this clarity that makes Sooner or Later great music, a music that has something to do with life again."

In 1992, The Kronos Quartet commissioned a new work from Ostertag. This commission produced the landmark work All the Rage. Ostertag composed the piece using a recording of the AB101 Veto Riot in San Francisco. Ostertag originally conceived the composition as a collaboration with writer/painter/photographer/film maker David Wojnarowicz, but David was ill with AIDS. When David died before the collaboration could take place, Ostertag made a second, solo piece from the riot recordings, Burns Like Fire, and dedicated it to Wojnarowicz. The cover art was a Wojnarowicz painting.

The Kronos Quartet presented the world premiere of All the Rage at Lincoln Center in 1993. New York Times critic Bernard Holland wrote: "Bob Ostertag’s All the Rage turned the evening on its head with a devastating roar of gay anger. Of recent concert pieces having to do with AIDS, All the Rage seems by far the most powerful example. Mr. Ostertag’s stern, purifying gaze has swept away the sentimentality and melodrama that have compromised more famous compositions in the genre."

In 1993 The Kronos Quartet released All the Rage as a CD under the same title. Once again, the cover art was a Wojnarowicz painting.

Ostertag went on to compose Spiral, setting to music the last writing of David Wojnarowicz. In the text, Wojnarowicz describes experiencing his own dying as turning into glass. Ostertag composed the work for a chamber ensemble of glass instruments he commissioned from Oliver DiCicco. Many of the instruments were destroyed in transit after a performance in Switzerland, so Spiral was never recorded.

In 1993, Ostertag formed a quartet with vocalist Phil Minton, bassist Mark Dresser, percussionist Gerry Hemingway. The music was composed using a novel method: Minton, Dresser, and Hemingway recorded separate improvisations with no instruction from Ostertag; using the earliest digital audio workstation software, Ostertag blew up the recordings into fragments which he stitched back together as ensemble compositions, which was released as Say No More in 1993, again using art by Wojnarowicz on the cover. Ostertag then gathered the musicians and, using the computer recording as a "score," rehearsed and toured the music, eventually recording a live performance which was released in 1994 by ORF Radio as Say No More In Person. Ostertag then took that recording, blew it up, and put the pieces back together in a new composition released in 1996 as Verbatim, a live performance recording of which was released in 2000 as Verbatim Flesh & Blood. The All Music Guide states, "With Say No More, Ostertag elevated the sampler to the rank of musical instrument and gained recognition as a true visionary that cannot be ignored. The border between free improvisation and musique concrete will never be the same. Any serious fan of avant-garde music needs to hear this, one of the rare avant-garde albums where the relevance of the artistic argument equals the relevance of the result."

In 2012 Ostertag developed this method of composing with fragments of recorded improvisations further with A Book of Hours. Commissioned by WDR 3 open: studio akustische kunst in Köln, the work was a collaboration with Theo Bleckmann, Shelley Hirsch, and Phil Minton (voice), and Roscoe Mitchell (reeds). The British music magazine The Wire said A Book of Hours delivered “the sophisticated and earnest best of what experimental music always offers but rarely delivers. 50 minutes of thought, weirdness, and formal precision.”

Of all Ostertag's project, perhaps the most unlikely was PantyChrist, a completely improvised trio featuring Tokyo-based DJ and guitarist Otomo Yoshihide and transgender cabaret icon Justin Vivian Bond.

At the end of the 1990s, Ostertag combined his music and multi-media work with his international journalism in the creation of Yugoslavia Suite, his reaction to the civil wars that broke up former Yugoslavia. His journal of his harrowing concert tour of Yugoslavia Suite in ex-Yugoslavia shortly after the fighting ended was published first as a cover story of The Wire, and then included in his book Creative Life: Music, Politics, People, and Machines.

In 2000, Ostertag began a twelve-year collaboration called Living Cinema with Quebecois film maker Pierre Hébert. Using a beta version of the programming which was eventually released as Max/MSP/Jitter. Ostertag and Hebert created a novel method to combine painting and drawing, stop-motion animation, and real-time digital video processing into a live performance during which an animated "film" was projected as it was created. Similar techniques are now used by a number of video artists and VJs. Living Cinema toured extensively for many years in North and South America, Europe and Asia. A Living Cinema DVD was released on John Zorn' Tzadik label in 2004.

Ostertag has maintained an interest in electronic instruments throughout his career, leading to a close lifelong friendship with synthesizer pioneer Don Buchla, who was designing a new instrument for Ostertag when he died in 2016. In addition to Buchla and Serge synthesizers, Ostertag has worked extensively with the Ensoniq ASR-10 sampler and the virtual synthesizer Aalto. He has also created numerous software instruments of his own using Max/MSP. The many recordings which highlight these instruments include Bob Ostertag Plays the Serge 1978-1983, Motormouth: Bob Ostertag plays the Buchla 200e, Bob Ostertag Plays the Aalto, Like a Melody, No Bitterness (using the Ensoniq ASR-10). and DJ of the Month](using Ostertag's own software instrument), and many more.

In 2011, Ostertag released a collaborative EP released on underground techno label Sandwell District with artist Rrose. Her interpretation of Ostertag's work was well received by critics, which led to another collaborative EP, released during the summer of 2012, entitled "The Surgeon General."

== Writing ==
Ostertag's first book was the anonymously published The Yes Men: The True Story of the End of the World Trade Organization (2004).

In 2006 he published a history of radical journalism in the US, People's Movements, People's Press: The Journalism of Social Justice Movements.

In 2009 he published a semi-autobiographical collection of essays on music, politics, and technology, Creative Life: Music, Politics, People, and Machines.

In 2012 he co-authored Raising Expectations (And Raising Hell), My Decade Fighting for the Labor Movement. with Jane McAlevey. The book was named "the most valuable book of 2012" by The Nation magazine.

In 2016, he published Sex Science Self: A Social History of Estrogen, Testosterone, and Identity.

In 2020, at the peak of the Covid pandemic, he published A Home Yoga Companion: How to Safely Develop Your Own Yoga Practice While Stuck at Home During a Global Pandemic. The book was published as a free e-book by PM Press.

In February 2021, his new book "Facebooking the Anthropocene in Raja Ampat: Technics and Civilization in the 21st Century" was released.

For many years he wrote a blog on The Huffington Post.

== Feature film ==
In 2019, Bob Ostertag premiered his documentary, Thanks to Hank about the life of artist and activist Hank Wilson. It features music by the Kronos Quartet, Carla Kihlstedt, and The Tin Hat Trio, and animation by Jeremy Rourk].

== Podcasts ==
Ostertag runs two podcasts. What's Been Done and What's Been Won covers poverty in the US and Detroit in particular, the home of his podcast collaborator Maureen Taylor, who is state chair of the Michigan Welfare Rights Organization.You Make Me Real: Queer Lives of the San Francisco Bay, features oral histories of longtime Bay Area LGBTQ residents.

== Teaching ==
Ostertag is professor emeritus of technocultural studies at UC Davis.

== Discography ==
=== Solo improvisations ===
- Like a Melody, No Bitterness: Bob Ostertag Solo Volume 1 (1997)
- DJ of the Month: Bob Ostertag Solo Volume 2 (2003)

=== Compositions ===
- Sooner or Later (1991)
- Burns Like Fire (companion piece to All the Rage) (1992)
- All the Rage (1993)
- Dear Prime Minister (1998)
- Say No More 1 & 2 (2002)
- Say No More 3 & 4 (2002)
- w00t (2007)
- Motormouth (2011)
- Bob Ostertag Plays the Aalto (2013)
- Wish You Were Here (2016)

=== Bands ===
- Fear No Love (with Mike Patton, Fred Frith, Justin Bond, Lynn Breedlove, et al.) (1995)
- PantyChrist (with Otomo Yoshihide and Justin Bond) (1999)

=== Collaborations ===
- Fall Mountain: Early Fall (with Ned Rothenberg and Jim Katzin) (1979)
- Getting a Head (with Charles Noyes and Fred Frith) (1980)
- Voice of America (with Fred Frith and Phil Minton) (1982)
- Attention Span (with John Zorn and Fred Frith) (1990)
- Twins! (with Otomo Yoshihide) (1996)

=== DVD / Video ===
- Living Cinema presents Between Science and Garbage (with Pierre Hébert) (2002)

=== Appearances on compilations ===
- AngelicA 1994 (with John Zorn and Fred Frith) (1994)
- AngelicA 1997 (with Mike Patton and Otomo Yoshihide) (1997)

=== Performing the works of other composers ===
With Anthony Braxton

- Creative Orchestra (Köln) 1978 (hatART, 1978 [1995])

With Eugene Chadbourne

- The English Channel (Parachute, 1978)

With Fred Frith

- Keep the Dog: That House We Lived In (2003)

With Christian Wolff

- Burdocks (Tzadik, 2001)

With John Zorn

- Pool (Parachute, 1980 – reissued Tzadik, 2003)
- The Parachute Years (Tzadik, 1997)

== Books ==
- Facebooking the Anthropocene in Raja Ampat: Technics and Civilization in the 21st Century, by Bob Ostertag, PM Press, 2021, ISBN 978-1-629-63830-0.
- A Home Yoga Companion: How to Safely Develop Your Own Yoga Practice While Stuck at Home During a Global Pandemic, by Bob Ostertag, PM Press, 2020.
- Sex Science Self: A Social History of Estrogen, Testosterone, and Identity, by Bob Ostertag, University of Massachusetts Press, 2016. ISBN 978-1625342133
- Raising Expectations (and Raising Hell): My Decade Fighting for the Labor Movement, by Jane McAlevey and Bob Ostertag, Verso Press, 2012. ISBN 978-1844678853
- Creative Life: Music, Politics, People, and Machines, by Bob Ostertag, University of Illinois Press, 2009, ISBN 978-0-252-03451-0.
- People's Movements, People's Press: The Journalism of Social Justice Movements, by Bob Ostertag, Beacon Press, 2006, ISBN 978-0-8070-6166-4.
- The Yes Men: The True Story of the End of the World Trade Organization, published anonymously as The Yes Men, Disinformation Press, 2004. ISBN 978-0972952996
