= Seeland Records =

Record company named for Sealand

- Parent company: Revolver USA
- Founded: 1979
- Founder: Mark Hosler, Richard Lyons, Ian Allen, David Wills
- Genre: Experimental
- Country of origin: U.S.
- Official website: www.negativland.com

Seeland Records is an independent record label created by Negativland in 1979 to release their own recordings. It is a reference to the song "Seeland" by the band Neu!, who also gave Negativland the basis for their name, Sea-Land Corporation, a freight company, (the label's logo is a parody of the company's logo) and the micro-nation of Sealand, which in early history was home to radio pirates.

== History ==
Seeland largely disappeared when Negativland signed with SST Records for a time during the late 1980s and early 1990s. But after an acrimonious split with that label, Negativland revived Seeland and began releasing new recordings, not just by themselves but also by other artists (the Evolution Control Committee and John Oswald to name two) who usually shared their philosophies regarding fair use. The label was distributed by Lumberjack Mordam Distribution until 2009, when Mordam shut down. Subsequently, the band relaunched the label in 2010 with distribution from Revolver USA.

== Roster ==
- Antediluvian Rocking Horse
- Bob Ostertag
- Eddie The Rat
- Head & Leg
- Jane Timberlake
- John Oswald
- GitAr (I Cut People, Ellipse Elkshow)
- Mono Pause/Aavikko
- Negativland
- PantyChrist (Bob Ostertag, Justin Bond, and Otomo Yoshihide)
- Porest
- Realistic
- Silica-Gel
- Sleepytime Gorilla Museum
- The Evolution Control Committee
- The Rudy Schwartz Project
- Tiny Tim
- TISM
- Twink
- Xerophonics

== See also ==
- List of record labels
