= CCMC (band) =

Canadian free improvisation group

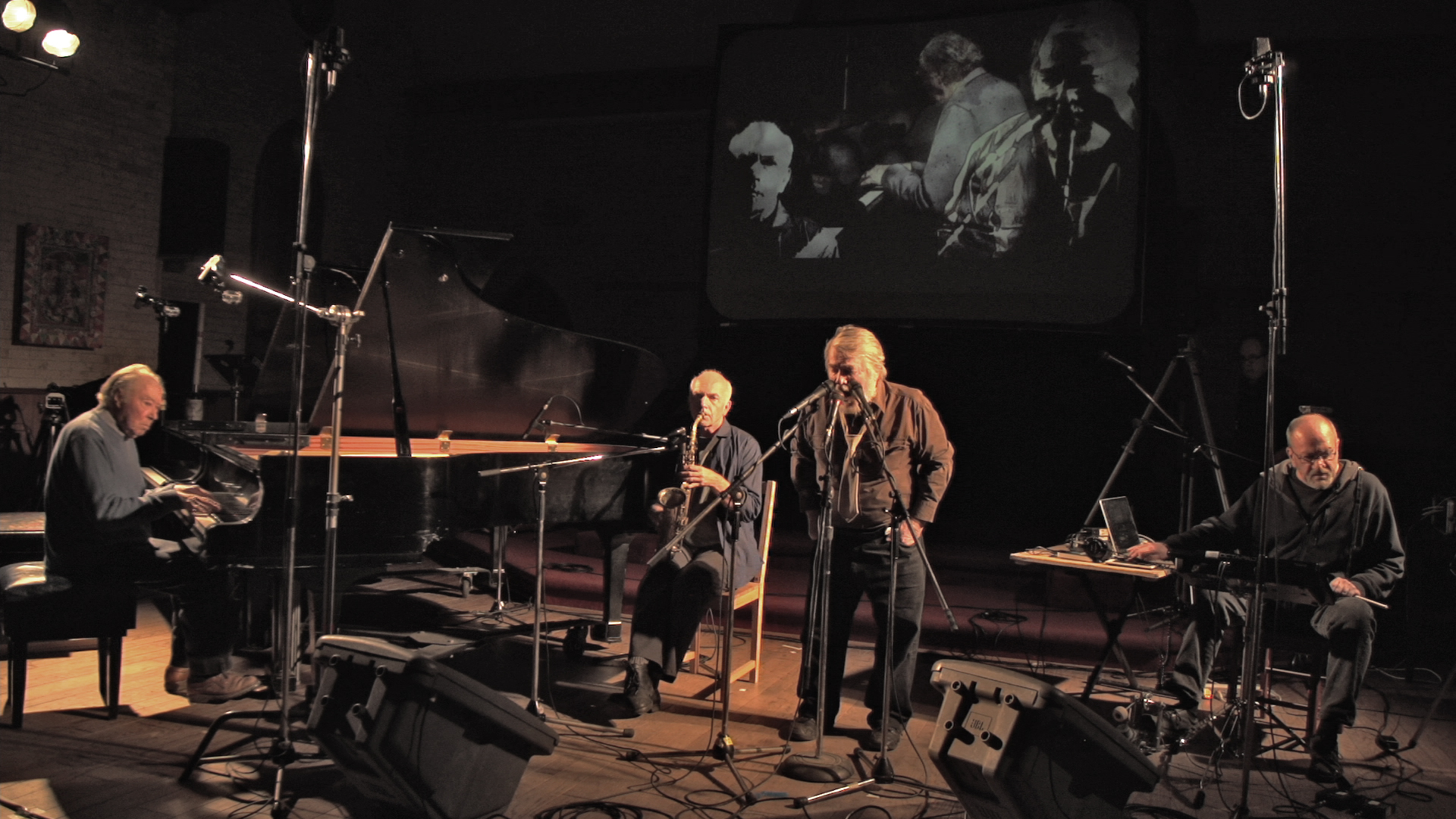
- CCMC at The Music Gallery, Toronto, Ontario. 2015.

Background information
- Origin: Toronto, Canada
- Genres: free improvisation, avant-garde, avant-garde jazz, electroacoustic music
- Years active: 1974–
- Labels: Music Gallery Editions, Track & Light, Les Disques Victo, Art Metropole, Free Market
- Spinoff of: Artists' Jazz Band
- Members: John Kamevaar, John Oswald
- Past members: Graham Coughtry; Nobuo Kubota; Greg Gallagher; Bill Smith; Peter Anson; Casey Sokol; Al Mattes; Larry Dubin; Michael Snow; Jack Vorvis; Paul Dutton

CCMC is a Canadian free improvisation group founded in 1974.

== History ==
The CCMC was founded by Peter Anson, Graham Coughtry, Larry Dubin, Greg Gallagher, Nobuo Kubota, Allan Mattes, Casey Sokol, Bill Smith and Michael Snow. Three of the founding members (Graham Coughtry, Nobuo Kubota, and Michael Snow) were members of Artists' Jazz Band, a seminal Toronto free-jazz ensemble. In 1976, the group founded The Music Gallery as an artist-run centre where they performed twice-weekly. The group was formally associated with The Music Gallery until 2000. Members of the group were also founders of the Music Gallery Editions record label, which issued CCMC's first six albums.

The group remains active to the present day, though through its various incarnations Michael Snow has been the group's only constant member. The group performed as a quartet of Snow (piano/Octave Cat synthesizer), John Oswald (alto sax), Paul Dutton (soundsinging, mouth harp) and John Kamevaar (electronic percussion/electroacoustic sounds).

== Musical style ==
CCMC's music is based on "improvisation-as-composition" (p. 40) inspired by free jazz.

We came to it because... we wanted to create not only a new work or a new instrument, but a new composer, a six-brained, twelve-handed individual, to see what it would come up with.

— liner notes to Volume 3, cited by Harry Freedman, Freedman 1978 p3

With no pre-existing compositions, live performance is central to the band's identity, and their early recordings were all recorded live in concert. ("Interviewer: Since the very beginning CCMC has recorded every concert, is that true? Michael Snow: Yes, that's, whatever it is, thirteen years of at least twice a week, plus all the tours. A lot of tape, yes."

From 1974 until the early 1980s CCMC played at least two concerts a week, most of which took place in their own venue, The Music Gallery, in Toronto. The band was and continues to be a "free music orchestra" devoted to spontaneous composition. One look at the cover of the Vol 1 LP and it's apparent that CCMC are not your typical hippy free-rock group, slick-suited jazz cats, nor tweed academic weekend composers. In fact, CCMC never really look like typical musicians at all, but rather like visual artists, family men, scholars, Canucks, ecologists, sculptors and radical adults they are. Similarly, their sound can never really be pinned down in the way that other devotees of "free" music usually are; never as dogmatic as AMM, as angry as American free jazz, as bleak as Japanese free jazz or as humorless as European free improv. CCMC are as comfortable playing toys and melodies as they were noise electronics and torrential freak-outs. In the truest sense CCMC were sonic explorers devoted to spontaneous free music, uninhibited by any restriction, be it melody, silence, genre, volume or instrumentation.

— notes to Polyphasic Recordings' CCMC reissue project

== Name ==
The abbreviation CCMC originally stood for Canadian Creative Music Collective. By 1978, and the release of the Volume Three LP, the group had collectively gathered several hundred alternate associations, many of which were reproduced as the cover art of that record. Following are a selection of the names found there:

- Craven Cowards Muttering Curses
- Cries Crashes Murmurs Clanks
- Careless Choir Muffling Chords
- Completely Canadian Monster Circus
- Certified Careless Mush Concept
- Clip Clop Manure Crop
- Catchy Canuck Melody Convinces

== Discography ==
- Volume 1 (Music Gallery Editions – CCMC-1002, 1976)
- Volume 2 (Music Gallery Editions – CCMC-1004, MGE-2, 1976)
- Volume Three (Music Gallery Editions – MGE 6, 1978)
- Volume 4 - Free Soap (Music Gallery Editions – MGE 22, 1979)
- Larry Dubin & CCMC The Great Toronto Drummer's Greatest Recordings (Music Gallery Editions – MGE 15, 1979)
- Volume 5 - Without A Song (Music Gallery Editions – MGE 31, 1981)
- CCMC '90 (Music Gallery Editions – MGE 90, 1990)
- Decisive Moments: Hot Real-Time Electro-Acoustic Collective Composition (Track & Light Recordings – TLR 02, 1994)
- aCCoMpliCes (Les Disques Victo – VICTO cd063, 1998)
- CCMC & Christian Marclay CCMC + Christian Marclay (Art Metropole/Non Musica Rex – ART MET CD004/NMRX 0003, 2002)
- CCMC Play At Double Double (Free Market Records, FMR07, 2011)

== Further resources ==
- "CCMC". Polyphasic Recordings
- Freedman, Harry (1978). "CCMC VOL. III" in Musicworks, No. 1.
- Discogs listing
- See the Music Gallery archival collection. York University. "The fonds consists of two series, the CCMC concert series (1973-199-?) of twice-weekly public performances by members who have included Peter Anson, Paul Dutton, John Kamevaar, Nobuo Kubotu, Allen Mattes, John Oswald, Michael Snow, Casey Sokol, Jack Vorvis."
