= Matthew Bourne (musician) =

British jazz musician

- Born: 6 October 1977 (age 48); Avebury, England
- Genres: Avant-garde, jazz
- Occupations: Bandleader, composer, educator
- Instruments: Piano, keyboard, cello
- Years active: 2001 - present
- Website: matthewbourne.com

Matthew Bourne (born 6 October 1977) is an English multi-instrumentalist, primarily working with piano and keyboards.

== Childhood and education ==
Bourne was born in Avebury, England, and grew up in a small village situated in the Cotswolds, where he took up the trombone aged nine. In 1989, Bourne attended Kingham Hill School and began playing cello the following year. After seeing Frank Sinatra play on television in 1993, Bourne began to teach himself the piano.

Bourne enrolled at Leeds College of Music in 1995 where he began to explore contemporary classical composition and avant-garde. During his time at the college, he performed Michael Daugherty's piano concerto "Tombeau de Liberace" and John Cage's "Concerto for Prepared Piano and Orchestra". In 2001, Bourne graduated from the MMus jazz studies course. Bourne has subsequently taught as a part-time lecturer at Leeds College of Music and has a PhD in performance from the University of Leeds.

== Career ==
Bourne's success began in 2001 when he was named the Perrier Young Jazz Musician of the Year. His success continued the following year when he was awarded the prize for Jazz Innovation at the BBC Radio Jazz Awards. In this period, Bourne was profiled in The Observer Music Monthly as "the future sound of jazz". In 2005, he won the International Jazz Festivals Organisation International Jazz Award. His first solo album, The Molde Concert, was recorded live at the Molde International Jazz Festival and received positive reviews. This performance showcased Bourne's inventive use of samples (including audio clips from The Simpsons and other TV shows) as well as his "cyclonic energy and virtuosity" and "ramblingly self-deprecating and sometimes off-mic announcements".

By this stage, Bourne had also become co-leader of The Electric Dr M, Distortion Trio and Bourne/Davis/Kane, and was beginning to work in a wider context, leading to notable collaborations with artists and groups such as Nostalgia 77, Marc Ribot, Paul Dunmall, Annette Peacock, John Zorn, Pete Wareham, Barre Phillips and Tony Bevan.

Bourne has been commissioned to write works for Bath International Music Festival, London Jazz Festival, Leeds Fuse Festival as well as from the pianist Joanna MacGregor and Faber Music. Bourne's work has been broadcast on various BBC radio and television programmes.

In 2012, Bourne released Montauk Variations on The Leaf Label. The album began a long and fruitful relationship with the label and was awarded the Leftfield Album of the Year award by the Sunday Times. Its "lyrical and romantic" mood marked a change in musical direction from the avant-garde tone of his earlier work. Montauk Variations caught the attention of Amon Tobin and Nancy Elizabeth, both of whom invited Bourne to rework their material, and Simon Green of Bonobo selected the composition "Juliet" for inclusion in his release of the Late Night Tales compilation series.

In 2015, Bourne embarked on a UK tour with an audio/visual project entitled Radioland. This was a collaboration with Antoine Schmitt and Franck Vigroux to celebrate the 40th anniversary of the release of Radio-Activity by Kraftwerk. The Anglo-French trio "take the album’s melodies and textures as the starting point for avant-garde explorations" that saw Bourne performing on a variety of analogue synthesisers as well as singing in German through a vocoder. An album of this music, entitled Radioland: Radio-Activity Revisited, was released digitally on The Leaf Label in December, with physical copies available in January 2016.

Bourne's second solo album, moogmemory, was released on The Leaf Label on 4 March 2016. This is the only album ever recorded with only the Lintronics Advanced Memorymoog, a Memorymoog synthesiser converted by Rudi Linhard in a process which is the "equivalent of open heart surgery" replacing "1,300 components over eight weeks". A companion EP entitled moogmemory plus was released in November 2016. The first three tracks were composed during the process of creating moogmemory, but the release also includes new material and a cover version of "Sussudio" by Phil Collins.

Bourne returned to the piano for 2017's Isotach. The music was recorded over an 18-month period at Bourne's home in West Yorkshire, mostly captured in snatched moments between soundtrack scores and session work. The Guardian described the record as "spartan, hypnotic and beautiful, if gloriously unresolved" and stated that Bourne was playing "as if...thrilled by the sound of a piano".

In 2018, Matthew Bourne was featured on the album Nightports w/ Matthew Bourne by Nightports. Material for the album was recorded over three sessions in two locations. First at Matthew Bourne's house near Keighley, West Yorkshire in March 2015. The second and third sessions took place at Besbrode Pianos in Leeds in October 2015 and June 2016. Material from Nightports w/ Matthew Bourne was premiered on three pianos with live manipulations at Middleton Hall as part of the Hull City Of Culture programme.

Bourne collaborated with Leaf Label partner Keeley Forsyth on her 2020 album Debris and EP Photograph, as well as releasing an EP of remixes of music from his moogmemory plus EP featuring Graham Massey, Sam Hobbs, Nostalgia 77, Broadway Project, Chris Sharkey, and Rex Rebo. This was made available as a Bandcamp exclusive.

== Discography ==
Collaborations

- The Electric Dr M (with The Electric Dr M) (2004)
- Lost Something (with Bourne/Davis/Kane) (2008)
- Dismantling The Waterfall (with Dave Stapleton) (2008)
- Call Me Madame (Good News From Nowhere) (with Franck Vigroux) (2009)
- Moment To Moment (with Dave Kane, Steve Davis and Paul Dunmall) (2009)
- The Money Notes (with Bourne/Davis/Kane) (2010)
- Chansons D'amour (with Laurent Dehors) (2012)
- Mandalas In The Sky (with Dave Kane, Steve Davis and Paul Dunmall) (2015)
- Radioland: Radio-Activity Revisited (with Franck Vigroux) (2015)
- The Earthworm's Eye View (with Tipping Point) (2015)
- Nightports w/Matthew Bourne (2018) (with Nightports)
- Chimet (2024) (with MINING)
- Dulcitone 1804 (2024) (with Nightports)

As a solo artist

- The Molde Concert (2005)
- Montauk Variations (2012)
- moogmemory (2016)
- moogmemory plus (EP, 2016)
- Isotach (2017)
- For Basil Kirchin (Digital, 2017)
- Irrealis (2022)
- This Is Not For You. (2024)

== Awards ==
- Perrier Young Jazz Award, Musician Category, 2001
- BBC Radio Jazz Awards, Innovation Award, 2002
- International Jazz Festivals Organization International Jazz Award, 2005
- Braaid Eisteddfod, Overseas Award, Instrumental Competition, 2007
- International Visual Communications Association Bronze Award for Music (shared with Dan Berridge), 2007
