= The Music Gallery =

- Formation: 1976
- Founder: members of the improvisational experimental group CCMC
- Location: Toronto, Ontario

The Music Gallery is an independent performance venue in Toronto, Ontario, Canada. It is known as a space for musical and interdisciplinary projects in experimental genres. The Music Gallery is publicly funded through arts grants from the city, province, and country, and through membership and ticket sales.

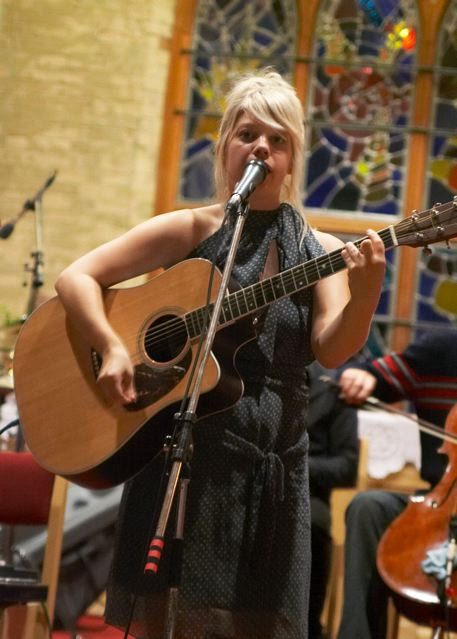
Musician Basia Bulat performing inside the Music Gallery at St George the Martyr in Toronto.

== History ==
The Music Gallery was founded in 1976, by members of the improvisational experimental group CCMC. The musicians ran the space and performed there regularly until 2000. CCMC artists also established the Music Gallery Editions record label and Musicworks.

The Music Gallery's motto is "Toronto's Centre for Creative Music." John Oswald, in an editorial describing the founding of Musicworks, described it as "an experimental music performance facility." Others have called it "one of the city's most magical, best-kept secrets," "a vital venue," "seedbed for cultural multiplicity and emerging hybridity," and "one of Toronto's cultural gems."

=== Locations ===
From its founding in 1976 until 1983, the Music Gallery was in a converted warehouse at 30 St. Patrick Street, including offices for Musicworks from 1978 onwards.

From 1983 to 1993, the venue was at 1087 Queen West, in the basement of what was originally West Toronto's first YMCA, a space now known as the Great Hall (which has fostered other cultural groups such as the Theatre Centre and the YYZ Gallery).

From 1991 to 2000, the Music Gallery occupied a space at 179 Richmond Street West. The Music Gallery's website describes it as "the fabled multi-purpose space" and "a strange oasis for creativity and experimentation on the outskirts of Toronto’s uber-commercialized entertainment district.” This venue hosted up to 150 concerts a year, until they were evicted in 2000. For a year, the Music Gallery was a “Guerrilla Gallery” throwing events in various alternate venues.

In 2001, it was located in St. George the Martyr Church, at 197 John Street. The venue had a unique agreement with the church and its parishioners (as well as those who live in the church's residences) that allowed for office space, and early-evening programming within the sanctuary itself. Because the venue must obey sound law and stop all performances at 11pm, they invested energies in daytime programming and all-ages events. The Music Gallery moved into 918 Bathurst Street in August 2018.

== Programming ==
The Music Gallery has used "streams" of programming to organize its diverse genres and foci. These streams have included Classic Avant, Jazz Avant, Pop Avant, World Avant, and New World. The Gallery ceased programming in streams in 2014.

Since 2006, the Music Gallery has run the annual X Avant Festival as a season launch in the fall. The festival is a way to invite musicians from all of the Gallery's streams and genres into one event. The 10th anniversary X Avant X (also celebrating the Gallery's 40th anniversary) featured Lori Freedman, CCMC, Tyondai Braxton, Sandro Perri, and Absolutely Free.

Previous festivals and collaborations include an electronic music festival in collaboration with A Space, shows with the Wavelength Concert Series, and interdisciplinary performances with the Images Festival.

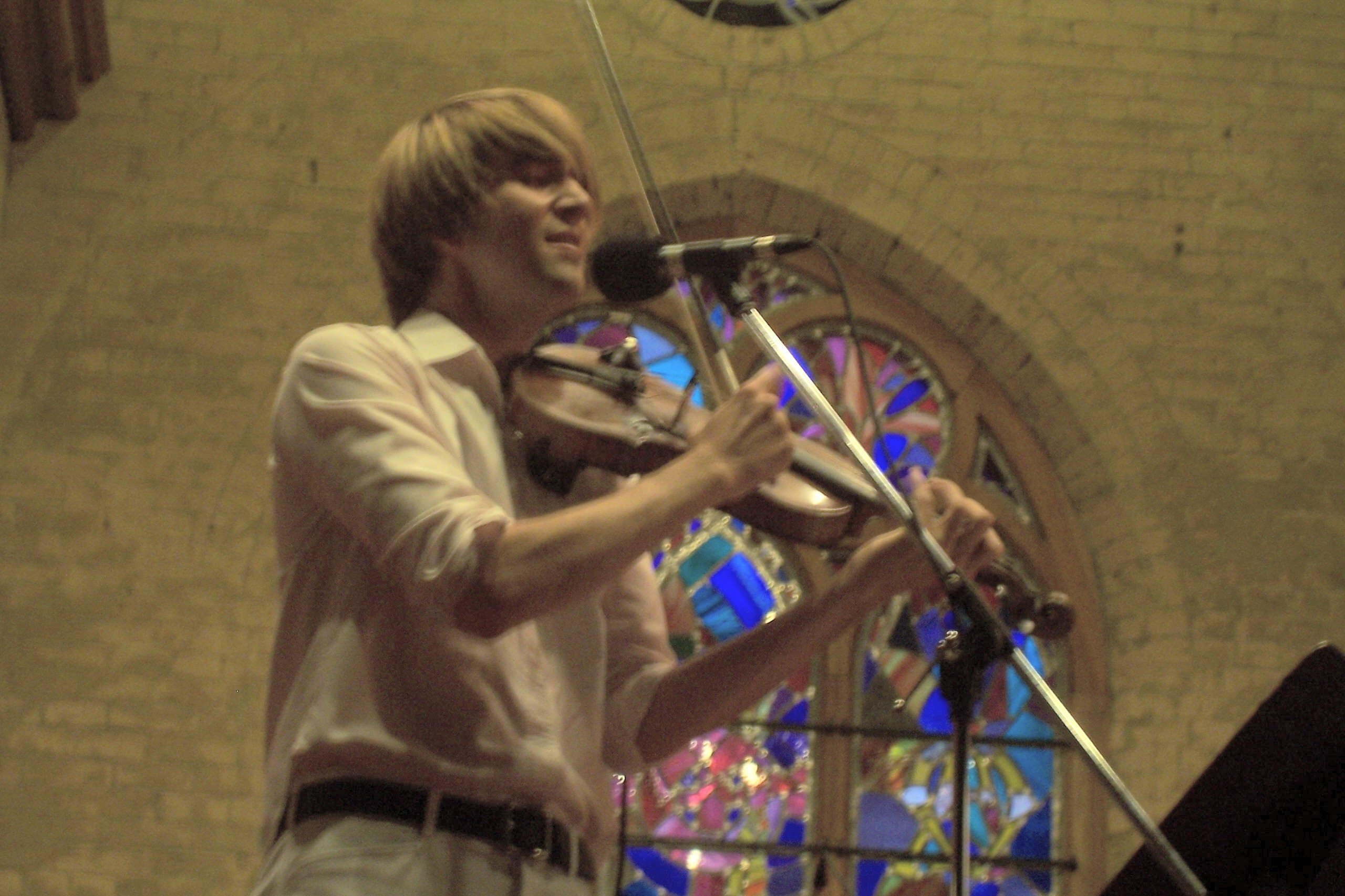
Owen Pallett, a.k.a. Final Fantasy, performing at The Music Gallery.

Notable performers in past years include the Nihilist Spasm Band, Sunn O))), Owen Pallett, Hauschka, Jennifer Castle, Wyrd Visions, John Oswald, Casey Sokol, Stars of the Lid, Derek Bailey, the Microphones, Jens Lekman, A Tribe Called Red, and Devendra Banhart.

The Music Gallery started a weekly radio show called "Radio Music Gallery" in 1983, on CKLN-FM; the show played recorded performances from the venue. Gallery performances are also regularly broadcast on CBC Radio.

In 2011, the Music Gallery had a season-closing fundraiser called "Tonalism" that lasted twelve hours and featured projected visuals and musicians including Julia Holter, Dntel, Teebs, and Isla Craig.

In 2015, the Music Gallery hosted a discussion panel on racism in the Toronto and Canadian music scene, moderated by April Aliermo, after several controversial events in the industry, including a band with a racially offensive name being boycotted, and several cancelled events that were protested for being colonial and patronizing.

== Music Gallery recordings ==
The Music Gallery Editions record label was active from 1977 to 1981. Twenty-seven albums were issued, mostly performances at the gallery, but also collections of Iroquois and Inuit music, Quebec folk music, and recordings of whales.

Artist(s)	Title	Catalogue number
Peter Anson, Larry Dubin, Nobuo Kubota, Allan Mattes, Michael Snow, Casey Sokol	CCMC Volume 1	MGE1
Peter Anson, Larry Dubin, Nobuo Kubota, Allan Mattes, Michael Snow, Casey Sokol	CCMC Volume 2	MGE2
An Artists' Jazz Band	Live at the Edge	MGE3
David Rosenboom	On Being Invisible	MGE4
Interspecies, with Steve Aikenhead, Luce Gautier, Robert Kaiser, Ross Mendes, Pierre Oullet, Harri Palm, Harry Pavelson, Mare Tiido	Whalescape	MGE5
Peter Anson, Larry Dubin, Nobuo Kubota, Allan Mattes, Michael Snow, Casey Sokol	CCMC Volume 3	MGE6
Peggy Sampson	The Contemporary Viola da Gamba	MGE7
The Canadian Electronic Ensemble, with David Grimes, David Jaeger, Larry Lake, Jim Montgomery, Karen Kaiser	Live Electronic Music	MGE8
Casey Sokol, Eugene Chadbourne	Improvised Music for Acoustic Piano & Guitar	MGE9
Paul Hodge, Marvin Green, Miguel Franconi, John Kuipers, V. Eric Cadesky	The Glass Orchestra	MGE10
Victor Coleman, Al Mattes, Larry Dubin, Michael Snow, Bill Smith, Casey Sokol	33 /3: Vic d'Or	MGE11
John Oswald, Henry Kaiser	Improvised	MGE12
John Boyle, John Clement, Greg Curnoe, Bill Exley, Murray Favro, Hugh McIntyre, Art Pratten	The Nihilist Spasm Band, Volume 2	MGE13
Andrew Culver, Keith Daniel, Pierre Dostie, Charles de Mestral, Chris Howard, Linda Pavelka	Sonde en concert	MGE14
Peter Anson, Larry Dubin, Nobuo Kubota, Allan Mattes, Michael Snow, Casey Sokol	Larry Dubin and CCMC	MGE15
Gordon Buck, Hubert Buck Sr., Hubert Buck Jr., Amos Keye Jr.	Yeh Yeh Wen Sa Gey/Had Nad Tren Nute Tah (Iroquois Social Music)	MGE16
Johnny Dugas, Noel Tremblay	Sur la Cote Nord (Folk Music of Tadousac)	MGE17
Lubomyr Melnyk	K M H (Piano Music in the Continuous Mode)	MGE18
Chester Beachell, John Ford, Pierre Ouelet	Northern Whales	MGE19
James MacDonald	Pieces for Solo Horn	MGE21
Peter Anson, Nobuo Kubota, Allan Mattes, Michael Snow, Casey Sokol	Free Soap (CCMC Volume 4)	MGE22
Henry Kaiser, John Oswald, Toshinori Kondo	Moose and Salmon	MGE29
Nobuo Kubota, Allan Mattes, Michael Snow, Casey Sokol	Without a Song (CCMC Volume 4)	MGE32
Al Neil, Howard Broomfield	Boot and Frog	MGE33
Composers' Brass Group	Canadian Anthology Volume 1	MGE34
David Mott	From Distant Places	MGE35

(The published index notes that after MGE19 "at this point the catalogue numbering becomes erratic.")

There was one release in the Canadian Music Heritage Collection, Inuit Throat and Harp Songs, by Inuit women of Povungnituk (catalogue number MH001).

Many other recordings exist of Music Gallery performances. The Music Gallery fonds at the Clara Thomas Archives and Special Collections at York University contains the archive of recordings before 1998, including audio reels, cassettes, and PCM recordings on VHS tapes of both live music and lectures, panels, and discussions.

Music Gallery Editions published a book, Decade: The First Ten Years of the Music Gallery, in 1985.

Jazz musician Peter Katz also released a live album, Live At The Music Gallery, in 2001.

== Directors, Curators, and Staff ==
Director	Role	Tenure
Peter Anson	Artistic Director	1976–1980
Al Mattes	Artistic Director	1976–1987
Jim Montgomery	Artistic Director	1987–2005
John Gzowski	Artistic Director	2006–2008
Johnathan Bunce	Artistic Director	2006–2011
David Dacks	Artistic Director	2011–2020
Sanjeet Takhar	Artistic Director	2020–present
Dewi Minden	Executive Director	2007–2010
Monica Pearce	Executive Director	2013–2018
Kayla McGee	Executive Director	2018-2020
David Dacks	Executive Director	2021-2023
Matthew Fava	Executive Director	2023–present
Gregory Oh	Guest Curator	2009–2013
Chelsea Sanoff	Guest Curator	2014–2016
Paul Hodge	Technical Director	1978–present
Sandor Ajzenstat	Lighting Designer	1980–present

== Bibliography ==
- Decade: The First Ten Years of the Music Gallery. Toronto/Amsterdam: Music Gallery Editions. 1985.
