= Plunderphonics 69/96 =

Compilation album by John Oswald
- Released: April 3, 2001
- Recorded: 1969–1996
- Genre: Plunderphonics
- Length: 2:33:20
- Label: Fony/Seeland
- Producer: John Oswald

John Oswald chronology
Grayfolded (1995)	Plunderphonics 69/96 (2001)

Professional ratings
Review scores
Source	Rating
Allmusic	link

Plunderphonics 69/96 is a two-CD compilation album by John Oswald that compiles most of Oswald's infamous Plunderphonics recordings, including the 1989 Plunderphonic self-released giveway album that ran afoul of the Canadian Recording Industry (CRIA), and the Elektrax promotional EP that had been originally commissioned by Elektra Records.

== Packaging ==
Unlike the previous releases compiled here, most artists and bands credited here are done so as anagrams of their original names. The "69/96" in the title derives from the fact that Oswald created the recordings represented therein between 1969 and 1996. These numbers are also used in the package design to stand in for quote marks around Oswald's "plunderphonics" neologism.

Oswald originally intended to release the album on his own Fony Records imprint, but allegedly was unable to arrange with all the appropriated parties he had quoted in licensing the tracks, and was therefore about to abandon publication when American experimental music group Negativland stepped in and released the project on their own micro-label Seeland Records, independent of Oswald and his licensing deals.

According to a statement he makes in the album's interview booklet, Oswald intended the album to be packaged as a box set so that record stores would be forced to file the album in the more visible and musically diverse box set area rather than in an experimental music section in the back of the record store. Since Oswald's name does not appear on the outside package, the box set would be filed as if Plunderphonics was the artist/band name, between Luciano Pavarotti and Prince.

The two discs are categorized and identified as "Songs" and "Tunes". The tracks represented on "Songs" are based on rock and pop music, while the "Tunes" disc has cuts based on classical, jazz and other instrumental music.

The second disc is mastered so that it actually begins with track number 27, rather than track 1. This technical variation nonetheless made it impossible for some Plunderphonics fans, especially those using Apple computers, to either play the second disc on their computer or rip MP3 files for use in digital media devices like the iPod, unless "particular software" identified on the Plunderphonics website at the time was used.

"z24" is an excerpt from Strauss' Also sprach Zarathustra, made by overlapping 24 different orchestra recordings.

== Track listing ==
"songs" disk
No.	Title	Music	Year	Length
1.	"btls"	Margo Integer	1989	0:56
2.	"power"	Deep Zen Pill w/ Brother Bam Shock	1975	3:46
3.	"o'hell"	Sir Jim Moron	1990	3:39
4.	"2net"	Cwene w/ Alice Malt	1990	1:24
5.	"anon"	Timely Buck	1990	4:18
6.	"vane"	Sonic Mylar w/ Erastus Spyfact	1990	3:20
7.	"mother"	5cm	1990	2:00
8.	"z"	Icky Dante	1990	0:20
9.	"angle"	Luis Erect	1990	2:41
10.	"way"	Asher Ogre Groin	1987	2:48
11.	"sfield"	Lhennj Ono	1980	0:31
12.	"ebb"	Spheric Plot	1990	2:35
13.	"madmod"	Dame Conic Cannon	1998	2:19
14.	"brazilianaires theme"	Lisbon Raincoat Mojo	1996	2:30
15.	"bday"	Taco Pizza Five	1996	1:56
16.	"philosophry"	Donna Nice Eros	1992	1:14
17.	"cuss"	Enid Van Volt	1988	0:13
18.	"explo"	Jensen Pox Lesion Blues Corp	1996	2:29
19.	"sonic euthanasia"	Cushion Toy	1994	0:59
20.	"cyfer"	Guy Nib of Nine Canals	1992	1:48
21.	"pretender"	Dally Proton	1988	3:35
22.	"dont"	Vessel Ripley	1989	2:51
23.	"white"	Gibbons Cry	1989	4:24
24.	"black"	Jem Snowbar	1989	2:02
25.	"brown"	News Orb Jam	1989	3:56
26.	"dab"	Alien Chasm Jock	1989	7:12
27.	"case of death (part one, chapters 1-16)"	Hi Strategic Aha	1991	5:59
28.	"fabulous"	Kid C. Mynah	1983	2:32

"tunes" disk
No.	Title	Music	Year	Length
27.	"case of death (part two, chapters 1-9)"	Artie Hitch Saga	1991	3:18
28.	"andy (dang fishy rift)"	Daffy Shitgrin	1977	0:54
29.	"z24"	Sushi Dart Scar	1993	1:28
30.	"net"	Camel Tail	1989	1:13
31.	"birth1"	Pecan Army Cult	1989	1:13
32.	"mist"	Ibex Bribdeck	1987	1:53
33.	"barely"	Buck Cherry	1969	0:05
34.	"birth2"	Tuna Cycle Pram	1969	1:14
35.	"prelude"	ZZ Snarlfit	1990	0:55
36.	"mach"	Quark Tone Sort	1993	4:26
37.	"barely"	Huck Cyrber	1969	0:09
38.	"barely"	Huck Cyrber	1969	0:10
39.	"barely"	Huck Cyrber	1969	0:08
40.	"barely"	Huck Cyrber	1969	0:16
41.	"birth3"	Racy Tune Clamp	1989	0:46
42.	"rose"	Big Dan Mac	1988	1:54
43.	"ten4gv"	Abner Newton & Brain in Slow	1986	0:24
44.	"debizet"	Geese Ritz Bog & Usable Scud Dye	1991	3:34
45.	"pocket"	Ace Sob Unit	1987	3:13
46.	"tune"	Edge Pipe Virus	1988	1:59
47.	"fold"	Data Gel Freud	1995	2:10
48.	"mirror"	Tyler Calico	1988	4:02
49.	"dWig"	Wieldung Ven Ovenbath	1991	3:02
50.	"7th"	Devil Gun Won't Behave	1988	3:06
51.	"lune"	Dudley Buscase	1995	2:32
52.	"aria"	Doll Egg Nun	1989	3:49
53.	"spring"	Sir Istvan Gorky	1980	1:18
54.	"discorite"	Tsar Rosy Viking	1996	1:38
55.	"lovedrops"	Tara Burch-Bach, et al.	1989	1:22
56.	"v&"	Evolving Nude Web Hat	1991	1:07
57.	"preLieu"	Wave Unbeloved Thing	1991	6:17
58.	"para d"	Tieske Ear	1986	11:04
59.	"rainbow ▾"	Randall Hero	1989	4:30
60.	"1001"	Horrendous Trance Sigh Trend	1993	3:53

=== Notes ===
- The Bandcamp version of the "tunes" disk has a different track listing order and includes a bonus track called "bat mambo", credited to Mata Bomb.
