= Debris (Keeley Forsyth album) =

Studio album by Keeley Forsyth
- Released: 17 January 2020
- Label: The Leaf Label
- Producer: Sam Hobbs

Debris is the debut album by British actress and musician Keeley Forsyth, released in 2020.

== Background ==
The songs for Debris were initially written by Forsyth, accompanying herself on harmonium and accordion. The pieces were then arranged collaboratively with musician Matthew Bourne, who Forsyth contacted after hearing him on the radio.

The Quietus described the album as a "brooding, melancholic listen, full of gut-wrenching lines".

The first single, "Debris", was released on 22 October 2019 accompanied by a video directed by Maxine Peake. Second single "Start Again" was released on 28 November 2019. Clash magazine called the song "a bold display of creative confidence".

== Track listing ==
All compositions by Forsyth. Arranged by Forsyth, Matthew Bourne and Sam Hobbs.

1. "Debris" – 2:43
2. "Black Bull" – 3:02
3. "It's Raining" – 4:27
4. "Look to Yourself" – 4:53
5. "Lost" – 2:40
6. "Butterfly" – 3:50
7. "Large Oak" - 2:24
8. "Start Again" - 3:26

== See also ==
- List of 2020 albums
