= Steve Davis (Northern Irish drummer) =

Steve Davis (born in Bangor, County Down, Northern Ireland) is a professional percussionist and drummer. Davis has been active in such fields in the UK and Europe and is known as much for his jazz drumming as his free improvisational style of playing.

== Education ==
- Bangor Technical College with composer and bandleader Brian Irvine.
- Bretton Hall College of the University of Leeds where he studied with Dave Kane.

== Career ==
- Davis has played with European Jazz Orchestra and British Jazz legends including Django Bates, Evan Parker, Julian Siegel, Dylan Bates, Annie Whitehead, Ben Castle, Paul Dunmall and Jacqui Dankworth
- He has also performed with many European and American musicians including Dick Oats, Curtis Fuller and Marc Ribot
- He is the drummer in Bourne/Davis/Kane

== Discography ==
=== Bourne/Davis/Kane ===
- Lost Something (August 2008) Edition Records EDN1003

=== Bourne/Davis/Kane with Paul Dunmall ===
- Moment To Moment

=== Human ===
- Being Human (2013) Babel. With Alexander Hawkins (piano), Dylan Bates (violin), Alex Bonney (trumpet)

== Reviews of recorded work ==
- Review of "Lost Something", The Independent, 24 August 2008.
- Review of "Lost Something", The Guardian, 12 September 2008.
