= Radioland: Radio-Activity Revisited =

Studio album by Matthew Bourne and Franck Vigroux
- Released: 4 December 2015
- Genres: electronic, avant-garde, experimental
- Length: 45:00
- Label: The Leaf Label
- Producers: Franck Vigroux and Matthew Bourne

Radioland: Radio-Activity Revisited is a studio album by English improvising pianist and synthesiser player Matthew Bourne and French electronic composer Franck Vigroux, created to mark the 40th anniversary of Kraftwerk's seminal album Radio-Activity. It was released digitally by The Leaf Label on 4 December 2015, with physical copies following in early 2016.

== Background ==
The project began when Bourne and Vigroux were commissioned by SoundUK an Arts Council England to reinterpret the material from Radio-Activity. Having already worked together on an album entitled Call Me Madame, the duo were joined by artist Antoine Schmitt creating live visuals. They embarked on six-date UK tour between the 13 and 23 March 2015, which saw Bourne performing on a variety of analogue synthesisers rather than at a piano.

Jazzwise described the music as "a darkly intriguing contemporary spin on the seminal Teutonic band Kraftwerk’s electronic concept" in a review of the trio's London performance, adding that the project felt like a "less naïve, more unsettling, intense soundscape than a mid-1970s era Kraftwerk could ever have dreamt up. Bourne artfully improvises around the original album’s poppy hooks, as on the memorable title track theme that’s played against an ear-shattering electro throb that gives it something of a menacing air. Contrasting with the original’s romantic utopian concept, this felt more like the harsher, more unstable radioactive glow of contemporary dystopia. Yet with the warm ambience of analogue circuitry and Vigroux’s use of vocoder vocal, a more tender, human side came through just as convincingly."

Bourne and Vigroux then went into the studio to record the album, which was mastered by Denis Blackham, who mastered Kraftwerk's 1974 album Autobahn. The album artwork was designed by Antoine Schmitt, based upon the visuals he had created for the group's live show. The LP edition is limited to just 1,000 copies for the world and the CD to 2,000 copies. Both versions include liner notes by David Stubbs, author of Future Days: Krautrock and the Building of Modern Germany.

== Track listing ==
All songs written by Ralf Huetter/Florian Schneider except "Radioactivity", "Radioland", "Airwaves", "Antenna", "Radio Stars" and "Uranium" written by Ralf Huetter/Florian Schneider-Esleben/Emil Schult. Arranged Franck Vigroux and Matthew Bourne.

No.	Title	Length
1.	"Geiger Counter"	2:07
2.	"Radioactivity"	5:07
3.	"Radioland"	4:50
4.	"Airwaves"	5:16
5.	"Intermission / News"	1:17
6.	"The Voice Of Energy"	2:57
7.	"Antenna"	7:04
8.	"Radio Stars"	6:07
9.	"Uranium"	2:52
10.	"Transistor"	4:25
11.	"Ohm Sweet Ohm"	3:17

== Personnel ==
- Franck Vigroux – Electronics
- Matthew Bourne – Synthesisers, voice
