= Plunderphonics =

Music genre

- Stylistic origins: Sound collage; electronic; musique concrete; hip hop; turntablism; sampledelia; library music; spoken word; found sound; film score; public broadcasting
- Cultural origins: 1980s
- Typical instruments: Sampler; tape recorder
- Derivative forms: Hauntology; vaporwave

Plunderphonics is a music genre in which tracks are constructed by sampling recognizable musical works. The term was coined by composer John Oswald in 1985 in his essay "Plunderphonics, or Audio Piracy as a Compositional Prerogative", and eventually explicitly defined in the liner notes of his Grayfolded album. Plunderphonics is a form of sound collage. Oswald has described it as a referential and self-conscious practice which interrogates notions of originality and identity.

Although the concept of plunderphonics is broad, in practice there are many common themes used in what is normally called plunderphonic music. This includes heavy sampling of educational films of the 1950s, news reports, radio shows, or anything with trained vocal announcers. Oswald's contributions to this genre rarely used these materials, the exception being his rap-like 1975 track "Power", which combined a Led Zeppelin instrumental with a sermon of a Southern US evangelist.

The process of sampling other sources is found in various genres (notably hip-hop and especially turntablism), but in plunderphonic works, the sampled material is often the only sound used. These samples are usually uncleared and sometimes result in legal action being taken due to copyright infringement. Some plunderphonic artists use their work to protest what they consider to be overly restrictive copyright laws. Many plunderphonic artists claim their use of other artists' materials falls under the fair use doctrine.

Development of the process is when creative musicians plunder an original track and overlay new material and sounds on top until the original piece is masked and then removed, though often using scales and beats. It is a studio-based technique used by such groups as the American experimental band the Residents (who used Beatles tracks), and other noted exponents including Negativland, the Dust Brothers, DJ Shadow and the Avalanches.

== Early examples ==
Although the term plunderphonics tends to be applied only to music made since Oswald coined it in the 1980s, there are several examples of earlier music made along similar lines. Notably, Dickie Goodman and Bill Buchanan's 1956 single "The Flying Saucer", features Goodman as a radio reporter covering an alien invasion interspersed with samples from various contemporary records.

According to Chris Cutler, "It wasn't until 1961 that an unequivocal exposition of plunderphonic techniques arrived in James Tenney's celebrated Collage No. 1 ('Blue Suede'), a manipulation of Elvis Presley's hit record 'Blue Suede Shoes'. The gauntlet was down; Tenney had picked up a 'non art', lowbrow work and turned it into 'art'; not as with scored music by writing variations on a popular air, but simply by subjecting a gramophone record to various physical and electrical procedures." According to Oswald, "the difference with 'Blue Suede' is how it audaciously used a very recognizable existing recording of another musical work. This blatant appropriation pioneered the discovery, for myself and many others, of an ocean of sampling and plunderphonics in following decades."

The Residents' "Beyond The Valley Of A Day In The Life" consists of excerpts from Beatles records. Various club DJs in the 1970s re-edited the recordings they played, and although this often consisted of nothing more than extending the record by adding a chorus or two, this too could be considered a form of plunderphonics.

Some classical composers have performed a kind of plunderphonia on written, rather than recorded, music. The composer Lukas Foss composed his Baroque Variations in 1967, whose three movements involved the performance of a Baroque work which provided the framework (sometimes inaudibly) for a fresh composition. Perhaps the best-known example is the third movement of Luciano Berio's Sinfonia, in which multiple quotations from the music of other composers are superimposed on a complete performance of the second movement from Mahler's second symphony. Alfred Schnittke and Mauricio Kagel have also made extensive use of earlier composers' works. Earlier composers who often plundered the music of others include Charles Ives (who often quoted folk songs and hymns in his works) and Ferruccio Busoni (a movement from his 1909 piano suite An die Jugend includes a prelude and a fugue by Johann Sebastian Bach played simultaneously). During the '90s Oswald composed many such scores for classical musicians which he classified with the term Rascali Klepitoire.

In France, Jean-Jacques Birgé has been working on "radiophonies" since 1974 (for his film "La Nuit du Phoque"), capturing radio and editing the samples in real-time with the pause button of a radio-cassette. His group Un Drame Musical Instantané recorded "Crimes parfaits" on LP "A travail égal salaire égal" in 1981, explaining the whole process in the piece itself and calling it "social soundscape". He applied the same technique to TV in 1986 on the "Qui vive?" CD and published on the 1998 CD "Machiavel" with Antoine Schmitt, an interactive video scratch using 111 very small loops from his own past LPs.

== Plunderphonics (EP) ==
Plunderphonics was used as the title of an EP release by John Oswald. Oswald's original use of the word was to indicate a piece that was created from samples of a single artist and no other material. Influenced by William S. Burroughs' cut-up technique, he began making plunderphonic recordings in the 1970s. In 1988 he distributed copies of the Plunderphonics EP to the press and to radio stations. It contained four tracks: "Pretender" featured a single of Dolly Parton singing "The Great Pretender" progressively slowed down on a Lenco Bogen turntable so that she eventually sounds like a man; "Don't" was Elvis Presley's recording of the titular song overlaid with samples from the recording and overdubs by various musicians, including Bob Wiseman, Bill Frisell and Michael Snow; "Spring" was an edited version of Igor Stravinsky's The Rite of Spring, shuffled around and with different parts played on top of one another; "Pocket" was based on Count Basie's "Corner Pocket", edited so that various parts loop a few times.

== Plunderphonic (album) ==
In 1989 Oswald released a greatly expanded CD version of Plunderphonics with twenty-five tracks. As on the EP, each track used material by just one artist. It reworked material by both popular musicians like The Beatles, and classical works such as Ludwig van Beethoven's Symphony No. 7. Like the EP, it was never offered for sale. A central idea behind the record was that the fact that all the sounds were "stolen" should be quite blatant. The packaging listed the sources of all the samples used, but authorization for them to be used on the record was neither sought nor given. All undistributed copies of plunderphonic were destroyed after a threat of legal action from the Canadian Recording Industry Association on behalf of several of their clients (notably Michael Jackson, whose song "Bad" had been chopped into tiny pieces and rearranged as "Dab") who alleged copyright abuses. Various press statements by record industry representatives revealed that a particular item of contention was the album cover art which featured a transformed image of Michael Jackson as a naked woman derived from his Bad cover.

== Later works ==
Plexure (1993) featured what Oswald coined "electroquotations" (exact clones of portions of commercial digital soundfiles, as found on audio CDs, of over 1,000 tracks that were commercially released between 1982 and 1993, the first decade of the CD era. Thousands of these "electroquotated" fragments are layered according to their position in a tempo spectrum that, after introductory material, accelerates throughout the piece.

Oswald was subsequently approached by Phil Lesh to use Grateful Dead material on what became the album Grayfolded (1994/5).

Plunderphonics 69/96 (2001) is a compilation of Oswald's work, from 1969 to 1996, including tracks from the original plunderphonic CD.

== Notable works by others ==
The term "plunderphonic" is used today in a looser sense to indicate any music completely—or almost completely—made up of samples.

DJ Shadow has often been referred to as a pivotal figure in plunderphonics starting with his 1996 album Endtroducing....., with his work being seminally used by later proponents.

Other notable DJs include Mr Scruff (Andy Carthy). His hit "Get a Move On!", from his 1999 album Keep It Unreal, is built around "Bird's Lament (In Memory of Charlie Parker)" by Moondog and has been used in several commercials, ranging from Lincoln and Volvo automobiles to France Télécom and GEICO insurance. The song also sampled vocals from T-Bone Walker's "Hypin' Woman Blues", and contains samples of the song "That's the Blues" by Rubberlegs Williams.

The Avalanches have also been referred to as seminal artists in the genre, in particular with their album Since I Left You, released in 2000, which has been noted as an important pivotal work.

Both Philip Sherburne writing for Rhapsody and Joseph Krol, writing in Varsity, said that Endtroducing..... and Since I Left You were the two most important plunderphonics albums, with Krol also including J Dilla's Donuts which followed in 2006.

In 1992, French noise rock band Paneuropean Architecture released the album Toi Jeune!, referring to John Oswald's work. The album was reissued in 2006 and titled "plundernoize".

== See also ==
- Pogo (musician) – often referred to as a musician in the plunderphonics genre
- YouTube Poop
