= Radioland =

Radioland may refer to:

- Radioland (album) by Nicolette Larson, 1981
- Radioland: Radio-Activity Revisited, 2015 album by Matthew Bourne
- "Radio Land", 1984 song by Michael Martin Murphey
