= Moogmemory =

moogmemory

Studio album by Matthew Bourne
- Released: 4 March 2016
- Genre: electronic, avant-garde, experimental
- Label: The Leaf Label
- Producer: Matthew Bourne and Sam Hobbs

Matthew Bourne chronology
Montauk Variations (2012)	moogmemory (2016)

moogmemory is the second solo studio album by English improvising pianist and synthesiser player Matthew Bourne. His first studio album, Montauk Variations, was a series of compositions for solo piano, but moogmemory sees Bourne performing only on the Lintronics Advanced Memorymoog, a specially altered Memorymoog synthesiser. The album was released on 4 March 2016 on The Leaf Label.

== Background ==
Despite his reputation as a pianist, in 2013 Bourne was commissioned by the Marsden Jazz Festival to perform a programme of solo synthesiser music, and he titled the project The Matthew Bourne Synthesiser Show in tribute to the work of Annette Peacock and Paul Bley. In this performance Bourne performed on a variety of analogue synthesisers including an "uncooperative" 1982 Memorymoog. After this project, Bourne had the Memorymoog sent to Germany where Rudi Lanhard converted it into the Lintronics Advanced Memorymoog (LAMM), the instrument on which moogmemory would be performed and recorded. The process of turning the Memorymoog into the LAMM is "the Memorymoog equivalent of open heart surgery, which replaces 1,300 components over eight weeks of bench time, costing as much as a new machine". The material for the album began from these improvised live performances, and was later honed by Bourne in his home studio in West Yorkshire. moogmemory is the first album ever recorded to feature only the Lintronics Advanced Memorymoog.

== Critical reception ==
Professional ratings
Aggregate scores
Source	Rating
Metacritic	75/100
Review scores
Source	Rating
AllMusic	4/5 stars
Clash	7/10
The Skinny	4/5 stars

On the Metacritic website, which aggregates reviews from critics and assigns a normalised rating out of 100, moogmemory received a score of 75, based on 1 mixed and 5 positive reviews. A favourable review from AllMusic called the album as "soft, shimmering, and sparse" and Clash described the album "finely-wrought electronic music that's just about as stirring as it's ever likely to get", awarding it a rating of 7/10. The album was praised in The Skinny and described as "a brave and rewarding left field adventure".

== Track listing ==
All tracks by Matthew Bourne. Recorded in Airedale and Wharfedale August–November 2014, apart from track 9 which was recorded at Marsden Jazz Festival, 12 October 2013.

No.	Title	Length
1.	"Somewhere I Have Never Travelled (For Coral Evans)"	7:07
2.	"Alexs"	6:46
3.	"Nils"	5:42
4.	"On Rivock Edge"	9:52
5.	"Sam"	4:36
6.	"Andrew"	4:08
7.	"Horn and Vellum"	6:54
8.	"Daniziel"	5:26
9.	"I Loved Her, Madly"	12:27

== Personnel ==
- Matthew Bourne - Lintronics Advanced Memorymoog
