= Vanessa Cavanagh =

English actress and singer

Vanessa Cavanagh (9 June 1983 – 3 November 2002) was an English actress and singer.

== Career 1996–2002 ==
Cavanagh first came to prominence as Amber in children's stage school drama The Biz in 1996–97 in which she sang, acted and danced.

She also took part in two episodes of The Famous Five as Jo, the gypsy girl in the 1990s adaptation of the Enid Blyton novels. In The Famous Five, her role was as one of their closest friends. Jo was very plucky, and annoying, but a great friend to the Five.

Following her initial acting success Cavanagh started to focus more on her music and in 2002 was thrust back into the public eye in the UK reality contest Pop Idol. She got through to the final fifty but did not progress to the finals.

In late 2002 she had reportedly signed a management contract and had recorded tracks. One of which would be released as her debut single.

== Death ==
On 3 November 2002, Cavanagh, who lived in Greenford in West London, was travelling in her boyfriend's Ford Escort when it crashed into a support pillar of the A4 near Chiswick. She was killed instantly.
