= Brian Irvine (composer) =

Northern Irish composer

Brian Irvine is a composer from Northern Ireland. His work has been characterized as avant-garde, incorporating elements of "free jazz, rock, rap, thrash, tango, lounge and contemporary classical" music. Irvine was Associate Composer with the Ulster Orchestra (2007–2011) and Professor of Creative Arts at the University of Ulster.

== Career ==
Born in Belfast his body of work includes operas, orchestral works, large-scale participatory work, film scores, multi media installations, dance works as well as ensemble, solo, and chamber pieces.

=== Roles and collaboration ===
He is Co-Artistic director of Dumbworld, a production company he formed with filmmaker John McIlduff in 2009, and was the first Associate Composer with the Ulster Orchestra from 2008 to 2012. In 2015 he became the first Music Laureate for the City of Belfast and in December of that year was named as the winner of the Paul Hamlyn Composers Award. For the last four years he has been Associate Professor of Creative Arts at the University of Ulster.

He has collaborated and been commissioned by many international artists and organisations including Welsh National Opera (UK), BBC Radio 3, RTE National Symphony Orchestra (Ireland), BBC Concert Orchestra (UK), (UK), Red Note Ensemble (UK), Valle d'Aosta Symphony Orchestra (Italy) and Northern Sinfonia (England).

Much of his output has involved collaborations with artists from other disciplines, including Seamus Heaney (poet, Ireland), Eduard Bersudsky (sculptor), Jennifer Walshe (composer/vocalist), John Mcilduff (filmmaker/director), Joanna Macgregor (piano), Jari Nemenin (filmmaker/director), Joel Simon (filmmaker/animator), Matthew Robbins (animator/artist), LAU (BBC Folk Award Winners), Ivor Cutler (poet, singer), Keiji Haino (guitar, Japan), David Holmes (producer/composer/DJ), Paul Dunmall (saxophone/reeds/bagpipes), Darragh Morgan (violin), and Owen McCafferty (playwright).

Together with his own ensemble he has toured extensively throughout the USA and Europe, appearing at several international music festivals and venues.

In 2017 completed a tour of Ireland, Northern Ireland, London and Scotland with a new chamber work, 13 Vices, a collaboration with composer/vocalist Jennifer Walshe, and is currently working on a new large-scale opera based on the life of Rosemary Kennedy. 13 Vices was selected to represent the UK in the 2017 New Music Biennale in Hull (City of Culture) and at the South Bank in London.

=== Opera and orchestral works ===
In 2014–2015 a series of five short operas, Things We Throw Away, was performed in 40 locations throughout the streets of Dublin and Belfast, and the animated orchestral children's oratorio Bluebottle was premiered by 500 singing children from Wicklow and the RTE National Symphony Orchestra at the Bord Gais Energy Theatre, Dublin.

Recent orchestral works include a collaboration with poet Seamus Heaney, Praise Aloud the Trees (25’) for double orchestra and choir commissioned by BBC Radio 3 and the large-scale work for orchestra and violin A Mon Seul Desir, which was premiered by Darragh Morgan (violin) and RTE National Symphony Orchestra as part of the RTE featured composer series at the National Concert Hall, Dublin.

In 2019, Least Like The Other, a one-act opera about the life of Rose Kennedy, premiered at the Black Box Theatre in Galway. The music was composed by Irvine, and the opera received a five-star review from the Irish Times.

== Awards and honours ==
He has been nominated for four British Academy (ASCAP) Awards; his Welsh National Opera commission, The Tailors Daughter, won the award for Opera in 2008. He has also won the BBC Radio 3 Jazz Award, MCPS Joyce Dixey Award, Major Individual Artist Award (Arts Council of Northern Ireland) and the 2011 Irish Allianz Arts and Business Award for “best use of creativity in the community” for the community opera Shelter me form the Rain.

In 2012 together with his Dumbworld collaborator he was appointed Northern Ireland's lead artist in the London 2012 Cultural Olympics and created NEST, a giant sonic sculptural installation created from 3000 collected objects donated from homes all over Northern Ireland, a symphony orchestra, and a 300-person community choir.

Irvine received two Ivor Novello Award nominations at The Ivors Classical Awards 2023. Least Like The Other: Searching For Rosemary Kennedy and The Scorched Earth Trilogy both received nominations for Best Stage Work. Least Like The Other went on to win the award for Best Stage Work 2023.

Irvine received an Ivor Novello Award nomination at The Ivors Classical Awards 2024. A Children's Guide to Anarchy (An Easterhouse Children's Manifesto) for ensemble and singers was nominated for Best Community and Participation Composition in association with ABRSM.

== Students ==
Irvine's students include Ed Bennett, Dave Kane, Steve Davis and Brian Robinson.
