= The Biz (TV series) =

- Genre: Drama; Soap
- Written by: Chris Ellis, Sarah-Louise Hawkins, Jeremy Front, Matthew Graham
- Directed by: David Andrews, Nigel Douglas, John Smith
- Theme music composer: Michael Omer
- Country of origin: United Kingdom
- Original language: English
- No. of series: 3
- No. of episodes: 24

Production
- Executive producer: Marilyn Fox
- Producers: Richard Callanan, John Smith
- Running time: 30 mins

Original release
- Network: BBC One
- Release: 15 February 1995 – 16 January 1997

The Biz is a BBC children's television drama series about a group of teenagers at a fictional stage school. The series was written by Chris Ellis, Jeremy Front, Matthew Graham and Sarah-Louise Hawkins. The directors were David Andrews (series one), Nigel Douglas (series two) and John Smith (series three). Wayne Fowkes was the choreographer and original music was composed by Michael Omer. It ran for three series (24 episodes) from 1994 to 1996.

== Plot ==
Set at Markov's School of Dance and Drama in Richmond, it was a portmanteau show in which different students took centre stage from week to week. It showed training, auditions and performances.

== Cast ==
=== Regulars ===
Actor	Character	Who are they?	Series One	Series Two	Series Three
Students/children
Marie Wevill	Pippa Jackson	Student	Y	Y	Y
Paul Nicholls	Tim Marshall	Student	Y	Y	(Y)
Hannah Lawrence	Julia "Jules" Hart	Student	Y	Y	Y
Lindsey Wise	Emma Holmes	Student	Y	Y	Y
Mohammed George (as Mahommed George)	Ben	Student	Y	Y	Y
Keeley Forsyth	Nicky Williams	Student	Y	Y	-
Nathan Constance	Luke Fredericks	Student	Y	Y	Y
Stephanie Bagshaw	Sasha Hamilton	Student	Y	Y	Y
Craig Stein	Mark	Student	Y	Y	Y
Sacha Pitimson	Chris Murray	Student	Y	Y	Y
Hilja Lindsay-Parkinson	Natalie Walton	Student	Y	Y	Y
John Glynn	Barry Wilson	Boarding house brother	Y	Y	Y
Andrew-Lee Potts (as Andrew Potts)	Leo	Student	-	Y	Y
Rhys Moore	Huw Williams	Student	-	Y	Y
Vanessa Cavanagh	Amber	Student	-	Y	Y
Rudolf Gordon	Jake	Student (Alice's brother)	-	Y	(Y)
Lindsay Payne	Alice	Student (Jake's sister)	-	Y	(Y)
Sarah French	Zara	Student	-	-	Y
Natalie Anderson	Francesca	Student (Leo's step-sister)	-	-	Y
Max Wrottesley	Vince	Student	-	-	Y
Zander Ward	Terry Ryan	Student	-	-	Y
Steven White	Zak	Rachel's son	-	-	Y
School staff
Terence Harvey	Gerry Clark	drama teacher (head teacher)	Y	Y	Y
Sally Spencer-Harris	Caro Hamilton	school secretary and Sasha's mother	Y	Y	(Y)
Delia Lindsay	Gaby Markov	head teacher	Y	Y	(Y)
Geoffrey Bayldon	Markov	school founder and Gaby's father	Y	-	-
Nicola Bryant	Martine Johnson	dance teacher	Y	Y	Y
Tim Adams/Tim Scott-Walker	Paul Jellico	drama teacher and office support	-	Y	Y
Ania Sowinski	Kerry	new school secretary and part-time student	-	-	Y

=== Extras ===
==== Series one ====
- Martyn Read as Mr Wilkins (science teacher)
- Rajan Cahn as Mr Gibson (music teacher)
- ?? as Mrs Russell (art teacher)
- Martin Beaumont as Mr Fellows (humanities teacher)
- Charles Baillie as Mr Holmes (Emma's father)
- Donna Doubtfire as Amanda (TV director)
- Lydia Hrela as Miranda (disinterested school interviewee)
- Albert Welling as Miranda's father
- Declan Mulholland as "tramp" (actor)
- Christopher Lamb as assistant TV director
- Ian Porter as Sam (theatre director)
- Norma Atallah as "mother" (actress)
- Judy Clifton as Katrina (Tim's agent)
- Derek Ware as photographer
- Geraldine Griffiths as Pam Williams (Nicky's mother)
- Jonathan Lacey as commercial director
- Tom Marshall as Tom Williams (Nicky's father)
- Zoe Ball as TV interviewer
- Ben Onwukwe as Steve Fredericks (Luke's father)
- Cassi Pool as Jackie Fredericks (Luke's step-mother)
- Ian Sanders as reporter

==== Series two ====
- James Petherick as Mr Alexander (science teacher)
- Victoria Plum as Mrs McAlpine (history/English teacher)
- Kelly Reilly as Laura (war film actress)
- Rebecca Tremain as Cassie (war film assistant director)
- Luke Healy as Charles (war film actor)
- Ralph Arlise as Alec (war film director)
- Sean Kempton as Jamie (war film actor)
- Audrey Jenkinson as Shonagh (chaperone)
- Lincoln Ascot as cameraman (war film)
- Kaya Trochy as clapper loader (war film)
- Lee Marriott as focus puller (war film)
- Andi Peters as Battle of the Bands presenter
- Paul Barber as Gary Masters (music producer)
- Debbi Blythe as Fiona Charles (daisy-chain executive)
- Robert Blythe as Owen Williams (Huw's father)
- Sam Scarrot as Danny (guitarist in Luke's band)
- Matthew Whittle as Toby (video producer)
- Clare Hardie as gofer (Jules' modelling fitting)
- James Traherne as John (sound engineer)
- Tony Maudsley as Roy (sound engineer)

==== Series three ====
- Michael Hobbs as history teacher
- Chris Stanton as John (musical director)
- Nelly Morrison as Rachel (musical actress & Zak's mother)
- Marie Walker as Michelle (child actress in musical)
- Coshti Dowden as Jason (child actor in musical)
- Gil Brailey as Kerry's mother
- Polly Irvin as Jude (TV director)
- Helen Pearson as Joanne (make-up designer)
- Maggie McCarthy as Bunny (chaperone & Barry's auntie)
- Jennifer Croxton as Ms McCready (actress in make-up chair)
- Maureen Sweeney as Mrs Ryan (Terry's mother)
- Justin Brady as Steve (Jules' photography friend)
- Robert Blythe as Owen Williams (Huw's father)
- Lynda Rooke as Phyllis (Huw's father's girlfriend/fiancée)
- Sabra Williams as Xanthe (TV film assistant director)
- Philip McGough as Ken Atkins (TV film director)
- Andrew Flynn as Sam Fraser (TV film cameraman)
- Mary Sheen as shop manageress
- Janice Acquah as Pippa's doctor
- John O'Toole as vagrant
- Marcia Tucker as Mrs Squire (Becky's mother)
- Sakinah Fraser as Becky Squire (school auditionee)
- Shanie Hanley as Daisy
- Ian Driver as Dan Naylor (BBC light entertainment producer)

== Production ==
=== Casting ===
Paul Nicholls, in one of his early roles, played up-and-coming star Tim Marshall. The role reflected his own later life as Tim had to deal with attention from the press and the public.

=== Songs ===
The Biz contained several original songs from composer Michael Omer.

==== Series One ====
- Main Title: "The Biz!" – cast
- "Glamorous" (E3) – Tim and Sasha
- "You Have To Find Your Own Way Through" (E5 and 6) – Luke, Jules and cast
- "Tonight" (E6) – Pippa
- "One To One" (E6) – Tim

==== Series Two ====
- Main Title: "The Biz!" – cast
- "If You Want Me To Stay" (E1 and 2) – Luke, Jules and the band
- "You Set Me on Fire" (E4-6) – Luke, Nicky and the band
- "Waiting For Tomorrow" (E6) – Pippa and cast

==== Series Three ====
- Main Title: "The Biz!" – cast
- "Just Do It!" (E12) - Jules, Vince, Francesca, Terry, Luke and band

=== Goofs ===
- Series Two, Episode 6: Pippa opens an unaddressed envelope and reads a blank piece of paper to find out she's got the part in the new musical!

== Broadcast ==
Series	Start date	End date	Episodes
1	15 February 1995	22 March 1995	6
2	5 December 1995	21 December 1995	6
3	3 December 1996	16 January 1997	12

The series has also aired on ABC in Australia.

== Reception ==
=== Ratings (CBBC Channel) ===
4 May 2002 - 30,000 (6th most watched on CBBC that week).
