= Bourne/Davis/Kane =

Trio of musicians

Bourne/Davis/Kane is a trio of musicians who perform free improvisation. The trio consists of:

- Matthew Bourne – piano
- Steve Davis – drums
- Dave Kane – double bass

Bourne/Davis/Kane have released one recording Lost Something, available from Edition Records. The Guardian gave the album four out of five stars and talked of the trio's "breathtaking virtuosity" exclaiming that"Lost Something is a set that should help confirm this trio's world-class status to a wider audience – it's modern music in the most meaningful sense." The Independent has hailed Melt as their pick of the album.

They have also performed with Paul Dunmall and recorded the album Moment To Moment.

Bourne has recorded a number of solo albums as well as other projects including Bilbao Syndrome. Kane has released Dave Kane's Rabbit Project. Steve Davis embarked on the studying of a PhD at Queen's University Belfast.
