= Limbs (album) =

Album by Keeley Forsyth

Studio album by Keeley Forsyth
- Released: 25 February 2022
- Genre: Experimental
- Label: The Leaf Label
- Producer: Keeley Forsyth; Ross Downes

Limbs is the second album by British musician Keeley Forsyth, released in February 2022. It was produced by Forsyth and Ross Downes. The album received critical acclaim upon its release.

== Track listing ==
1. "Fires" – 3:38
2. "Bring Me Water" – 3:55
3. "Limbs" – 2:56
4. "Land Animal" – 3:22
5. "Blindfolded" – 2:48
6. "Wash" – 3:24
7. "Silence" – 3:19
8. "I Stand Alone" – 2:57
