= Musicworks =

Canadian music magazine

- Editor: Jennie Punter
- Categories: music magazine
- Frequency: Tri-annual
- Publisher: Musicworks Society of Ontario
- Founder: Andrew Timar and John Oswald
- First issue: January 1978
- Country: Canada
- Based in: Toronto
- Website: www.musicworks.ca
- ISSN: 0225-686X

Musicworks is a Canadian avant-garde music magazine, launched in January 1978 by Andrew Timar (editor-in-chief) and John Oswald (design and production).

== History ==
The first four issues came as a supplement to Only Paper Today, a Toronto art magazine published by Victor Coleman. It was then published quarterly by Toronto's Music Gallery, with funding from the Canada Council, the Ontario Arts Council, private donations and paid advertisement. The journal's offices were located inside the Music Gallery on St. Patrick Street, Toronto. In 1981, John Oswald summed up the birth of the magazine in an editorial titled "The History of Musicworks":

Four years ago interested parties at the Music Gallery, an experimental music performance facility in Toronto, and Only Paper Today, an art publication, initiated a magazine of new musics as a supplement to OPT. This was accomplished with volunteered contributions of materials, editorial time, and print space in an existing magazine with existing distribution. The first four Musicworks issues were published in this way.

In 1982, composer Tina Pearson, then instructor at the Ontario College of Art and Design, became editor and launched the first companion cassette with issue #23, 1983. Pearson and Timar were both members of contemporary music collective New Music Co-op, along with Miguel Frasconi, Paul Hodge and Robert Stevenson.

== Contents ==
Musicworks claimed to be "the first attempt at a national periodical of new music [providing] information about experimental music in Canada". Until 1990, Musicworks emphasized post-Cagean music practices, performance art and graphic scores. Genres covered included avant-garde composition, ethnic music, acoustic ecology, special tunings and microtonality, improvisation, women's music, genre hybridation, etc. Typical composers interviewed or analysed in the 1978–1987 period were Raymond Murray Schafer, Udo Kasemets, Lou Harrison, Pauline Oliveros, Annea Lockwood, Philip Glass or John Cage, with a lengthy interview published issue #17, in 1981.

The cassettes issued with the magazine in the 1980s and 1990s make up about 48 hours of material, and have been the focus of renewed interest in recent years, culminating in an exhibit with listening stations.

With issue #48, published in 1990, the journal moved to a 68-page magazine format with a colour cover, and began to focus more on Canadian electroacoustic music and new technologies. The first companion CD appeared in 1992 with issue #52. Today, the magazine is published three times a year by Musicworks Society of Ontario, the official publisher since 2003. Public funding has been maintained throughout the years.

== Editors-in-chief ==
The following persons have been editors-in-chief of the magazine:

- 1978–1982: Andrew Timar
- 1982–1987: Tina Pearson
- 1987–2007: Gayle Young
- 2007–2009: David McCallum
- 2009–2013: Micheline Roi
- 2013–present: Jennie Punter
