= Keeley Forsyth =

British actress and musician

- Born: Oldham, England
- Years active: 1995–present
- Notable work: Debris
- Website: www.keeleyforsyth.com

Keeley Forsyth is an English actress and musician. She has released the albums Debris (2020), Limbs (2022) and The Hollow (2024).

== Acting ==
Forsyth's first acting role was as Nicky in the BBC children's television series The Biz in 1995, appearing alongside Paul Nicholls. She subsequently appeared in several television series, including Peak Practice, Where the Heart Is, Casualty, Heartbeat, The Bill, Dalziel and Pascoe, Holby City, The Line of Beauty, Luther, Waterloo Road, Criminal Justice, Coronation Street, Sons and Lovers, New Tricks (S8:E7, 2011). She has also performed for Real Circumstance Theatre Company.

In 2001, Forsyth appeared in an all-star Family Fortunes: Heartbeat vs Peak Practice edition. In 2015, she appeared as Terri Weedon in the BBC TV mini series The Casual Vacancy. In 2016, she appeared as Annette in the second series of Happy Valley.

== Music ==
In October 2019, Forsyth released the single "Debris" on The Leaf Label, followed by "Start Again", with accompanying video by Andrew Hulme, in January 2020. Her debut album of the same name, released on 17 January 2020, features "minimal arrangements" that feature Forsyth's "elemental voice and an outpouring of candid, haunting lyrics". The album also features fellow Leaf Label artist and pianist Matthew Bourne. Talking to The Line of Best Fit, she detailed the inception of the record and finding Bourne via the BBC's Late Junction: "I recorded all my stuff on the harmonium and gave it to him. I was meant to re-record my voice over his sounds, but he sent back what he heard on the harmonium – the chords, the keys, the silences, the breaths in and out – and it was just like, wow. I was stunned and I didn't really do anything with it for a little while [...] He's the only person who I know making music who lives close enough for me to make anything happen." The album was praised by Pitchfork, The Quietus and Loud and Quiet. It also made 2020's 'end of year lists' in The Quietus, Norman Records, The Line Of Best Fit, Loud And Quiet, Resident and Rough Trade.

Speaking to The Guardian in January 2020 Forsyth shared plans to develop a live performance in collaboration with film-makers Iain Forsyth and Jane Pollard.

She released Photograph in November 2020. The EP "suggests a broadening of Forsyth's musical horizons" and was featured in Rough Trade's Top 100 and Uncut's albums of the year.

In 2022 she released her second album, Limbs, to critical acclaim. In 2024 followed the album The Hollow.

== Filmography ==
=== Film ===
Year	Title	Role	Notes
2001	Fancy Dress	Wonderwoman	Short
2010	Edge	Deb	
2010	Wilting	Kate	Short
2012	Dawn	Maddison Fox	Short
2013	Almost Obsolete	Chris	Short
2014	Under	Kerry	Short
2014	Guardians of the Galaxy	Mottled Prisoner	
2016	The Limehouse Golem	Lizzie's Mother	
2016	Sweet Maddie Stone	Wendy	Short
2016	Vespers	Frankie	Short
2017	No Trace of Accelerator	A	
2018	The Devil Outside	Mother	
2018	Mary Anning	Mary Anning	Short
2019	X Anniversary	X	Short
2020	Pop	Sarah	Short
2020	From Scratch	Imogen	Short
2022	Neither Seen nor Heard	Dr. Canales	Short
2023	Club Zero	Ragna's Mother	
2023	Poor Things	Allison, Alfie's Maid	

=== Television ===
Year	Title	Role	Notes
1995	The Biz	Nicky	12 episodes
1996	Out of the Blue	Joanne Player	Episode: "Fake"
1997	Backup	Tania	3 episodes
1997	Peak Practice	Trish - Nurse	Episode: "Tough Love"
1998	Where the Heart Is	Jess Purnell	Episode: "The Healing Game"
1998	The Cops	Trish	Episode #1.1
1998–2001	Heartbeat	Sue Driscoll	10 episodes
1999–2006	The Bill	Amanda Cornwall; Beth Adamson	6 episodes
1999–2007	Holby City	Rachel Livingstone; Hazel Macklin; Linda Baylin	4 episodes
2000	Sunburn	Louise Denton	Episode #2.2
2000	Always and Everyone	WPC Mandie Sayle	3 episodes
2001	London's Burning	Naomi	2 episodes
2001	Judge John Deed	Carol Gainer	Episode: "Rough Justice"
2002	Dalziel and Pascoe	Det. Const. Carrie Harris	4 episodes
2003	Sons & Lovers	Annie Morel	TV movie
2004	If...	Molly Weaver	Episode: "If... We Could Stop the Violence"
2006	The Line of Beauty	Gemma	Episode: "The End of the Street"
2007	Blue Murder	Sgt Penny Harris	Episode: "Crisis Management"
2008	Emmerdale	DC Natalie Kemp	4 episodes
2008–2012	Doctors	Ali Finn; Amber Lawson	2 episodes
2009	Casualty	Rose Cooper; Kate Bryson	2 episodes
2011	Luther	Wilson	Episode #2.2
2011	New Tricks	Alice Fox	Episode: "The Gentleman Vanishes"
2011	Coronation Street	Shania	4 episodes
2014	Waterloo Road	Sammy Hughes	2 episodes
2015	The Casual Vacancy	Terri Weedon	Miniseries; 3 episodes
2015	Happy Valley	Annette	2 episodes
