= Least Like the Other =

Opera by Netia Jones and Brian Irvine

- Opera by Brian Irvine and Netia Jones
- Based on: The life of Rosemary Kennedy
- Premiere: 2019; Black Box Theatre, Galway

Least Like the Other, also billed as Least Like the Other, Searching For Rosemary Kennedy is an English-language opera in one act, created by Brian Irvine and Netia Jones. The opera tells the story of Rosemary Kennedy, eldest daughter of Joe and Rose Kennedy, younger sister of John F. Kennedy, using heavily redacted materials from the archives, and only recently pieced together by biographers and academics.

== Background ==
Rosemary Kennedy, the younger sister of US President John F. Kennedy, was left with learning difficulties after birth complications. In 1941, aged 23, she underwent a lobotomy, a decision made by her father. Immediately following the procedure, her condition worsened and she was institutionalized for the rest of her life.

The libretto of the opera was not written as such, but was assembled from contemporary material including intelligence tests, speeches, family interviews and books. Video projections are used during the opera, described by The Irish Times as 'compelling'. The title of the opera is taken from a question asked of Rosemary during the opera as part of an intelligence test. A projection is put before Rosemary, and a doctor asks: "Which of these is least like the other?" The projection shows three dogs and a cat.

== Performance history and cast ==
The opera requires only one singer, who plays the role of Rosemary as well as other small female roles. At the opera's premiere in 2019 at the Black Box Theatre, the singing role was performed by mezzo-soprano Naomi Louisa O'Connell, and in the 2023 Royal Opera House production by Amy Ní Fhearraigh. The Royal Opera House's production took place in the Linbury Studio Theatre in London. Apart from the single singer, the other roles are performed by actors who speak, but do not sing: actor/dancer Stephanie Dufresne, actor Ronan Leahy and voice-over artist Aoife Spillane-Hinks. Both performances were directed by Netia Jones and conducted by Fergus Sheil. Both performances were by the Irish National Opera.

Cast

- Singer: Naomi Louisa O'Connell (2019 & 2021) / Amy Ní Fhearraigh (2021 & 2023)
- Actor: Stephanie Dufresne
- Actor: Ronan Leahy
- Voice-over artist: Aoife Spillane-Hinks

Creative team

- Composer: Brian Irvine
- Director / designer / video designer: Netia Jones
- Conductor: Fergus Sheil
- Lighting designer: Sinéad Wallace
- Sound designer: David Sheppard
- Choreographer: Muirne Bloomer
- Assistant director: Aoife Spillane-Hinks
- Irish National Opera Orchestra

== Reception ==
=== 2019 production ===
In a five-star review, The Irish Times called the opera "deeply disturbing art", but also said that the production was evidence that opera in Ireland can be for everyone.

=== 2023 production ===
The Financial Times, in a review of the 2023 production, stated that the "actors struggled to get the text across", noting that "The surtitles are not a luxury. Without them, the opera would be sunk". However the same review called the Irish National Opera's production "first-class", and said that "Musical standards under conductor Fergus Sheil are high".

The Guardian praised singer Amy Ní Fhearraigh, saying that her voice "gleamed" in her performance as Rosemary.

Least Like The Other received an Ivor Novello Award nomination for Best Stage Work at The Ivors Classical Awards 2023.
