= Montauk Variations =

Studio album by Matthew Bourne
- Released: 6 February 2012
- Recorded: Dartington Hall
- Genre: Jazz, contemporary classical
- Length: 53:30
- Label: The Leaf Label

Matthew Bourne chronology
The Molde Concert (2004)	Montauk Variations (2012)	moogmemory (2016)

Montauk Variations is Perrier Award-winning British pianist/cellist Matthew Bourne's first studio album as a solo artist.

== Background ==
The album was inspired by Bourne's trip to Montauk, New York in August 2009 and was recorded at Dartington Hall in Devon. It is composed almost entirely of solo piano, with some cello overdubs. The album contains several personal dedications, including to musicians Keith Tippett and John Zorn. Bourne is vocal about his admiration for Zorn, with whom he has worked in New York, and the choice of recording location is the connection with Tippett, who also recorded an album at Dartington Hall.

== Critical reception ==
Professional ratings
Aggregate scores
Source	Rating
Metacritic	74/100
Review scores
Source	Rating
All About Jazz	4.5/5 stars
The Independent	4/5 stars
Drowned in Sound	8/10
The Skinny	4/5 stars

Montauk Variations received positive reviews across the UK press and was generally praised for its sense of serenity and stillness compared to Bourne's earlier work in "improvisational jazz [and] proto metal outfits". On the Metacritic website, which aggregates reviews from critics and assigns a normalised rating out of 100, Montauk Variations received a score of 74, based on 1 mixed and 5 positive reviews.

All About Jazz wrote, "Montauk Variations is about economy and lyricism. Bourne's use of sharper edges only serves to highlight the sheer beauty of their surrounding soft surfaces, making Montauk Variations an absolutely beautiful album of respite, restoration and renewal". The Skinny praised the album, saying, "Whether mellow and romantic (Juliet) or tumultuously erratic (Étude Psychotique), Bourne’s work is ceaselessly inventive and always absorbing". Drowned In Sound wrote that "whilst the album may be far from simple, it’s certainly the feeling of simplicity that makes this endearing, if not inspiring".

In The Independent, Phil Johnson dismissed the more frenetic moments on the record, saying "There's a bit of mad plinky-plonk, but otherwise Bourne uses space and consonance to create a series of meditations on mood and place".

== Track listing ==
All compositions by Bourne, apart from "Smile" by Charlie Chaplin.

1. "I. Air" - 4:16
2. "II. The Mystic" – 7:47
3. "III. Phantasie" – 2:38
4. "IV. Infinitude" – 4:58
5. "V. Etude Psychotique (For John Zorn)" – 1:07
6. "VI. Within" – 2:20
7. "VII. One For You, Keith" - 1:59
8. "VIII. Juliet" – 3:21
9. "IX. Senectitude" –1:07
10. "X. The Greenkeeper (for Neil Dyer)" – 3:09
11. "XI. Abrade" - 2:32
12. "XII. Here (In Memory of Phillip Butler-Francis) - 1:37
13. "XIII. Gone (In Memory of Phillip Butler-Francis) - 3:01
14. "XIV. Knell (In Memory of Phillip Butler-Francis) - 5:00
15. "XV. Cuppa Tea (for Paul Bolderson) - 5:39
16. "XVI. Unsung" - 1:10
17. "Smile" - 4:28

== Personnel ==
- Matthew Bourne - piano, cello
