= Grayfolded =

Live album by Grateful Dead
- Released: 1994, 1995
- Recorded: 1968–1993
- Genre: Psychedelic rock; jam band music; plunderphonics; sound collage
- Length: 109:53
- Label: Swell/Artifacts
- Producer: John Oswald

Grateful Dead chronology
Dick's Picks Volume 1 (1993)	Grayfolded (1994)	Dick's Picks Volume 2 (1995)

Grayfolded is a two-CD album produced by John Oswald featuring new edits and re-mixes of the Grateful Dead song "Dark Star". Oswald utilized plunderphonics (the usage of musical samples to construct new tracks, a technique Oswald pioneered) to edit fragments of over a hundred different performances of the song, recorded live between 1968 and 1993, to produce two new versions of the song each lasting about an hour.

The first disc of Grayfolded, titled Transitive Axis, was released in 1994, and the second disc, Mirror Ashes, was released in 1995, both on the Swell/Artifacts label. The two discs were released together in 1996. Grayfolded was re-released by Snapper Music in 1999, and by Fony in 2004. It was released as a three-disc vinyl LP on August 12, 2014, on the Important Records label.

Grayfolded is one of only three Grateful Dead albums that features the participation of every musician who was ever in the group, the others being the box sets So Many Roads (1965–1995) and 30 Trips Around the Sun (as well as the latter's 4-disc version).

== Production ==
In an interview in 1995 Oswald described how the project came about:

Phil Lesh called me up and talked me into doing it. At that point, I hadn't listened to any Grateful Dead music in about twenty years. I did think I was qualified, because I do think it's often a good idea to come into a project without a lot of prior knowledge and get kind of an alien's overview of what the music seems to be, and then put in your own two cents of what you think it should be. And I think that was the case for this. During the course of working on it, I went to a couple of Grateful Dead concerts, but other than that, I haven't listened to anything except these hundred versions of "Dark Star" that I found in the vaults.

On another occasion Oswald said that he had been asked by musician and journalist David Gans to produce something very short, he explained his response to this suggestion:

What interested me most about the Grateful Dead was their extended playing style. I wrote a counter-proposal to David saying, 'Well, I've been thinking about it and all I can hear is the opposite - something very long.'

== Critical reception ==
Professional ratings
Review scores
Source	Rating
Allmusic	4/5 stars

On AllMusic, Lindsay Planer said, "[John Oswald's] uncanny compositions—which he terms 'plunderphonics'—are sculpted by morphing and layering multiple incarnations of a song to make a thoroughly unique version.... While it may not be everyone's blend of surreal sonic psychedelics, Grayfolded is well executed and worthy of inclusion in any Deadhead collection."

== Track listing ==
Disc 1 – Transitive Axis

1. "Novature (Formless Nights Fall)" – 1:19
2. "Pouring Velvet" – 2:58
3. "In Revolving Ash Light" – 17:00
4. "Clouds Cast" – 7:13
5. "Through" – 8:52
6. "Fault Forces" – 6:19
7. "The Phil Zone" – 4:45
8. "La Estrella Oscura" – 9:33
9. "Recedes (While We Can)" – 1:56

Disc 2 – Mirror Ashes

0. "Fold" – 2:10 (hidden track)
1. "Transilience" – 0:07
2. "73rd Star Bridge Sonata" – 13:41
3. "Cease Tone Beam" – 12:45
4. "The Speed of Space" – 8:49
5. "Dark Matter Problem/Every Leaf Is Turning" – 6:42
6. "Foldback Time" – 1:33

== Personnel ==
- Jerry Garcia – lead guitar, vocals
- Bob Weir – rhythm guitar, vocals
- Phil Lesh – bass, vocals
- Bill Kreutzmann – drums
- Mickey Hart – drums
- Ron "Pigpen" McKernan – keyboards, vocals, harmonica, percussion
- Tom Constanten – keyboards
- Ned Lagin - keyboards, electronics
- Keith Godchaux – keyboards
- Donna Jean Godchaux – vocals
- Bruce Hornsby – piano, keyboards, vocals
- Brent Mydland – keyboards, vocals
- Vince Welnick – keyboards, vocals
- John Oswald – arranger
