= Dave Kane (musician) =

Northern Irish musician

- Born: Bangor, County Down, N.Ireland
- Occupations: Musician, composer

Dave Kane (born in Bangor, County Down, Northern Ireland) is a Double Bass player, composer and band leader.

== Beginnings ==
Kane purchased an electric bass guitar from a local catholic priest for £50 when he was 16 years old. He then began playing in local punk and alternative bands.

== Education ==
- North Down College with composer and bandleader Brian Irvine.
- Bretton Hall College of the University of Leeds where he immersed himself in the music of John Cage, Edgar Varese, Cecil Taylor, Barry Guy, John Coltrane, Iannis Xenakis, Charles Mingus, Frank Zappa and John Zorn.

== Career ==
Kane has played with British Jazz legends including; Evan Parker, Keith Tippett, Paul Dunmall, Elton Dean, Tony Levin, Mark Sanders, Alex Maguire, Paul Rogers and many others.

Currently based in Leeds, Kane is a founder member of L.I.M.A. (Leeds improvised music association) and musical director/ composer for the L.I.M.A orchestra. Other projects include: The internationally acclaimed Bourne/Davis/Kane; Dave Kane’s Rabbit Project; and a duo with Alex Bonney.

== Discography ==
=== Dave Kane's Rabbit Project ===
- The Eye Of The Duck (27 April June 2009) Edition Records EDN1012

=== Bourne/Davis/Kane ===
- Lost Something (August 2008) Edition Records EDN1003

=== Bourne/Davis/Kane with Paul Dunmall ===
- Moment To Moment

== Reviews of recorded work ==
- Review of "Dave Kane's Rabbit Project: The Eye of the Duck", The Jazzman, 30 April 2009.
- Review of "Dave Kane's Rabbit Project: The Eye of the Duck", The Guardian, 29 May 2009.
- Review of "Dave Kane's Rabbit Project: The Eye of the Duck", The Vortex Jazz Club 2009.
- Review of "Lost Something", The Independent, 24 August 2008.
- Review of "Lost Something", The Guardian, 12 September 2008.
