= Nobuo Kubota =

Canadian artist (1932–2025)

- Born: June 27, 1932; Vancouver, British Columbia, Canada
- Died: September 30, 2025 (aged 93); Toronto, Ontario, Canada
- Education: University of Toronto
- Known for: Multimedia artist

Nobuo Kubota RCA (June 27, 1932 – September 30, 2025) was a Canadian multimedia artist.

== Life ==
Kubota grew up with a strong Japanese focus in his home and with an early interest in the writings by Jack Kerouac and D. T. Suzuki. These two factors partially explain his later attraction to Zen Buddhism. During World War II, he was incarcerated with his family in an internment camp for Japanese Canadians.

Kubota had a degree in architecture from the University of Toronto and practiced architecture for ten years. As an architect, his interest in Zen Buddhism was reinforced by an attraction to Japanese architecture, which was to have an influence on him later as a sculptor. He became a sculptor in 1969, showed regularly with the Isaacs Gallery group in Toronto, and is said to have deliberately adopted a Japanese 'look' in his work whereby he alluded to Japanese aesthetics and art.

When Nobuo Kubota was awarded a Canada Council grant in 1970 he was able to spend a year in Japan. He went ostensibly to study Japanese art but found his way to Kyoto where he was invited to live with a Zen master, Nanrei Sohatsu Kobori, in his temple in the famous Daitokuji complex. Kubota died in Toronto from a subdural hematoma on September 30, 2025, at the age of 93.

== Work ==
His work often combined sound, music, installation and film, a practice that he labeled 'intermedia'. A member of the Artists Jazz Band from the late 1960s on (he played alto sax) and the CCMC (Canadian Creative Music Collective) (1974–1991), and as one of the founding members of the Music Gallery, he was known for his extended vocal techniques and sound poetry which can be watched and listened to on You Tube. In 1999, the Kelowna At Gallery held a retrospective of his work titled Nobuo Kubota: The Exploration of Possibility. A second exhibition titled Nobuo Kubota: Hokusai Revisited was held at Kelowna in 2010. His interests involved the development of a calligraphic style of notation for the depiction of sound which he called 'Sonic Calligraphy'. He published two books, Phonic Slices and Deep Text (both 2001) with Coach House Books.

His work is held in numerous collections including the National Gallery of Canada. He was made a member of the Royal Canadian Academy of Arts.

He received the Allied Arts Award from the Royal Architectural Institute of Canada. In 2000, he received the Victor Martyn Lynch-Staunton Award from the Canada Council. He received the Governor General's award for the arts in 2009. He also received a Doctor of Fine Arts Honoris Causa from the Ontario College of Art and Design (2011).

From 1970 to 1998, he taught at OCAD University.
