= John Oswald (composer) =

Canadian composer

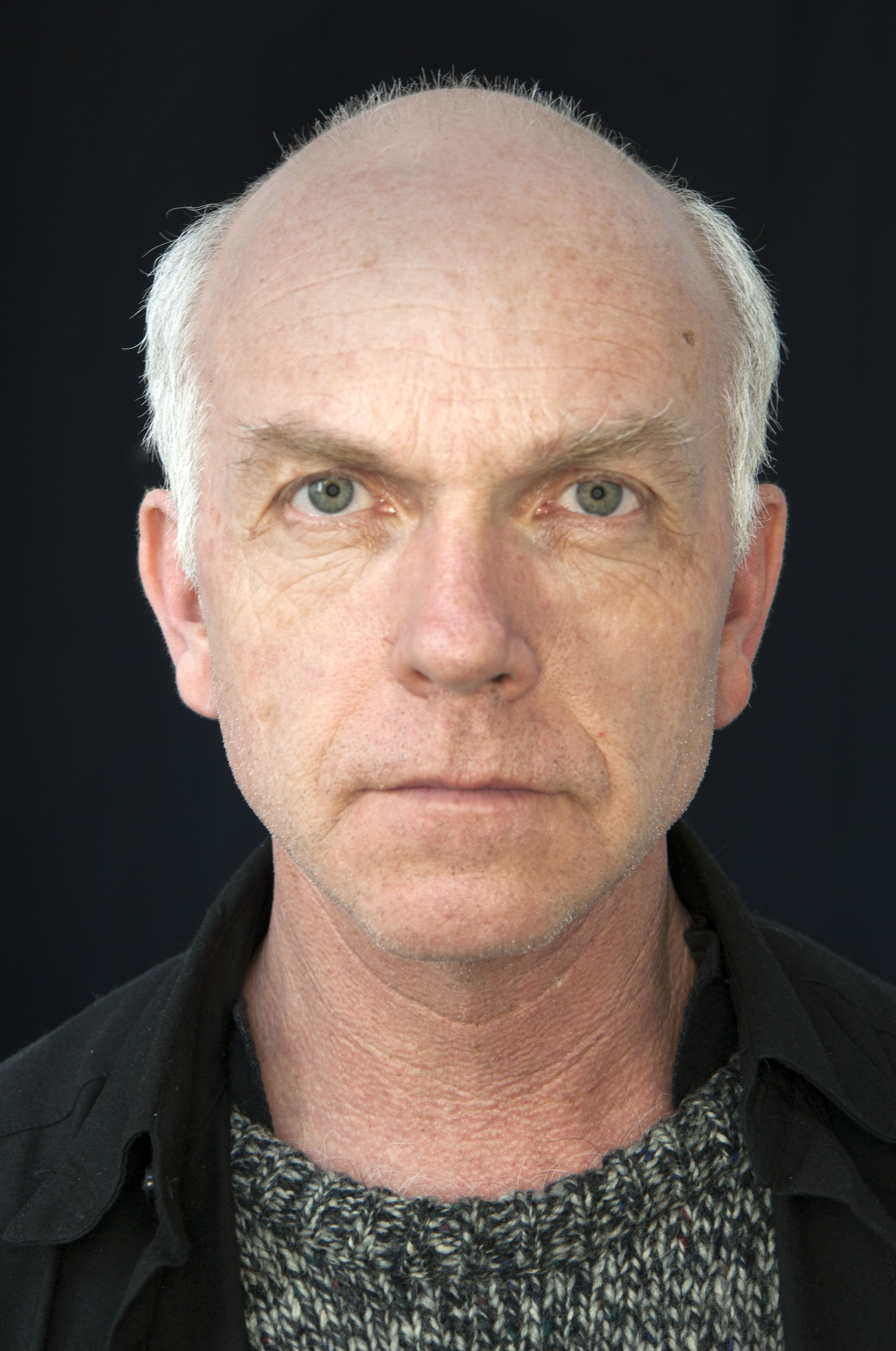
John Oswald self-portrait Toronto 2017

John Oswald (born May 30, 1953 in Kitchener, Ontario) is a Canadian composer, saxophonist, media artist and dancer. He is best known for coining the term "plunderphonics", the practice of making new music out of previously existing recordings.

== Early life ==
Oswald was introduced to sampling from a young age having been gifted a reel-to-reel player from his parents at age 9. He then attended Simon Fraser University in the 1970s, becoming part of World Soundscape Project while on campus. It was there that Oswald became familiar with recorded sounds from different environments and applying them to new work created.

== Philosophy ==
Oswald coined the term "plunderphonics" to describe his craft in a paper called "Plunderphonics, or Audio Piracy as a Compositional Prerogative" which he presented at the Wired Society Electro-Acoustic Conference in Toronto in 1985. Inspired by William S. Burroughs' cut-up technique, Oswald had been devising plunderphonic-style compositions since the late 1960s. In an interview with Norman Igma following the release of the Plunderphonics EP in 1988, he described the concept as follows:

A plunderphone is a recognizable sonic quote, using the actual sound of something familiar which has already been recorded. Whistling a bar of "Density 21.5" is a traditional musical quote. Taking Madonna singing "Like a Virgin" and rerecording it backwards or slower is plunderphonics, as long as you can reasonably recognize the source. The plundering has to be blatant though. There's a lot of samplepocketing, parroting, plagiarism and tune thievery going on these days which is not what we're doing.

Plunderphonics is related to but distinct from sampling used in genres such as hip-hop.

== Works ==
His 1975 track "Power" married frenetic Led Zeppelin guitars to the impassioned exhortations of a Southern US evangelist years before hip-hop discovered the potency of the same (and related) ingredients. Similarly, his 1990 track "Vane", which pitted two different versions of the song "You're So Vain" (the Carly Simon original and a cover by Faster Pussycat) against each other, was a blueprint for the contemporary pop subgenre, 'glitch pop' or 'mashup'.

In 1980, Oswald founded the Mystery Tapes Laboratory, which created unnamed, unattributed works on cassette, described on the plunderphonics website as "little boxes of sonifericity specifically formulated for the curious listener. Available in your choice of aural flavors: subliminal, blasted, excerpted, repeatpeateatattttttedly [sic], these cinemaphonically-concocted aggregates of très different but exquisitely manifest, unprecedentedly varied festerings of audio quality fine magnetic cassette tapes are the best of whatever you've been listening for". Oswald continues to be Director of Research at Mystery Tapes.

His greatest source of controversy was the 1988 release of the Plunderphonics EP, which he distributed to the press and to radio stations. It contained four plundered tracks: "Don't" by Elvis Presley which included piano accompaniment by Bob Wiseman, "Pocket" by Count Basie, a version of Dolly Parton singing "The Great Pretender" in which "she gets to sing a duet with himself [sic]", and "Spring", a version of Igor Stravinsky's The Rite of Spring. In 1989, Oswald released an expanded version of the Plunderphonics album on compact disc containing twenty-five tracks, each using material from a different artist. In 1990, notice was given to Oswald by the Canadian Recording Industry Association on behalf of several of their clients (notably Michael Jackson, whose song "Bad" had been cut up, layered, and rearranged as "Dab") that all undistributed copies of Plunderphonics be destroyed under threat of legal action.

"I wasn't selling the disc in the stores, so I let listeners tape it off the radio for free," explains Oswald, who paid for the production and manufacture of the CD out of his own pocket. He receives no royalties or financial compensation for airplay. Brian Robertson, president of CRIA says, "What this demonstrates is the vulnerability of the recording industry to new technology...All we see is just another example of theft."

Oswald received notice from CRIA's lawyers demanding that he cease distributing Plunderphonic as of Xmas eve '89. "They insisted I quit playing Santa Claus," Oswald observes.

In 1993 Oswald released Plexure, a composition that attempted to microsample the history of CD music up to that point (1982–1992) in a 20-minute collage of bewildering complexity. The ambition of this piece would later be recalled by the British bootlegger Osymyso, whose "Intro-Inspection" emulates the pop-junkie feel of Plexure.

From 1993 to 1996, Oswald worked on and released Grayfolded, a 2-Disc set commissioned by the Grateful Dead consisting of pieces created from over 100 performances of the song "Dark Star". Oswald initially created and released disc 1, "Transitive Axis", which contains a 59 minute 59 second work in 9 movements. Feeling that there was more territory to explore, Oswald worked on disc 2, Mirror Ashes, which is a composition in "6*" movements. Once both discs were complete they were packaged together with extensive liner notes and a "visual time map" of the sources used in the compositions. Grayfolded was selected the #1 international recording of the decade by the Toronto Sun.

In addition to his extensive work in "plunderphonics", Oswald is also involved with acoustic music, as a composer and improviser. His compositions for orchestra often do include electronic elements, such as Concerto for Wired Conductor and Orchestra (?), but has also composed for acoustic ensembles, such as Acupuncture (1991). Oswald improvises with the saxophone, and is a member of free improvisation group CCMC.

=== Other projects ===
Oswald is also actively involved in dance as a composer for dance works, as a collaborator with choreographers, and as an active Contact Improviser.

Oswald founded the record label 'Fony', which produced the retrospective box set 69 plunderphonics 96 (a.k.a. Plunderphonics 69/96) and reissued Grayfolded. The label also rereleased Plexure and released Aparanthesi, a work which uses the single note A in an experiment with timbre, dynamics, and layering, on CD in 2003.

Since 2000 Oswald has been as active in exhibiting his visual art as in continuing his musical activities.

=== Legacy ===
In 2004, Oswald was one of six artists to win the annual Governor General's Awards in Visual and Media Arts, as awarded by the Canada Council for the Arts, for lifetime achievement.

== Discography ==
- Burrows (1974–75)
- Power (1975)
- Improvised (1978)
- Moose and Salmon (Music Gallery, 1979)
- Alto Sax (Metalanguage, 1981)
- Plunderphonics EP (1988)
- Plunderphonic CD (1989)
- Electrax (1991)
- Discophere (1991)
- Rubiyat Plunderphonics (1991) - promo-CD made from Elektra Records' Rubáiyát: Elektra's 40th Anniversary collection
- Acoustics (1993) - with Henry Kaiser, Jim O'Rourke, and Mari Kimura
- Plexure (1993)
- Grayfolded (1994) - a two CD mix of over 100 versions of the Grateful Dead song "Dark Star"
- Parcours scénographique (1997)
- aCCoMpliCes with CCMC (Victo, VICTO 063, 1998)
- 69plunderphonics96 (a.k.a. Plunderphonics 69/96) (Box set) (2000)
- Complicité (2001) - with Paul Plimley, Marilyn Crispell and Cecil Taylor
- Bloor (2001) - with David Prentice and Dominic Duval
- Dearness (2002) - with Anne Bourne and Fred Frith
- Aparanthesi (empreintes DIGITALes, IMED 0368, 2003)
- Arc d'apparition (DVD) and Whisperfield (CD) (2004)
- Number Nine with Michael Keith and Roger Turner (Emanem 4129, 2005)

== List of works ==
- Acupuncture (1991), for clarinet, trumpet, piano, 2 percussion and double bass
- Aparanthesi (2003)
- Ariature (from The Idea of This) (1999), for chamber orchestra and tape or tenor
- b9 (2011), for chamber ensemble
- b9 (2012), for the nine symphonies of Beethoven
- Bell Speeds (1983, 90)
- Blur (Bolton Chili Overdire); 1 Moment, 2 Wow, 3 Nest
- Burrows (1974–75)
- Compact (R.E.M.T.V. Hammercamp); 1 Phase, 2 Snap
- Cyfer (Depeche Mould)
- from Burrows: silence to say (1974)
- Fee Fie Foe Fum (2017)
- Grayfolded (1995)
- Homonymy (1998), for flute, oboe, clarinet, bassoon, horn, trombone, percussion, violin, cello, doublebass and video tape
- Mad Mod (Jello Bellafonte)
- Manifold (Bing Stingspreen); 1 Philosophy, 2 Phase
- Massive (Ozzie Osmond); 1 Hazzard, 2 Warning, 3 Treacherous
- Ohmigone (2001)
- Open (Bo No Ma); 1 Suck, 2 Rip
- Ridge (2001)
- Skindling Shadés (1987)
- "Spectre" (1990), on Short Stories
- Temperature (Beastie Shop Beach); 1 Tempus Amoré (Hyper Love Time), 2 Tempo Pact
- Un paysage (Ouverture) (1996)
- Urge (Marianne Faith No Morrisey); 1 Slow, 2 Slice, 3 Blink
- Velocity (Aretha Vanilli); 1 Tremendous, 2 Tremulous
- Worse (Anthrax Squeeze Factory)
- Zoom (Sinead O'Connick Jr); 1 Alone, 2 Gogh

== See also ==
- Anti-copyright
- Cut-up technique
