= Franck Vigroux =

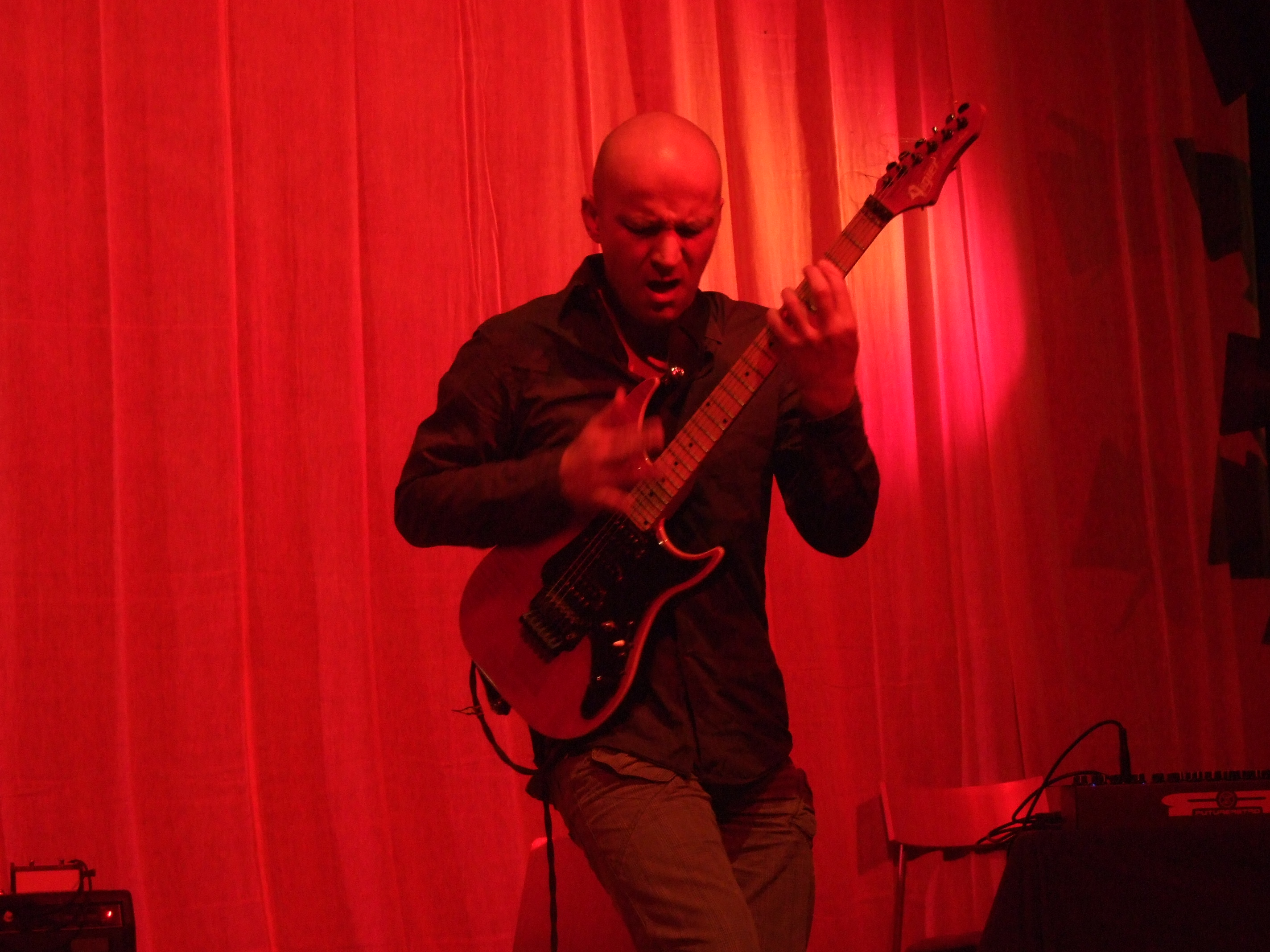
- Franck Vigroux, a French avant garde guitarist, in Stirling (Scotland), May 2008

Background information
- Genres: Electroacoustic, free improvisation
- Occupations: musician, composer
- Label: D'Autres Cordes (DAC)
- Website: www.franckvigroux.com

Franck Vigroux is a French musician, composer and media artist.

== Background ==
Vigroux's artistic approach integrates new media and performing arts. He is a multifaceted artist whose music works range from electro-acoustic and experimental electronic music to modern composition, improvisation, radio works, avant rock, and beyond. Primarily known as a guitar player, he also manipulates electronics, modular synths and has composed works for contemporary classical ensembles. He is equally prolific as a solo artist and as a collaborator, he has worked with musicians such as Mika Vainio, Reinhold Friedl (Zeitkratzer), Elliott Sharp, Joey Baron, and Zeena Parkins, and regularly collaborates with media artists Antoine Schmitt and Kurt d'Haeseleer. Vigroux founded DAC records in 2002, and the label has released dozens of recordings by himself as well as similarly unclassifiable experimental artists such as Hélène Breschand, Samuel Sighicelli, Elliott Sharp and Bruno Chevillon. He also established D'Autres Cordes as a performing arts company in 2008, and has presented works by Philippe Malone, Marc Ducret, and others. Vigroux made his solo debut with the Lilas trilogy beginning in 2003, and subsequent efforts such as Récolte (2009) and We (Nous Autres) increasingly incorporated elements of noise and industrial techno. Additionally, he collaborated with Matthew Bourne on a 2015 Kraftwerk tribute titled Radioland: Radio-Activity Revisited.

In 2007, Vigroux worked with Japanese spoken word artist Kenji Siratori on a limited CD-R titled Pituitary Desert; that same year also saw the release of Hums 2 Terre, a live collaboration with Elliott Sharp for Radio France's label Signature. Vigroux's noisy, glitchy solo album Récolte appeared in 2009, and he also collaborated with Matthew Bourne that year, resulting in the full-length Call Me Madame (Good News from Wonderland). Vigroux released a collaborative 12" EP with Jean-François Oliver on the Trig label in 2010. Other releases that year included the electronic solo album Camera Police; Broken Circles Live, an orchestral work performed by Ars Nova Ensemble Instrumental; and Venice, Dal Vivo, a recording of a 2008 live (in Venice, Italy) collaboration with Joey Baron, Bruno Chevillon, and Elliott Sharp.

In 2012, Vigroux released Transistor, a collaboration with Michigan-based experimental musician Ben Miller. He also issued another solo album, We (Nous Autres). A second album with Miller, The Din of Eon, appeared in 2013. The following year saw the release of Tobel, Vigroux's collaboration with Reinhold Friedl of contemporary ensemble Zeitkratzer. He also released a solo guitar album titled Ciment, as well as Centaure, a noisy industrial techno-leaning 12" EP on Shapednoise's Cosmo Rhythmatic label. Vigroux returned to the label in 2015 for the release of Peau froide, léger soleil, a collaboration with kindred spirit Mika Vainio. He also recorded another collaboration with Bourne, this time a tribute to Kraftwerk's Radio-Aktivität. Radioland: Radio-Activity Revisited appeared at the end of 2015 on Leaf. 2016 saw the release of solo efforts Rapport Sur le Désordre and Camera as well as Tobel II with Freidl. Following his solo LP Barricades (2017), Vigroux released Ignis in 2018, a posthumous collaboration with Vainio, who died in 2017. Two solo EPs, Désastres and Théorème, appeared in early 2019 and one LP Totem for Aesthetical.

== Discography ==
- 2005: Triste Lilas with Marc Ducret, Hélène Breschand, Bruno Chevillon, Michel Blanc
- 2004: Cos la machina as Push the Triangle with Médéric Collignon, Stéphane Payen, Michel Blanc
- 2006: Hums de terre with Elliott Sharp (Signature Radio France)
- 2007: Pituitary Desert with Kenji Siratori
- 2007: Data 451 as Supersonic Riverside Blues (DAC Records)
- 2008: Me Madam with Matthew Bourne (DAC Records)
- 2009: Recolte (DAC Records)
- 2010: Camera Police (DAC Records)
- 2010: Venice dal Vivo with Joey Baron, Bruno Chevillon, Elliott Sharp
- 2010: Broken Circles Live with l'ensemble Ars Nova, Marc Ducret, Matthew Bourne
- 2010: Archipel électronique, compilation (D'Autres Cordes)
- 2010: Live with Rodolphe Loubatière (D'Autres Cordes)
- 2012: We, Nous autres (D'Autres Cordes)
- 2012: Transistor with Ben Miller (DAC Records)
- 2013: The Din of Eons as Transistor (DAC Records)
- 2014: Ciment (DAC Records)
- 2014: Centaure (Cosmo Rhythmatic)
- 2015: Peau froide, léger soleil with Mika Vainio (Cosmo Rhythmatic)
- 2016: Rapport sur le désordre (DAC Records)
- 2016: Tobel 2 with Reinhold Friedl (Monotype Rec)
- 2017: Barricades (Erototox)
- 2018: Ignis with Mika Vainio (Cosmo Rhythmatic)
- 2018: Désastres EP (Jezgro)
- 2019: Théorème EP (DAC Records)
- 2019: Totem (Aesthetical)
- 2020: Ballades sur lac gelé (Raster)
- 2022: Atotal (Aesthetical)
