= Antoine Schmitt =

French visual artist and programmer (born 1961)

- Born: 1961 (age 64–65); Strasbourg, France
- Other name: Georges Victor
- Education: Télécom Paris (1984)
- Occupations: Visual artist, programmer
- Style: Generative art, digital art
- Website: antoineschmitt.com

Antoine Schmitt (born 1961 in Strasbourg) is a French visual artist and programming engineer who revolves in the fields of digital art and digital design, especially in the field of the connected objects.

== Biography ==
=== Programmer ===
Antoine Schmitt taught himself programming at the age of sixteen on the family computer and was fascinated by its metaphysical and experimental aspects. He obtained his civil engineering degree from Télécom Paris in 1984.

He was first a programmer and project manager in the service company Act Informatique between 1985 and 1991, and specialized in the field of artificial intelligence and human-machine interactions. He developed tools, carried out missions and conducted research in the fields of expert systems, artificial neural networks, geographic information systems, and computer vision. He collaborated technically with Jacques Serrano on his work Cigale (1989). From 1991 to 1994, he worked as a programmer for the company NeXT, founded by Steve Jobs, specializing in human-machine interfaces for development software (Project Builder) and communication systems (Mail, distributed persistent messaging systems). He participated in the design and programming of the OPENSTEP environment and created the NSNotificationQueue class, which is still an integral part of Mac OS X to this day.

In 1997, Schmitt assisted filmmaker Chris Marker in testing his CD-ROM Immemory. Between 1996 and 2003, he developed and distributed specialized software bricks (plugins), in particular asFFT Xtra for Adobe Director. Between 2001 and 2006, he was a behavioral designer for domestic robotics products for the company violet (Dal, Dal:Dal, Nabaztag).

Since 1995, he has been an independent programmer in the fields of multimedia, human-machine interactions and connected objects, and works with many specialized companies (Hyptique, Virtools, BBC, Incandescence, violet, enero, Kingfisher, Intuis, etc...).

=== Artist ===
In 1995, Schmitt began an artistic activity using "programming as the heart of digital aesthetics". He articulates his work around the notion of artificial being which allows him to approach the human being and the nature of reality in a new way. A pioneer of generative art, his work is internationally recognized by numerous awards, residencies, exhibitions and concerts. Using programming as an artistic material, he collaborates with many artists from other fields of art (Franck Vigroux, Atau Tanaka, Vincent Epplay, Jean-Jacques Birgé, Delphine Doukhan, K.Danse, Patrice Belin, Don Nino, Cubenx, Alberto Sorbelli, Matthew Bourne, Hortense Gauthier, etc.).

In 1998, he published a manifesto of the work of art on computer which positions the computer in itself as a new medium of artistic creation.

In 1995, Schmitt created puppetsprite 1, the first artistic CD-ROM, with Alberto Sorbelli and participated as an author and as technical director of the CD-ROM "Just From Cyntha" by Alberto Sorbelli. In 1999, he co-authored with Vincent Epplay the "infinite CD for unlimited music", the first CD-ROM of generative music. In 2019, he designed deep hormone software for the work CliMax with Hortense Gauthier. Since 2011, he has been the author with the musician Franck Vigroux of several audiovisual shows presented around the world (Tempest, Chronostasis, Cascades, ATOTAL, Nacht, Videoscope). In 2021, he created a series of generative and semi-autonomous NFTs.

Schmitt develops several software and collaborative platforms in the field of art and social life. In 1997, under the pseudonym Georges Victor, he launched olalaParis, the first distribution list for announcements of artistic events in France. In 2000, he founded the portal gratin.org, Research Group in Art and Interactive and/or Digital Technologies, a reference in programmed art. In 2004, he launched the sonicobject label with Adrian Johnson, a label of creative mobile phone ringtones, bringing together 16 sound artists and more than 200 ringtones, now available under a Creative Commons license. In 2020, during the lockdown, he launched the Manif.app platform (renamed weprotest.xyz in 2024) for anonymous online demonstrations on a shared map.

His work Vexation 1 received an honorary mention at the transmediale festival in 2001. In 2007, his work Still Living received second prize at the same transmediale festival. In 2009, his work Nabazmob, created with Jean-Jacques Birgé, received second prize at the Ars Electronica festival.

Schmitt has been represented in Paris by the Galerie Charlot since 2010, and in Berlin by the DAM Projects gallery since 2023.

== Awards ==
- Festival medi@terra (Athens, first prize, 1999)
- Möbius Prize (Paris, nominated, 1999)
- Festival Interférences (Belfort, first prize, 2000)
- Festival transmediale (Berlin, honorary mention 2001)
- Vida 5.0 (Madrid, honorary mention, 2002)
- Festival International UNESCO de Video-Dance (Paris, first prize, 2002)
- Festival machinista (Russie, nominated, 2003)
- Festival CYNETart (Dresden, honorary mention, 2004)
- Festival transmediale (Berlin, second prize, 2007)
- Festival Ars Electronica (Linz, second prize, 2009)
- Digital Turku (Turku, FI, honorary mention, 2011)
- New Technological Art Award (Bruxelles, nominated, 2012)
- Voeux de l’Internet (Issy-les-Mx, FR, E-Toile d’Or category Art, 2012)
- Share Festival (Torino, special mention, 2012)
- Victor Vasarely (Aix-en-Provence, finalist, 2013)
- Stuttgarder Filmwinter Festival (Stuttgard, nominated, 2014)
- Bains Numériques Enghien les Bains (Enghien, nominated, 2014)
- Screengrab International festival (Townsville, Australia, nominated, 2014)
- Kasseler DokFest (Kassel, nominated, 2014)
- Media Architecture Biennale 16 (Sidney, Australia, nominated, 2016)
- Stuttgart Filmwinter (Stuttgart, nominated, 2018)

== Selective bibliography ==
- Jim Andrews (2003). "Antoine Schmitt". turbulence.org. Archived from the original on 23 May 2008.
- Dominique Moulon (2006). "L'art programmé selon Antoine Schmitt" (PDF). Images Magazine.
- Fred Forest (2008). "Net.art et art génératif". Art et Internet. Cercle d’art. pp. 88–90. ISBN 9782702208649.
- Hervé Zénouda (2008). "Chapitre 5 : Antoine Schmitt". Les images et les sons dans les hypermédias artistiques contemporains. Éditions L'Harmattan. ISBN 9782296061071.
- Caroline Châtelet (2011). "Antoine Schmitt, démiurge de l'art" (PDF). Novo.
- Dominique Moulon (2011). Art contemporain et nouveaux médias (in French). nouvelles éditions Scala. ISBN 978-2359880380.
- Michel Durampart; Françoise Bernard; Hervé Zénouda; Franck Renucci (11 July 2013). "Esthétique de la cause — Esthétique de la caresse, Une exposition d'Antoine Schmitt". Savoirs en action: Culture et réseaux méditerranéens (CNRS Alpha ed.). CNRS éditions. ISBN 9782271071927.
- Anne Laforet (2013). "Antoine Schmitt, still living H, I, J. & Entretien avec Antoine Schmitt". Conservation de l'art numérique : théorie et pratique. ZKM. pp. 329–346. ISBN 978-3-7091-1467-4.
- Andreas Broekmann (2016). "Antoine Schmitt Vexation 1". Machine Art in the twentieth century. Leonardo, MIT Press. pp. 145–146. ISBN 978-0-262-03506-4.
- Aude de Bourbon-Parme (October 2018). "Pourquoi ça bouge et comment" (PDF). Transfuge magazine.
- J. Sage Elwell (2020). "Antoine Schmitt, Christ Mourant (2006)". Religion and the Digital Arts. Brill. ISBN 9789004447431.
- "Faire mouvement, La cinétique à l'épreuve de l'œuvre d'Antoine Schmitt". Mouvement : Cinétisme et modèles dynamiques dans la musique et les arts plastiques. Delatour France. 30 November 2021. pp. 329–346. ISBN 9782752104380.
- Schmitt, Antoine (2022). "Du carré au pixel, Entretien avec Antoine Schmitt" (PDF) (Interview). Vol. 2, no. 9. Interviewed by Ada Ackerman. K. Revue trans-européenne de philosophie et arts. pp. 114–121. ISSN 2609-2484.
