= Wiesław Cupała =

Polish mathematician

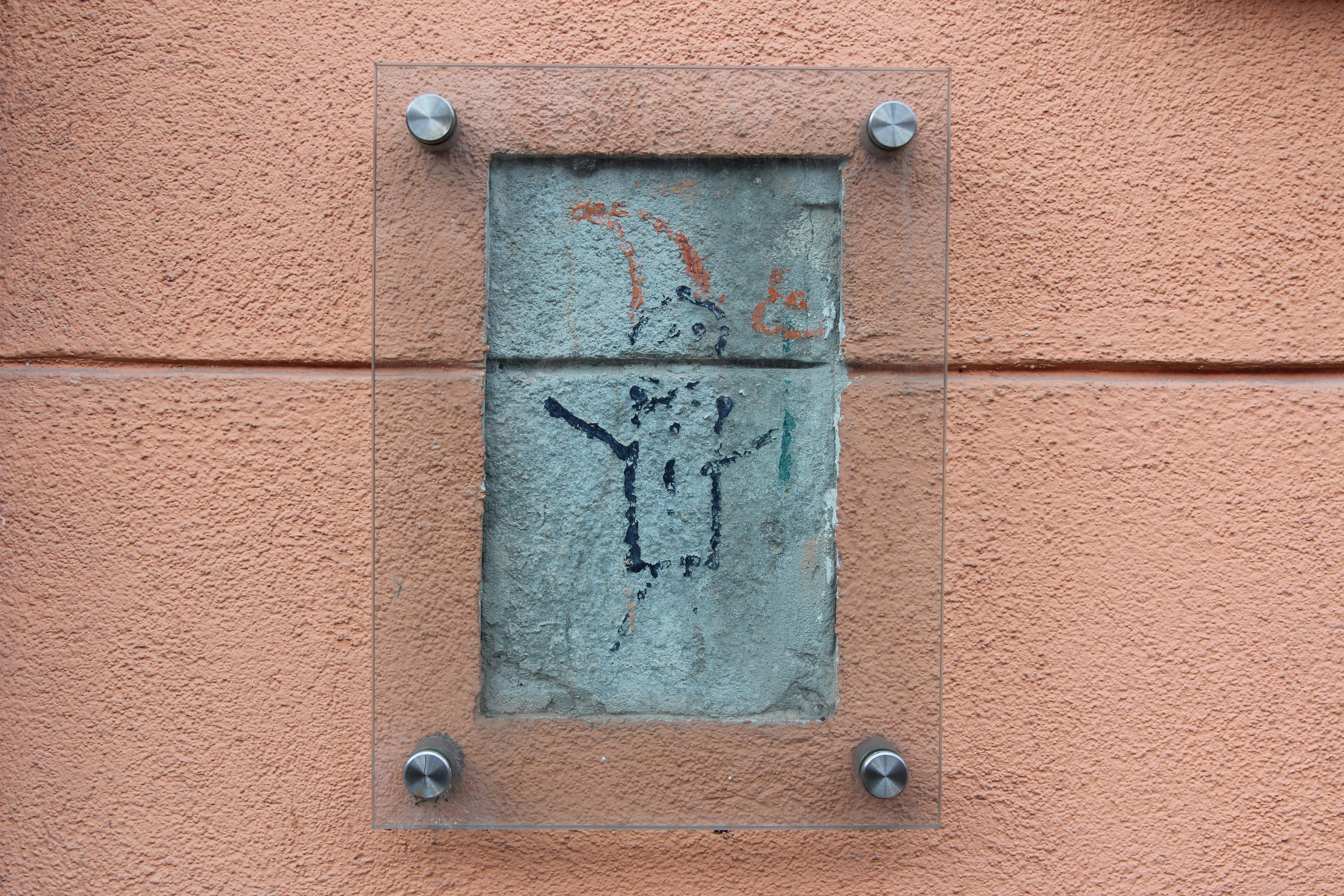
- Orange Alternative dwarf in Wrocław Smoluchowskiego 22
- Born: 27 August 1956 (age 69); Ostrów Wielkopolski, Poland
- Occupation: Mathematician

Wiesław Cupała (aliases: "Rotmistrz (Rittmeister)"; born 27 August 1956) is a Polish artist, writer, mathematician, editor of the website of the Wolność i Pokój (Freedom and Peace) movement, and one of the leaders of the Orange Alternative.

== Career ==
In 1981, Cupała finished the Faculty of Mathematics, Physics and Chemistry of the University of Wrocław. In 1985, he defended his thesis at the Polish Academy of Sciences in Wrocław. From 1987 until 1994, he worked there as a lecturer. From 1994 until 2003, he worked as a lecturer at the Faculty of Mathematics, Informatics and Econometry of the University of Zielona Góra. From 2003 until 2007, he was a senior lecturer at the Faculty of Fundamental Problems of Technology of the Wrocław University of Science and Technology. From 2008 until 2010, he worked as a recruiter at Power Media company.

== Political activity ==
In the years 1976–1980, Cupała cooperated with publishing houses of the Workers' Defence Committee and the Committee for Social Self-Defense KOR. He was also the co-founder of Studencki Komitet Solidarności we Wrocławiu (Student Self-Defense Committee in Wrocław). In November and December 1981, he was the co-founder, editor, author and printer of the magazine Na strajku ("On strike"). During martial law in Poland, he was briefly interned from 18 February to 15 March 1982 in an internment camp in Nysa. From 1982 until 1989, he worked for the publishing houses of Solidarność Walcząca (Fighting Solidarity) as printer and distributor. From 1983 until 1987, he used his flat to host Radio Solidarity's radio programs. A transmitter was also located in his flat during the period. From 1982 until 1988, he worked as typesetter for Biuletyn Dolnośląski (Lower Silesian Bulletin). From 1990 until 1991, he was a member of Partia Wolności (Freedom Party). For his activity, Cupała was awarded the Cross of Fighting Solidarity (Krzyż Solidarności Walczącej}.

== Orange Alternative ==
In 1981, Cupała was one of the initiators and members of the happening movement Orange Alternative. He was the editor of Orange Alternative magazine and together with Major Waldemar Fydrych created the first two dwarves, with one painted on a transformer in the Sępolno district and the other on an apartment building in Biskupin. He also created and set up happenings. During the 1989 Polish legislative election, Cupała was Fydrych’s head of staff, who ran as an independent candidate.
