= Dwarf =

Dwarf, dwarfs or dwarves may refer to:

== Common uses ==
- Dwarf (folklore), a supernatural being from Germanic folklore
- Dwarf, a human or animal with dwarfism

== Arts, entertainment, and media ==
=== Fictional entities ===
- Dwarf (Dungeons & Dragons), a short humanoid race
- Dwarf (Middle-earth), a humanoid race in J. R. R. Tolkien's literature
- Dwarf (Warhammer), a humanoid race
- Dwarfs (Discworld), a race of characters
- Dwarves (Warcraft), a short, strong race
- Dwarves (Marvel Comics)
- Seven Dwarfs

=== Literature ===
- The Dwarf (Cho novel), a 1978 novel by Cho Se-hui
- The Dwarf (Lagerkvist novel), a 1944 novel by Pär Lagerkvist

=== Other arts, entertainment, and media ===
- Dwarfs?! (video game)
- Dwarves (band), American punk band
- Killer Dwarfs, Canadian heavy metal band
- Wrocław's dwarfs, small sculptures in Wrocław, Poland
- Dwarves (Mayfair Games), a supplement for role-playing games

== Biology ==
- Phyletic dwarfism, an average decrease in size of animals
  - Insular dwarfism, a evolutionary condition caused by genetic and environmental factors (e.g. no / little predators and smaller geography)

== Astronomy ==
- Dwarf galaxy
- Dwarf planet
- Dwarf star

== Other uses ==
- Dwarf, Kentucky
- DWARF, a debugging data format
- PYGMIES + DWARFS arguments

== See also ==
- Dwarven language (disambiguation)
- (including many cross-references from common names of plants or animals)
