= Zwerg =

Zwerg is the German and Luxembourgish word for dwarf.

It may also refer to:

== Music ==
- Der Zwerg, one-act opera composed by Alexander von Zemlinsky
- "Der Zwerg," lied composed by Franz Schubert

== People ==
- James Zwerg, American minister and civil rights activist
