= Dwarven script =

Dwarven or Dwarvish script may refer to:

- Cirth, a runic-like script used by the Dwarves in J. R. R. Tolkien's Middle-earth
- Dethek, a runic-like script used to write the Dwarvish language and some others in Dungeons & Dragons
- Klinkarhun, a runic-like script used to write the Dwarvish language in Warhammer

== See also ==
- Dwarven language
