= Orange Alternative =

Polish anti-communist underground movement, started in Wrocław

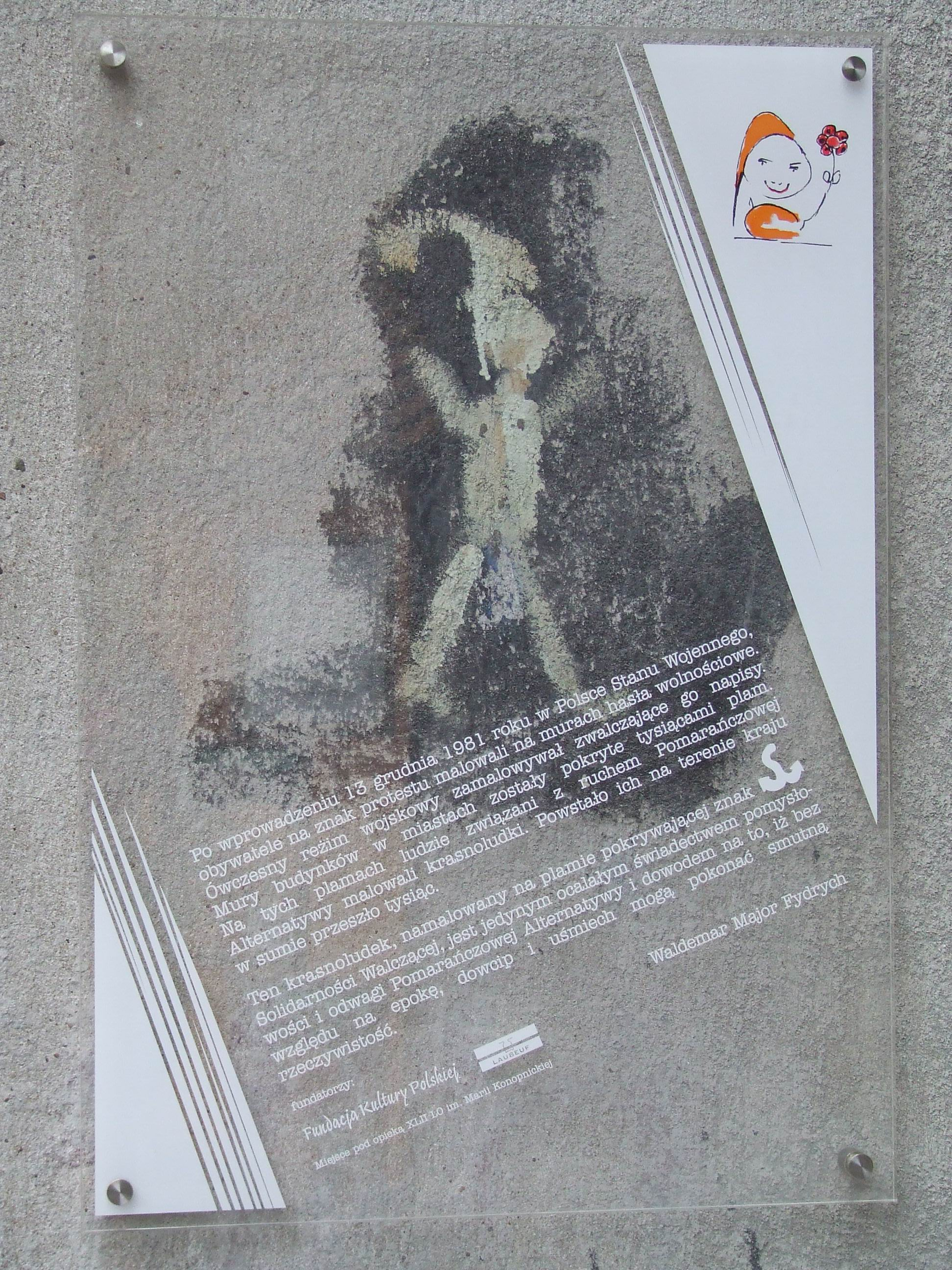
- The last remaining Orange Alternative Dwarf on Madalińskiego Street in Warsaw. Originally painted on the paint spot covering up the logo of another anti-communist group Solidarność Walcząca
- Years active: Early 1980s–1989; 2001–present
- Location: Wrocław, Polish People's Republic
- Major figures: Waldemar Fydrych
- Influences: Provo; Kabouters
- Influenced: Orange Revolution PORA

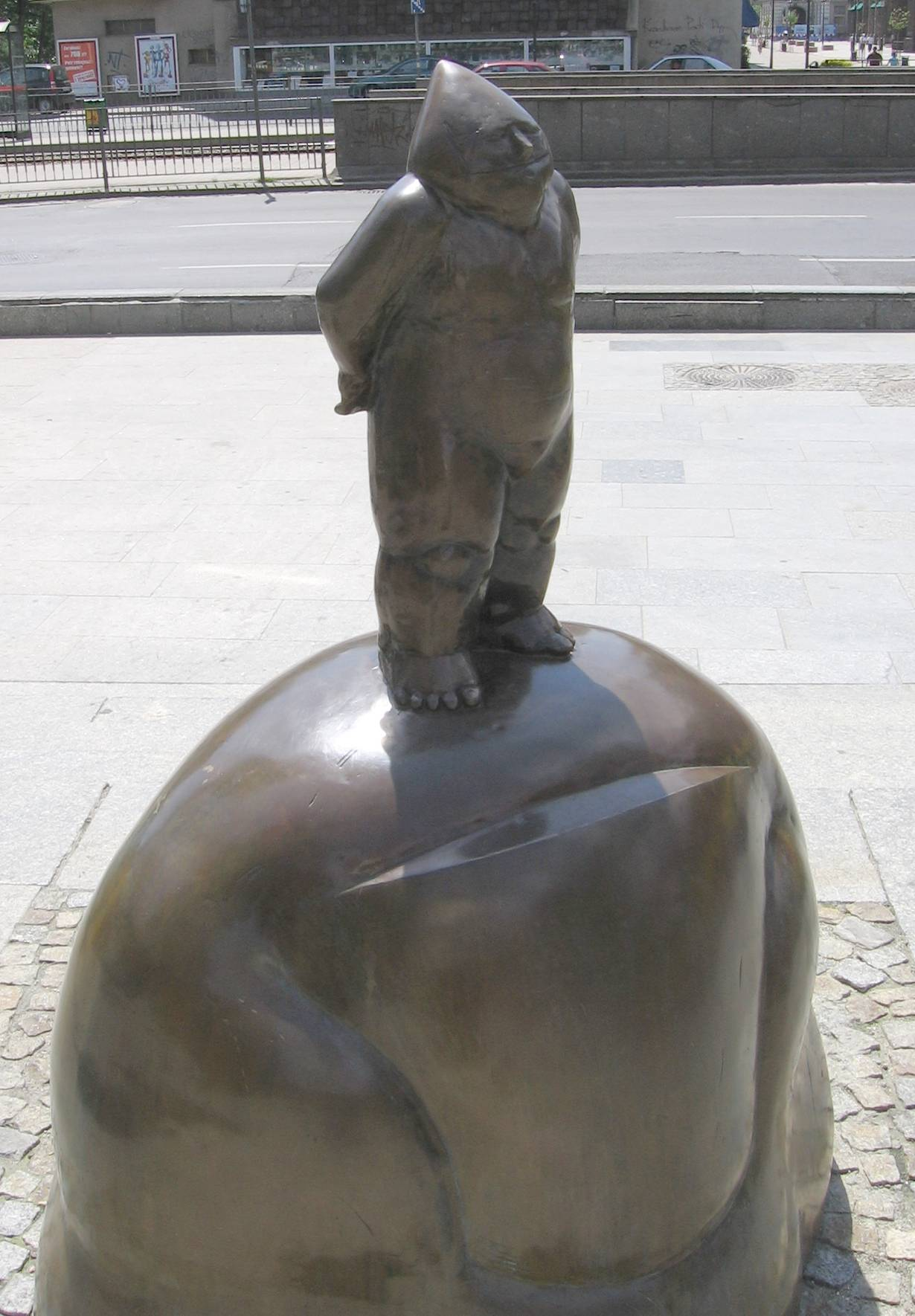
The Dwarf – the statue of the Orange Alternative symbol at the corner of Świdnicka and Kazimierza Wielkiego streets in Wrocław

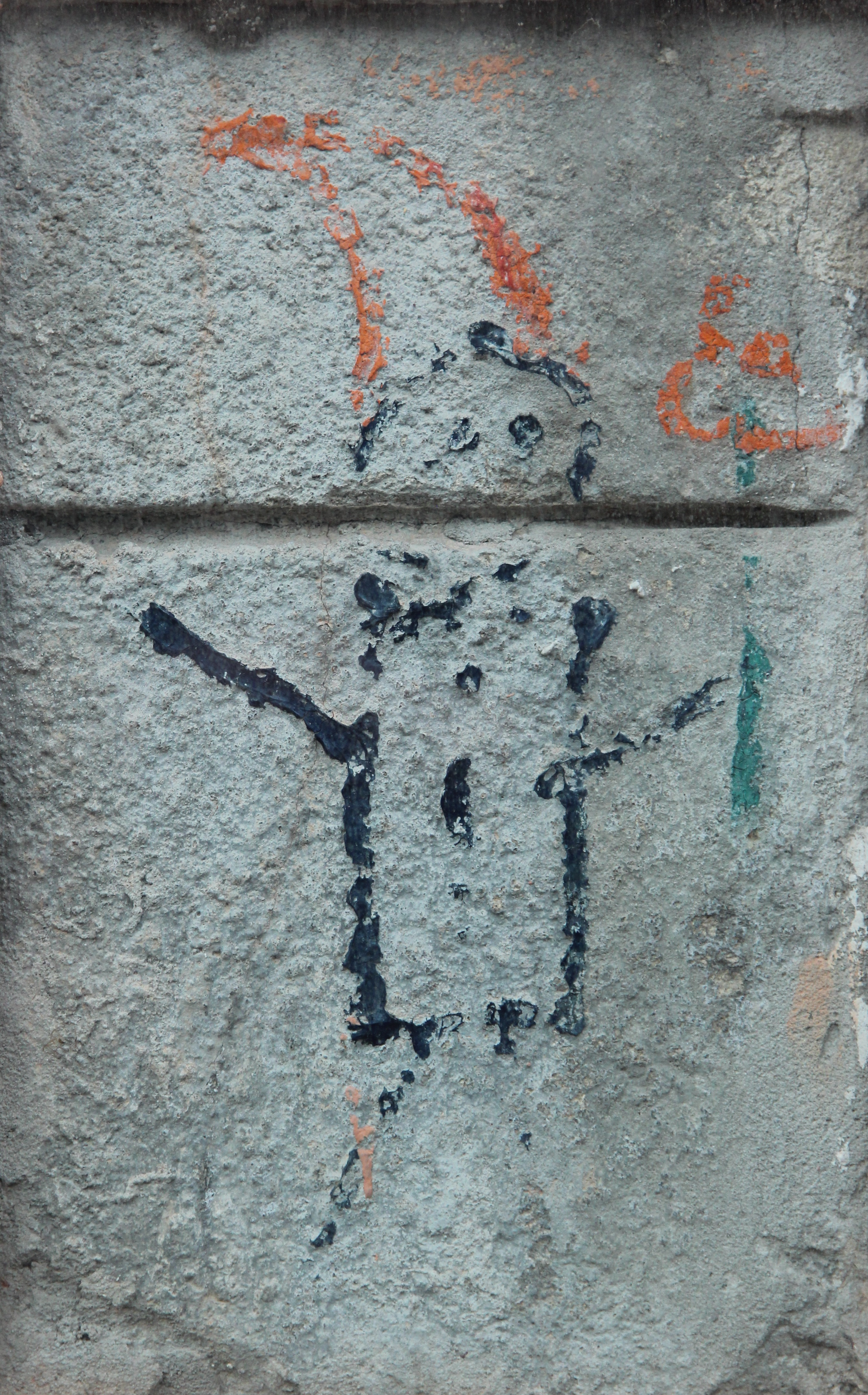
A preserved Orange Alternative dwarf graffiti

The Orange Alternative (Polish: Pomarańczowa Alternatywa) is a Polish anti-communist underground movement, started in Wrocław, a city in south-west Poland and led by Waldemar Fydrych (sometimes misspelled as Frydrych), commonly known as Major (Commander of Festung Breslau). Its main purpose in the 1980s was to offer a wider group of citizens an alternative way of opposition against the authoritarian regime by means of a peaceful protest that used absurd and nonsensical elements.

By doing this, members of the Orange Alternative could not be arrested by the police for opposition to the regime without the authorities becoming a laughing stock. The Orange Alternative has been viewed as part of the broader Solidarity movement. Sociology professor Lisa Romanienko has argued it was among the most effective of Solidarity's factions in dismantling anxiety and fear surrounding the dictatorial regime, in order to bring about the labor (and later social and cultural) movement's success.

Initially they painted ridiculous graffiti of dwarves on paint spots covering up anti-government slogans on city walls. Afterward, beginning in 1985 and continuing through to 1990, the group organized a series of more than sixty happenings in several Polish cities, including Wrocław, Warsaw, Łódź, Lublin, and Tomaszów Mazowiecki.

It suspended activity in 1989, but reactivated in 2001 and has been active on a small scale ever since.

A statue of a dwarf, dedicated to the memory of the movement, stands today on Świdnicka Street in Wrocław, in the place where events took place.

The Orange Alternative movement inspired several other similar movements in authoritarian countries including Czechoslovakia and Hungary, and it also inspired and influenced the PORA and the so-called Orange Revolution movement in Ukraine, which was in turn supported by Poland.

Some utterances ascribed to Waldemar Fydrych:

In Poland there are only three places when you can feel free: In churches, but only for prayers; in prisons, but not everyone can go to prison; and on the streets: they are the freest places.

The Western World will find out much more about the situation in Poland from hearing that I was sent to jail for handing out sanitary pads to women, than from reading books and articles written by other members of the opposition.

Can you treat a police officer seriously, when he is asking you: "Why did you participate in an illegal meeting of dwarfs?"

== Beginnings ==
The beginnings of the Orange Alternative were in a student movement called the Movement for New Culture created in 1980 at the University of Wrocław. In that year that Waldemar "Major" Fydrych, one of the movement's founders, proclaimed the Socialist Surrealism Manifesto, which became the ideological backbone behind a gazette called "The Orange Alternative". Seven out of the total fifteen issues of this gazette appeared during student strikes organized in November and December 1980 as part of the Solidarity upheaval. The first number was edited jointly by Major Waldemar Fydrych and Wiesław Cupała (a.k.a. "Rittmeister") simply with the aim of having fun. The editors treated the strike and the surrounding reality as forms of Art. For the ensuing numbers, the editorial committee was joined by Piotr Adamcio, known as "Lieutenant Pablo", Andrzej Dziewit and Zenon Zegarski, nicknamed "Lieutenant Zizi Top". Although its avantgarde character, according to the student strike organizers, was a threat to the "higher aims of the strike", and notwithstanding attempts by the strike committee to censor it, the gazette rapidly became very popular among the students.

== Dwarves ==
The first known actions of the Orange Alternative consisted of painting dwarf graffiti on spots created by the police's covering up anti-regime slogans on walls of the Polish cities. The first graffiti was painted by Major Waldemar Fydrych and Wiesław Cupała on the night from 30 to 31 August 1982 on one of the residences in the Wrocław district of Biskupin and Sępolno.

Altogether more than one thousand of such graffiti were painted in the major Polish cities such as Wrocław, Kraków, Warsaw, Łódź, and Gdańsk. Dwarves appearing in numbers all over Poland aroused the interest of both Polish pedestrians and the militia, whose intervention led to short term arrests of the graffiti artists.

During one of these incidents, Major, a detainee at a police station in Łódź, proclaimed, in reference to the Marxist and Hegelian dialectics, yet another artistic manifesto and referred to his graffiti art as "dialectic painting" stating: "The Thesis is the Anti-Regime Slogan. The Anti-thesis is the Spot and the Synthesis is the Dwarf. Quantity evolves into Quality. The more Dwarves there are, the better it is."

=== After Revolutions of 1989 ===
At the beginning of the 21st century, Wrocław's dwarfs began to appear around the city. Over time, they have become a major tourist attraction in Wrocław.

== Happenings ==
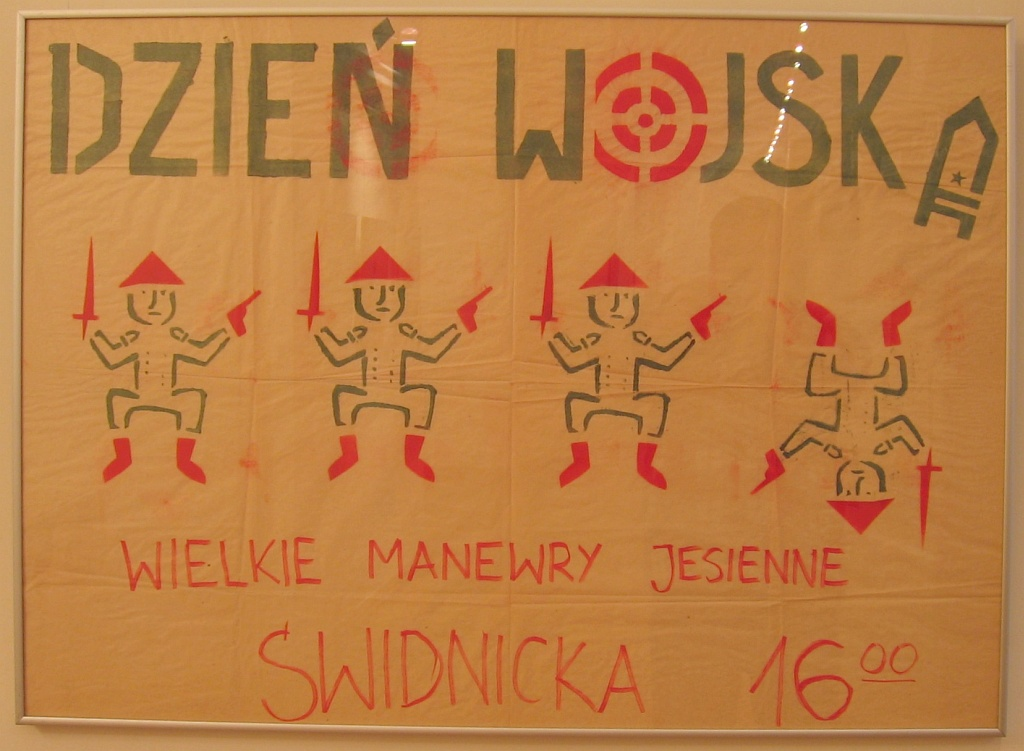
Poster for the Armed Forces Day on the 12th of October 1987 featuring armed dwarves

What brought the Orange Alternative the biggest fame were its street happenings which it organized throughout the second half of the 1980s. These actions gained it enormous popularity among the Polish youth, who joined the movement, seeing it an alternative to the opposition style presented by the Solidarity, which they viewed as more stiff and boring.

The first modest happening called the "Burning of Tubes" was organized as early as 1985 in Wrocław by Major Waldemar Fydrych accompanied by a small group of artists to which belonged: Krzysztof Skarbek, Piotr Petyszkowski, Andrzej Głuszek, and Sławomir Monkiewicz.

The breakthrough moment came in the fall of 1987, during the Open Theatre Festival in Wrocław, when the Village Voice reported the Orange Alternative's action known as "Distribution of Toilet Paper" – a happening that satirized the annoying lack of that consumer product at the time. After the publication of this article, the Orange Alternative became of interest to a number of Polish and foreign media.

The biggest happenings however took place in the years 1987 through 1989, with the "orange" wave spilling over Poland into cities such as Warsaw, Łódź, Lublin and Tomaszów Mazowiecki, following Major Fydrych's arrest on 8 March 1988.

The actions of the Orange Alternative – although its leaders and participants often expressed anarchistic viewpoints – were not inherently ideological. No serious demands were ever expressed. Rather, the slogans were surrealist in character (such as "Vivat Sorbovit", Sorbovit being a popular soft drink at that time) or "There is no freedom without dwarves". They often paraphrased slogans used by the Solidarity Union or the communists. Their role was to laugh at absurdities and pompousness of both sides of the system and provoke independent thinking.

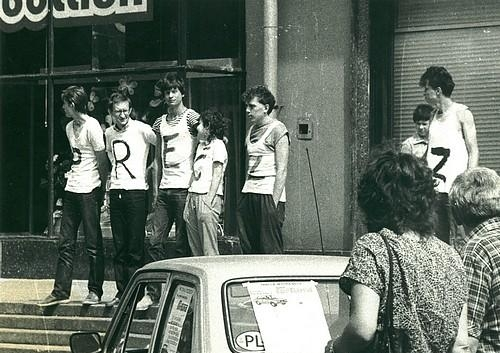

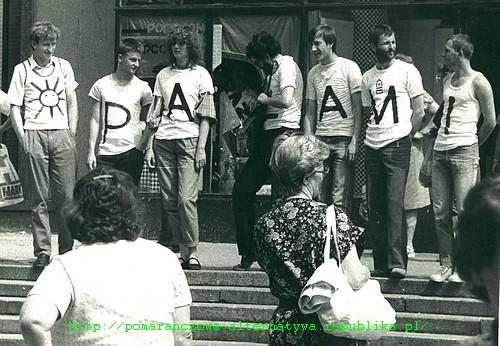

PRECZ Z UPAŁAMI (in Polish) – "AWAY WITH HOT WEATHER"; if the person wearing letter 'U' shirt turns away, the text says PRECZ Z PAŁAMI (in Polish) – "AWAY WITH BATONS" – happening in Wrocław, July 1988)

The open street formula allowed all individuals to take part in the happenings. This openness drew thousands of pedestrians to participate in the group's actions. In such a way, the majority of the happenings could assemble thousands of participants, of whom many were accidental passers-by. The culmination point in the movement's history was the action organized on 1 June 1988, known as the "Revolution of Dwarves", during which more than 10 thousand people marched through the center of Wrocław wearing orange dwarf hats.

The happenings usually terminated with the arrest of hundreds of participants, who did not manage to escape in time from the hands of the militia. At one point, the participants were even able to provoke the Communist militia to arrest 77 Santa Clauses or, on another occasion, anyone wearing anything orange.

For each of its actions, the Orange Alternative printed leaflets and posters, featuring slogans like "Every militiaman is a piece of Art" or "Citizen, help the militia, beat yourself up".

== See also ==
- Budai
- Wrocław's dwarfs
- Fighting Solidarity
- Nonviolent resistance
- Orange Revolution
- Tactical Frivolity
- Spaßguerilla
- The Smurfs
- Youth International Party

== Sources ==
- Juliusz Tyszka. "The Orange Alternative: Street happenings as social performance in Poland under Martial Law." Cambridge.org, New Theatre Quarterly. vol. 14 (56), 1998. p. 00311
- Nicole Gourgaud. Doctoral thesis, Université de Lyon – November 1993
- The orange alternative, drukarnia Efekt, Warszawa 2008 – a very readable book about the movement from its very beginning
