= Major Waldemar Fydrych =

Polish activist (born 1953)

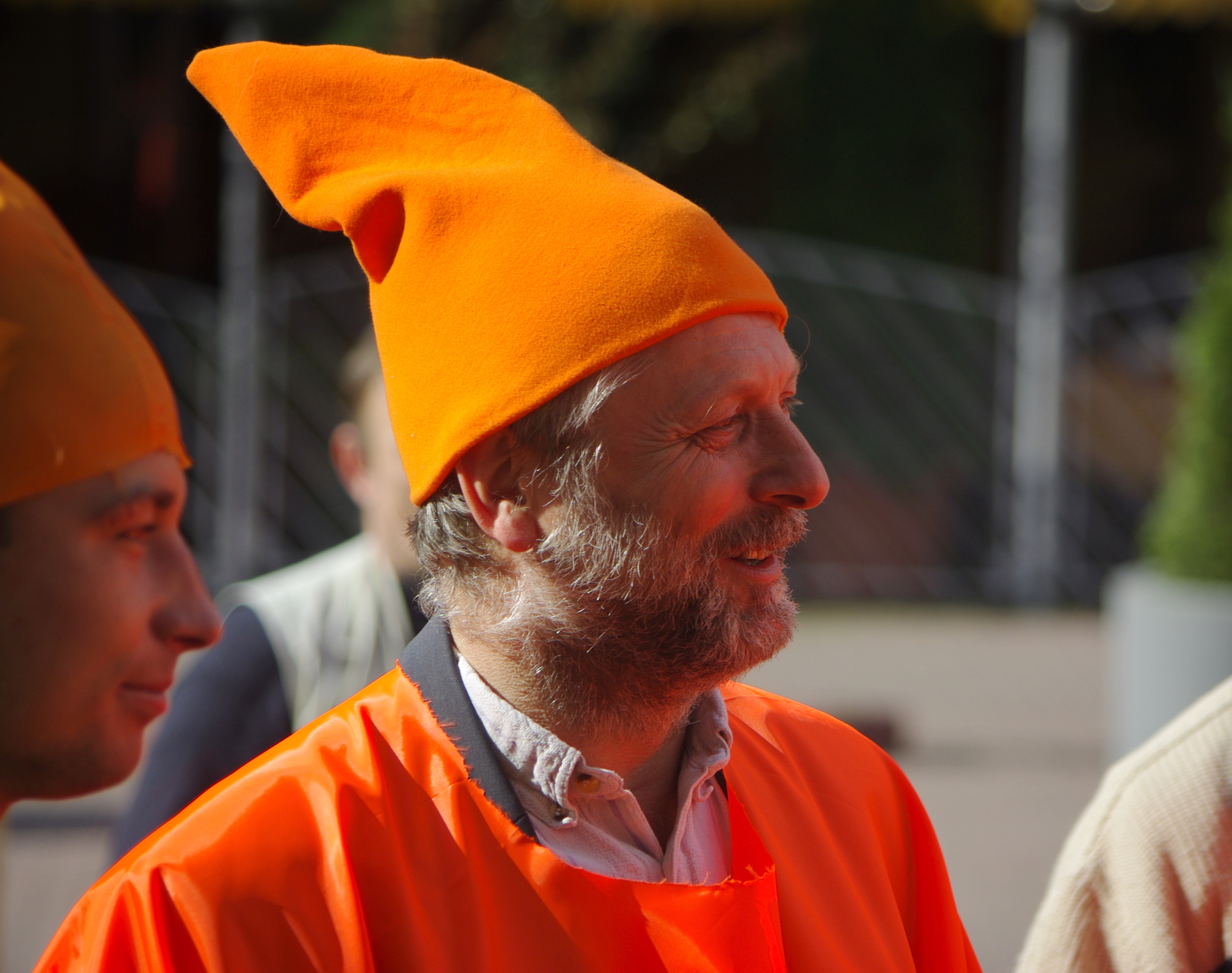
- Born: Waldemar Andrzej Fydrych; 1953 (age 72–73); Toruń, Poland
- Organizations: Orange Alternative; Gamonie i Krasnoludki
- Known for: Situationist graffiti
- Awards: Wrocław Decoration of Honor – Poland

Academic background
- Education: University of Wrocław
- Alma mater: Academy of Fine Arts in Warsaw
- Thesis: Happening jako operacja integrująca, uzdrawiająca, transformująca sztukę i rzeczywistość (2012)
- Doctoral advisor: Stanisław Wieczorek

Academic work
- Notable works: Lives of the Orange Men

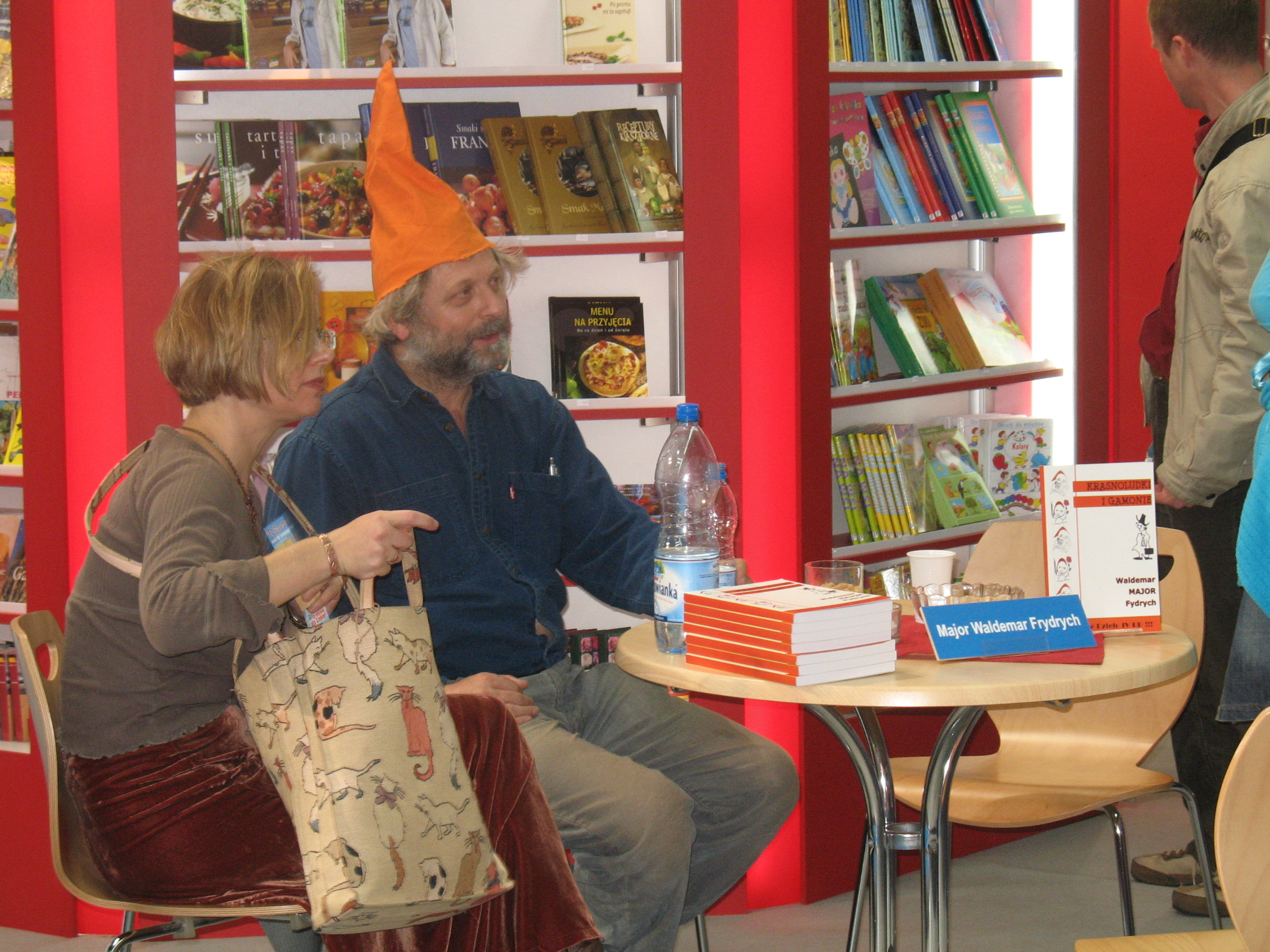
Major Waldemar Fydrych at the International Book Fair in Kraków, October 2006

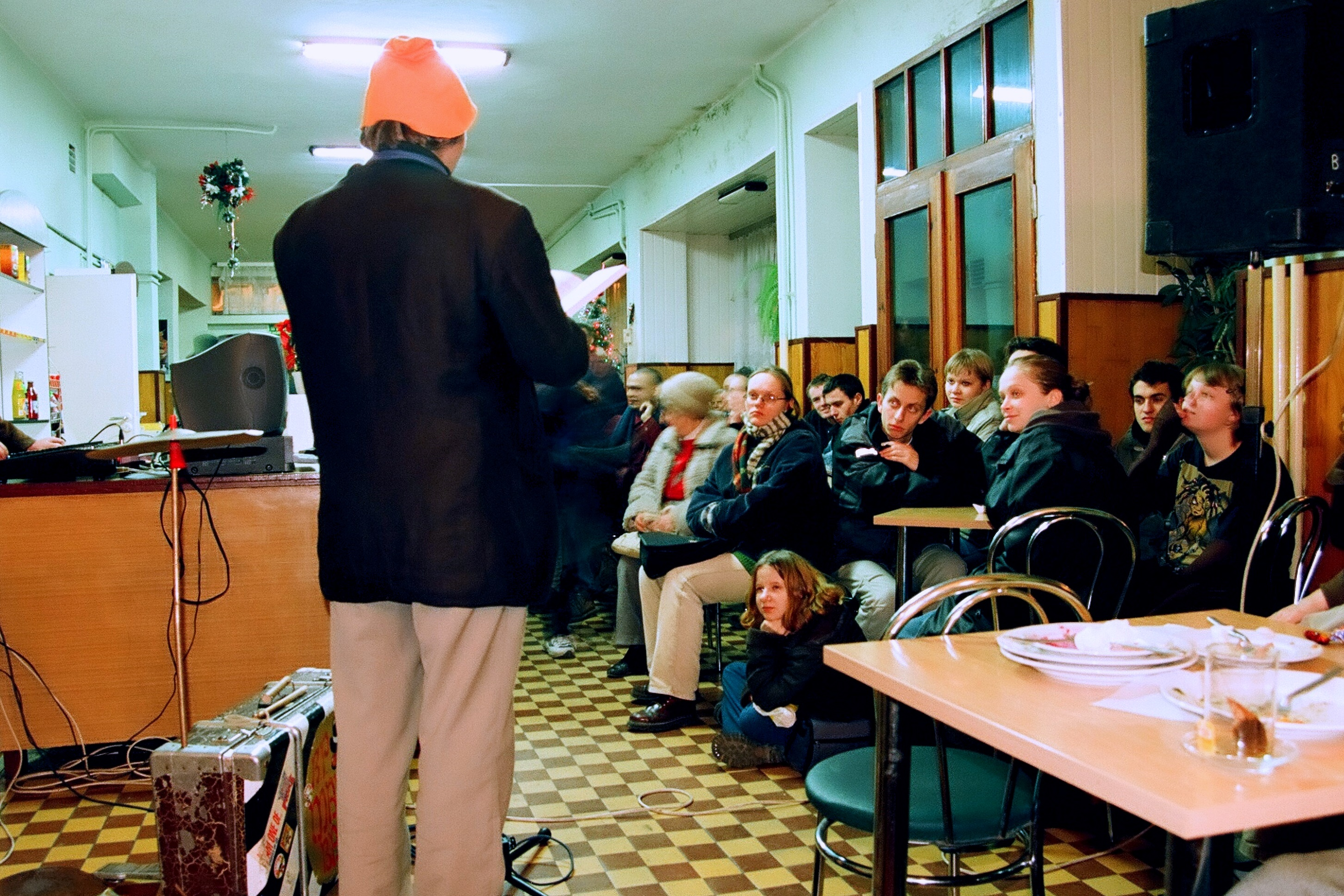
In a bar mleczny in Gorzów Wielkopolski ( 2001 )

Waldemar Andrzej Fydrych "Major" (born April 8, 1953) is a Polish activist and founding leader of the Orange Alternative movement in Poland.

== Early career ==
Fydrych was born in Toruń, Poland on April 8, 1953. He is a graduate of the History and History of Art Faculty of the University of Wrocław. Fydrych began his independent public activity in the 1970s. He created a branch of the Independent Students Union (NZS) in Wrocław and launched the Movement for New Culture in the city. He was also one of the co-organizers of a massive peace march that took place in April 1981.

During the Martial Law, many Poles first made acquaintance with Fydrych's work through his picturesque dwarf images painted on building walls, covering up the paint that was used to cover up anti-regime slogans.

== The Orange Alternative ==
Starting in 1986, he began organizing a chain of happenings, which were eventually named the Orange Alternative. These happenings involved hundreds up to thousands of participants at a given time. At its heyday in 1987, 1988 and 1989, Major Fydrych's Orange Alternative spread to other Polish cities, Warsaw, Łódź, Wrocław and Lublin being the most active. Altogether in the period of 1986 to 1990 the Orange Alternative organized over 60 street happenings. In March 1988, after distributing women's sanitary pads on the street (an item that was in severe shortage in Communist Poland), Fydrych was arrested and sentenced by the Court of Justice to three months of imprisonment. He was released following public uproar, including a letter to the military junta signed by the foremost Polish intellectuals and artists.

== Nickname ==
During the communist regime, when Fydrych was called upon to fulfill his military service obligation, he appeared before the army commission dressed in a uniform of a major. Unwilling to enter the army, he pretended the opposite, simulating madness. Asked to use an appropriate tone in regard to his superiors, Fydrych began addressing his interlocutors per "colonel," at the same time describing himself as a "major," a nickname which remained with him ever since.

== Recent activities ==
Fydrych, alongside a group of students, participated in the Orange Revolution in Ukraine organizing events in Poland and Ukraine. He and the students made in the streets an "Orange Scarf" of support for the revolution. This scarf was started in Warsaw by one of the icons of the Orange Revolution – famous Ukrainian singer Ruslana Lyzhichko. On the night of the "Orange Victory", the 15-meter long scarf was handed by Lyzhichko to President Yushchenko as one of the main symbols of the brotherhood between Ukraine and Poland.

In 2002, Fydrych presented himself in elections to the post of the Mayor of the City of Warsaw. He also ran for mayor of Warsaw in 2006 elections, gaining 2914 votes (0.41%). His organization was Gamonie i Krasnoludki (Dolts and Dwarves).

In 2012, Fydrych received Ph.D. in Fine Arts from the Academy of Fine Arts in Warsaw, Poland after defending his thesis "Happening as the integrating and healing operation transforming art and reality" written under the supervision of Professor Stanisław Wieczorek.

In 2014, the English translation of his book on Orange Alternative was published as Lives of the Orange Men by a London publishing house, Minor Compositions. with a foreword by the Yes-Men and the forward to the Polish edition by Anne Applebaum.

In 2013, Major Fydrych and his dwarf graffiti were featured in Brad Finger's book „Surrealism - 50 Works of Art You Should Know” published by PRESTEL Publishing along with works of such great artists as Artaud, Duchamp, Buñuel, Dali and Picasso.

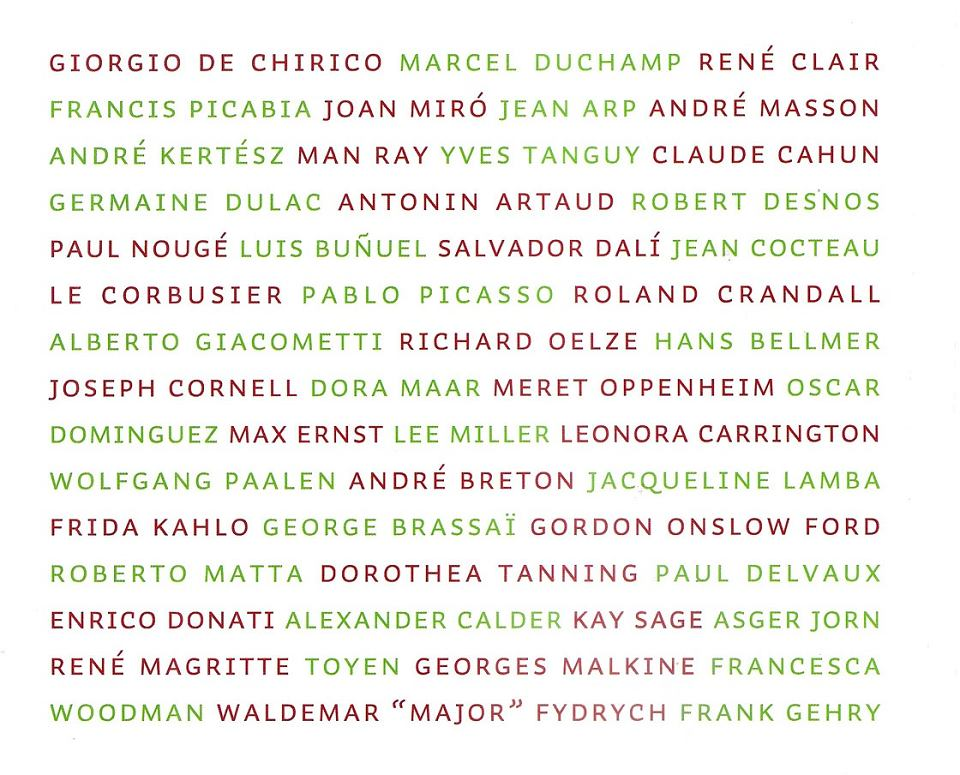

== Honors and awards ==
- 1988 Solidarity Award of Puls in London.
- 1988 Award of Polkul in Australia.
- In June 2005, Fydrych and the Orange Alternative movement were honored by an exposition held at the European Parliament in Brussels.
- Four films have been produced and aired on the public Polish Television (TVP), including a documentary on the Orange Alternative and the Orange Revolution.

== Publications ==
- Fydrych, W. Hokus Pokus
- Fydrych, W. The Lives of the Orange Men Publisher: Minor Compositions. July 2014. ISBN 9781570272691
- Fydrych, W. Dwarves & Dolts
- Fydrych, W. The Orange Alternative - Revolution of Dwarves

== Quotes ==
- "In Poland there are only three places when you can feel free: in churches, but only for the meditations, in prisons, but not everyone can go to prison, and on the streets - they are the freest places."
- "The Western World will find out much more about the situation in Poland from hearing that I was put to jail for giving tampons to a woman, than from reading the books and articles written by other people from the opposition."
- "Can you treat a police officer seriously, when he is asking you the question: 'Why did you participate in an illegal meeting of dwarfs?"

== See also ==
- Poland
- Orange Alternative
- Martial law in Poland
