= Dwarven language =

Dwarven or Dwarvish language may refer to:

- Khuzdûl, the tongue of the Dwarves in J. R. R. Tolkien's Middle-earth
- Kad'k, the language of the dwarfs in Terry Pratchett's Discworld novels
- Dethek, the Dwarvish language in Dungeons & Dragons
- Khazalid, the Dwarvish language in Warhammer

== See also ==
- Dwarven script
