= Wrocław Dwarfs =

Small figurines in the streets of Wrocław, Poland

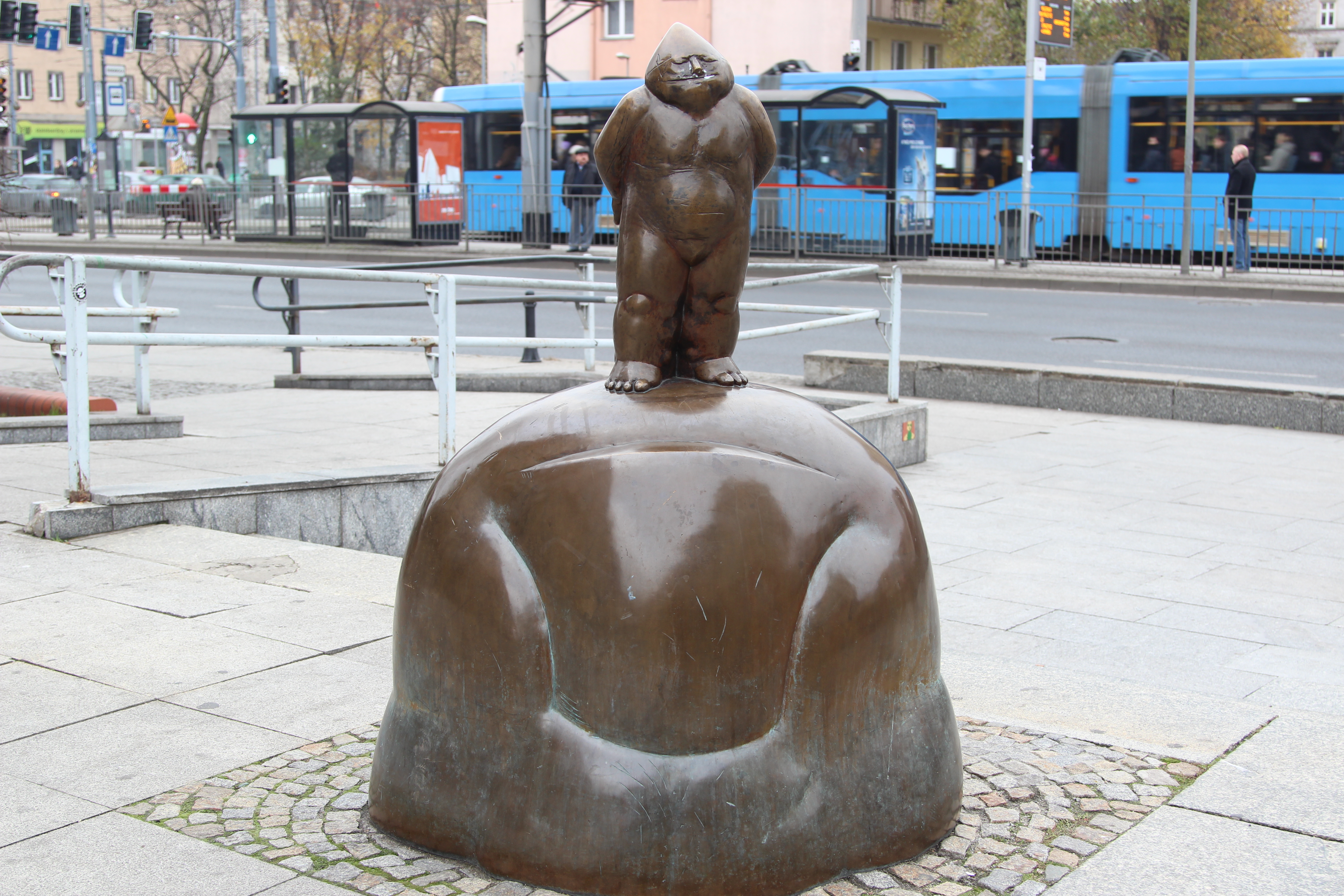
Wrocław's first dwarf was Papa Dwarf standing on the tip of a human finger. It honors the Orange Alternative.

Wrocław Dwarves or Wrocław Gnomes (Polish: Wrocławskie krasnale) are small figurines (20–30 cm) that have appeared in the streets of Wrocław, Poland since 2005. The dwarves are a major tourist attraction for the city, which is the third largest in Poland. Tourists often walk around the city with a map trying to find all of them.

As of 2024, there were over 800 dwarves in the city. Six of them are located outside the city at the LG plant in Biskupice Podgórne. As of 2026, the number of dwarves in the city is estimated at around 1,040.

== History ==
In 2001, a monument of a dwarf was placed on Świdnicka Street to commemorate the Orange Alternative, a Polish anti-communist movement, and its symbol. In 2003, the mayor of Wrocław, in an attempt to continue the new tradition, unveiled a small plaque on the door of The Dwarves' Museum. It is found at knee height on the wall of a historic tenement called Jaś, which is situated between the Market Square and St. Elizabeth's Church.

The dwarf figures, which are smaller than the Orange Alternative monument on Świdnicka Street, were placed in various locations throughout the city. The first five, designed by Tomasz Moczek, a graduate of the Academy of Fine Arts in Wrocław, were installed in August 2005. These included the Fencer near the University of Wrocław, the Butcher in Stare Jatki arcade, two Sisyphuses on Świdnicka Street, and the Oder-Washer-Dwarf, near the Piasek Bridge. The last dwarf's name is related to Pracze Odrzańskie, a district on the outskirts of the city. The number of figures has continued to grow since then.

On June 18, 2008, a ceremony was held to unveil two new dwarves on Świdnicka Street, next to W-skers. The figures represent two disabled dwarves: the Deaf-Mute and the Blind. They are part of the Wrocław Without Barriers campaign, which aims to draw attention to handicapped people living in Wrocław. Five days later, another dwarf was erected at the Hematology and Pediatric Oncology Clinic in Wrocław. The design for this third female dwarf, Marzenka, was based on the logo of the Mam marzenie charity.

The Dwarves' Festival takes place in Wrocław every year in September.

== Gallery ==
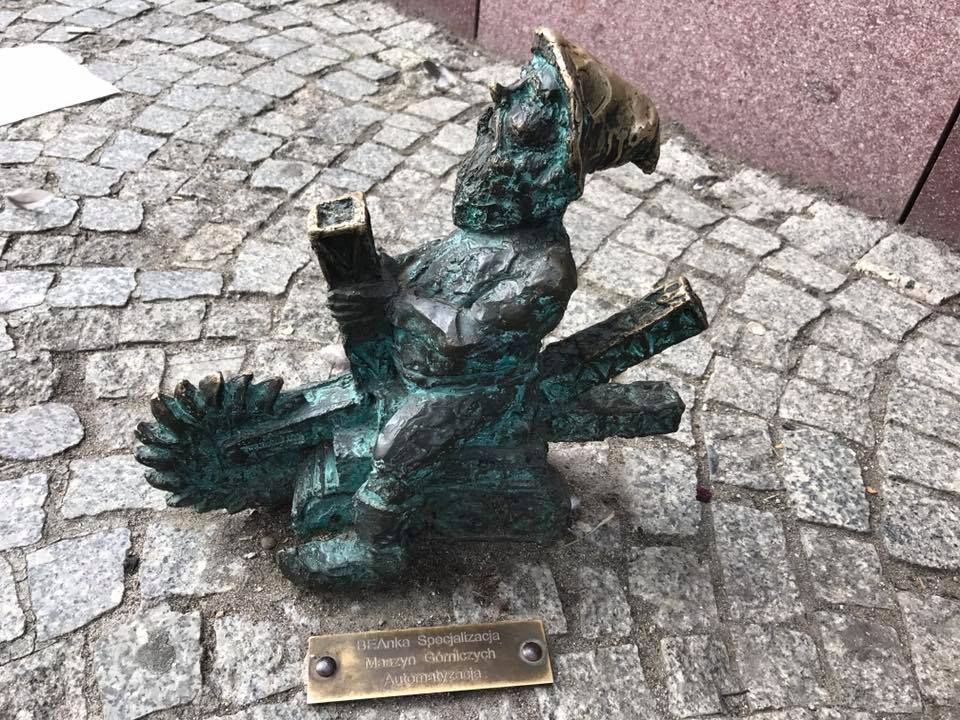
Automator

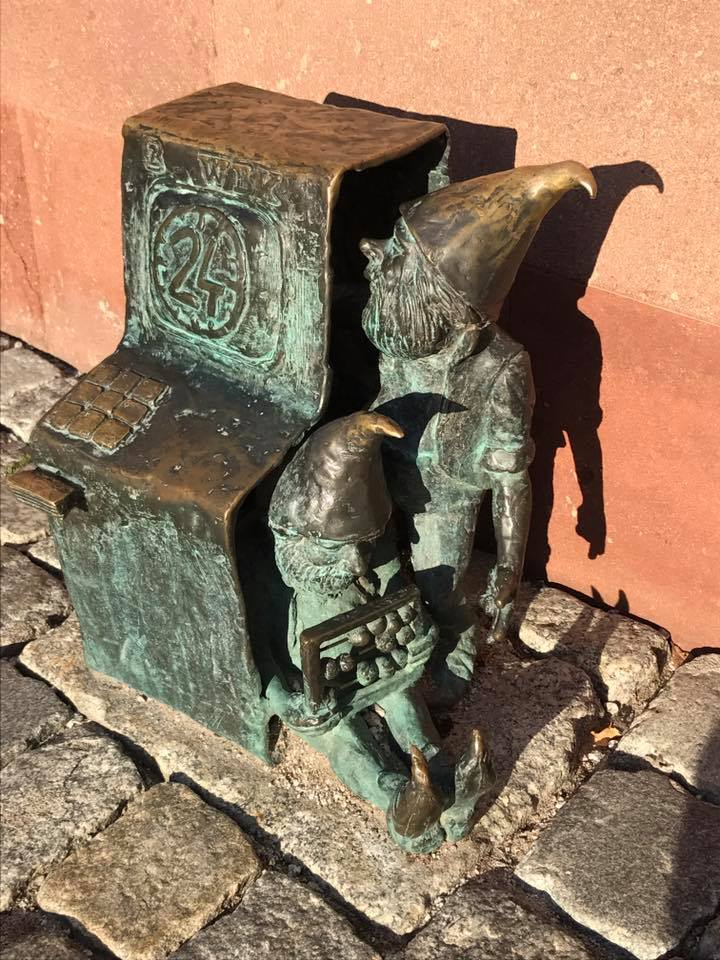
ATMers

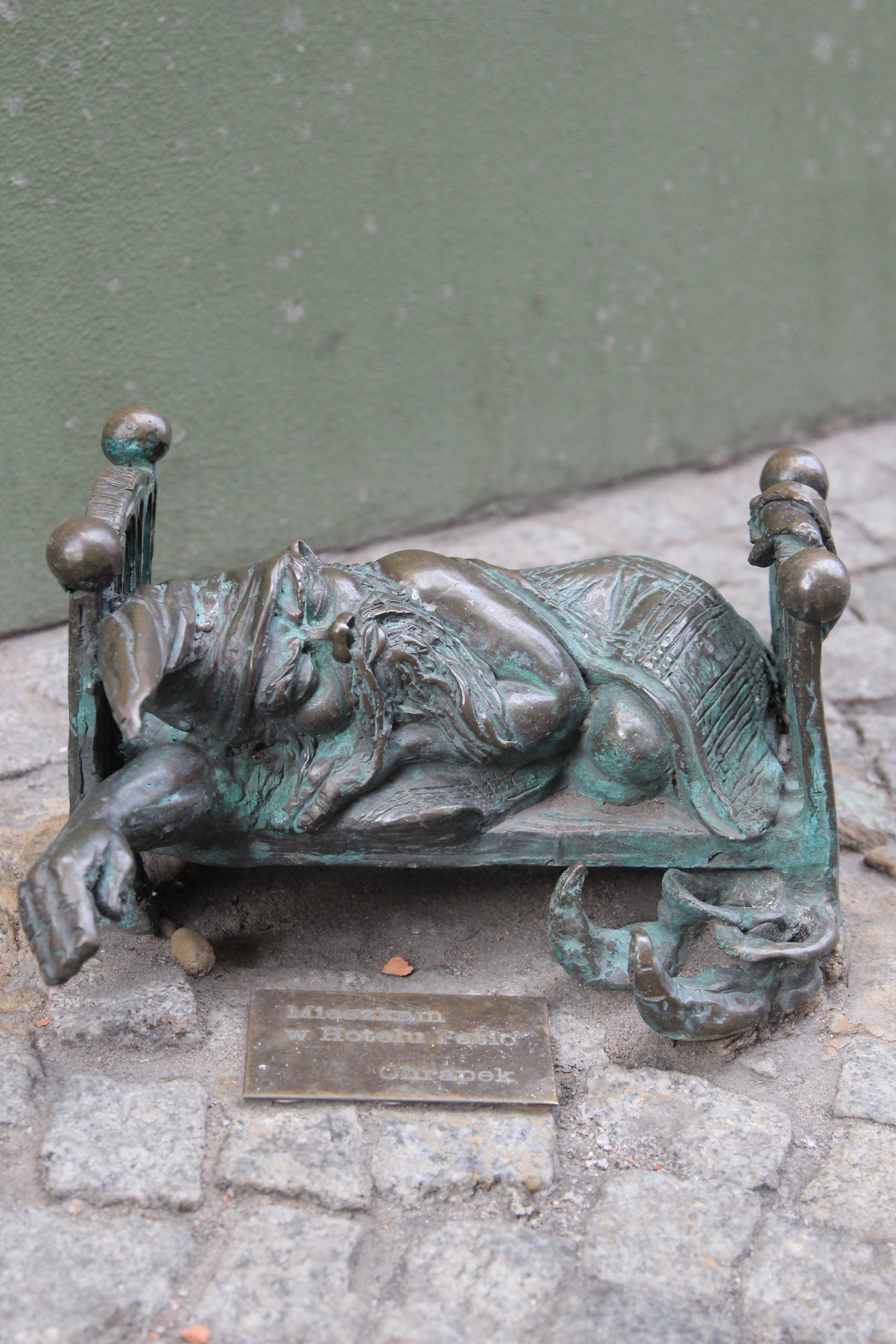
Snorer

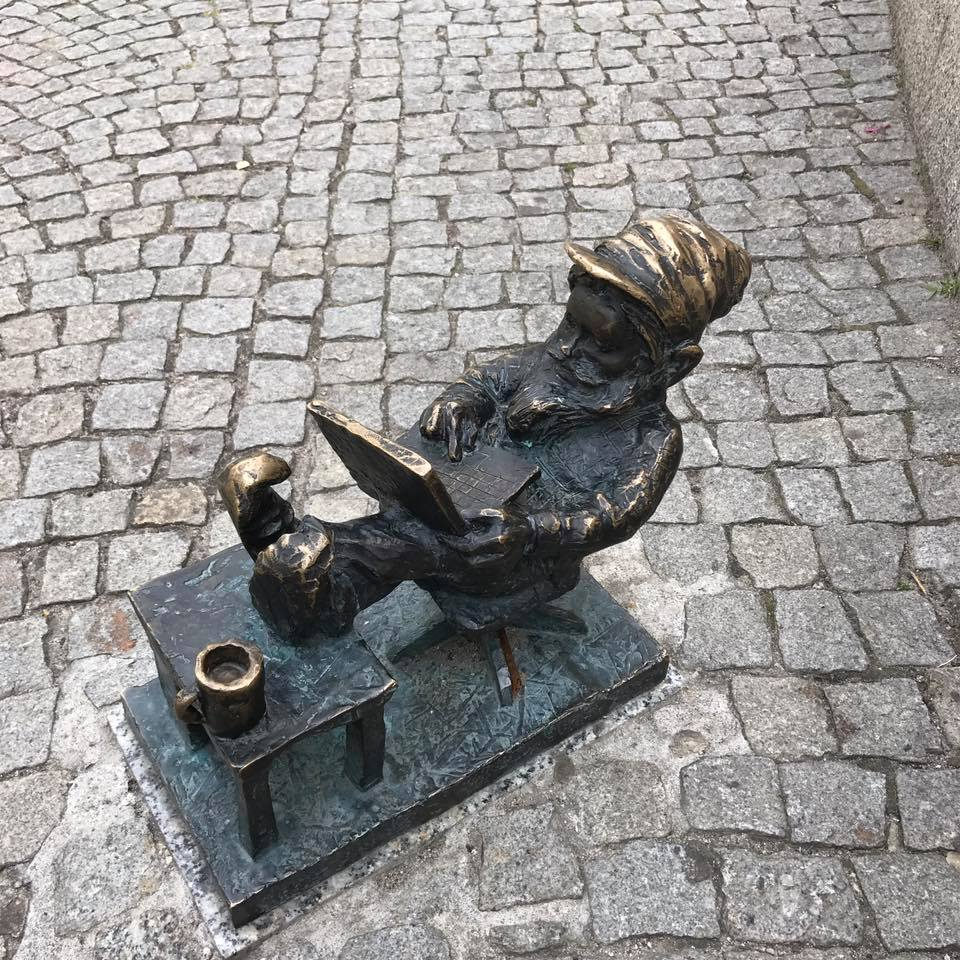
Programmer Capgeminiusz

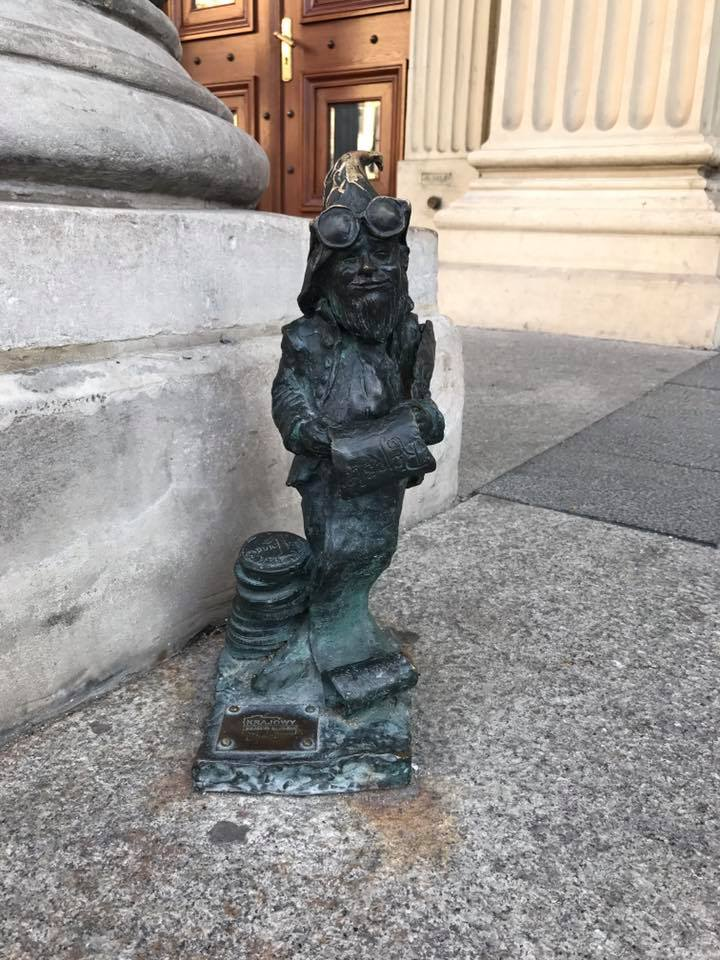
Long One

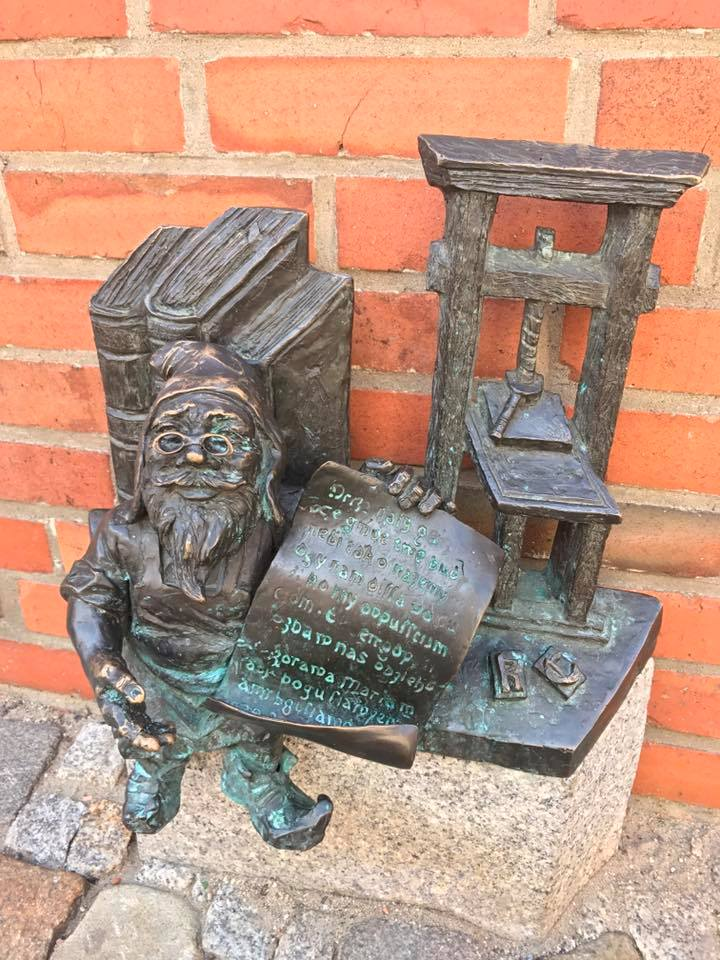
Printer Kacper

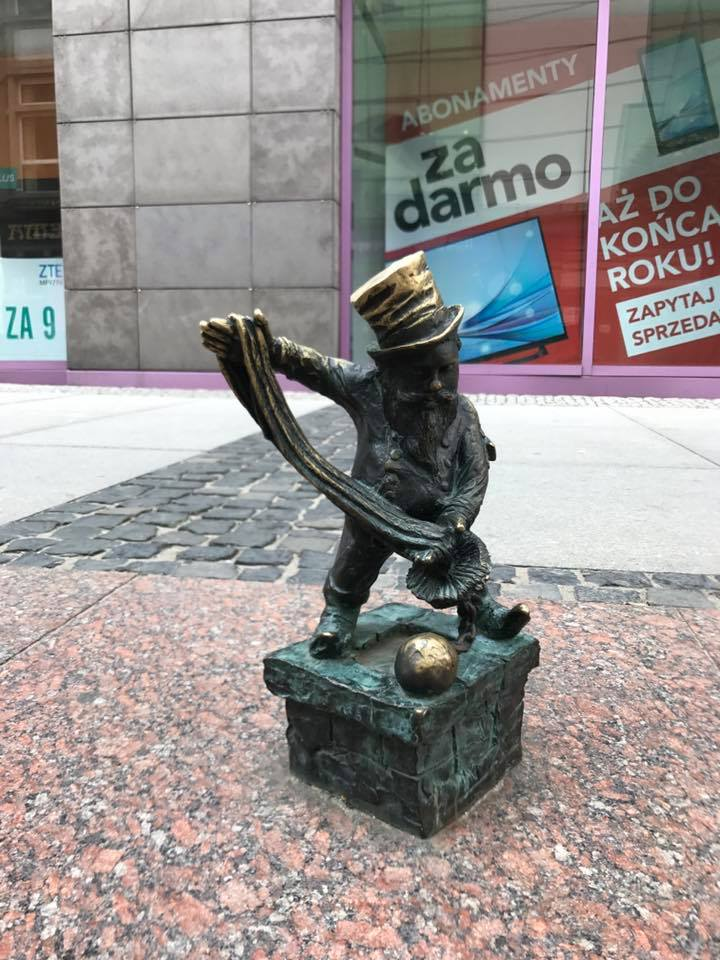
Florianek

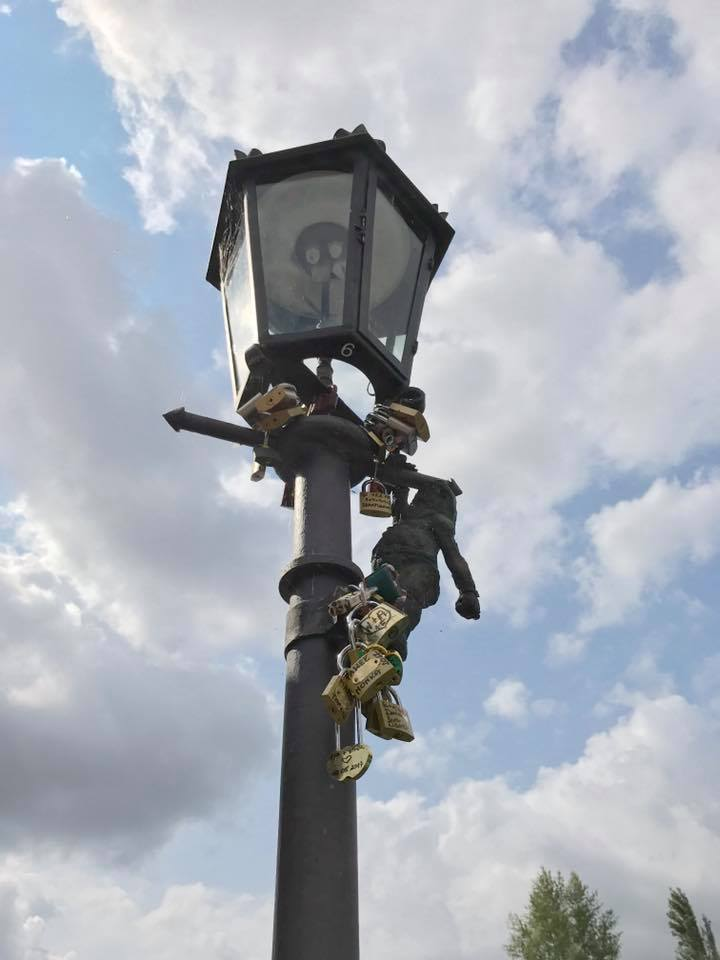
Gazuś

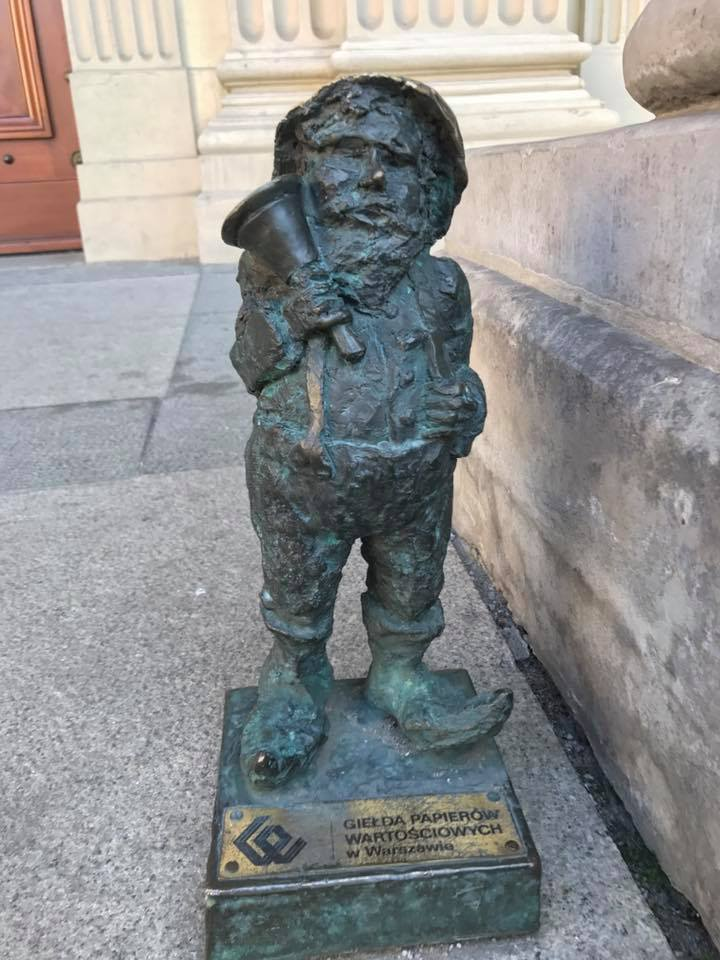
Exchanger

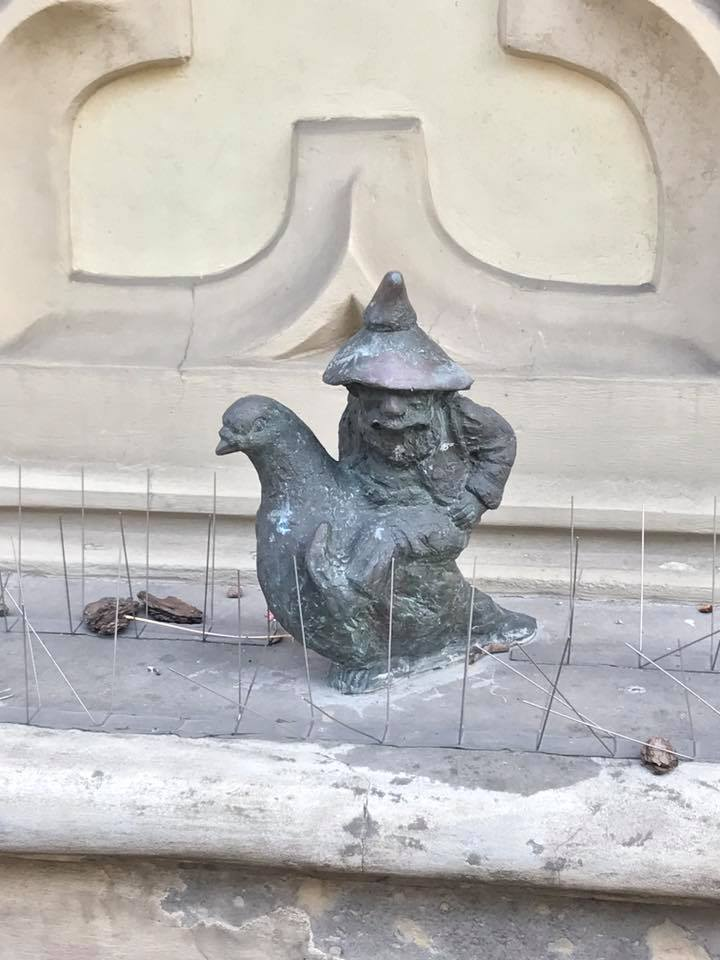
Pigeoner

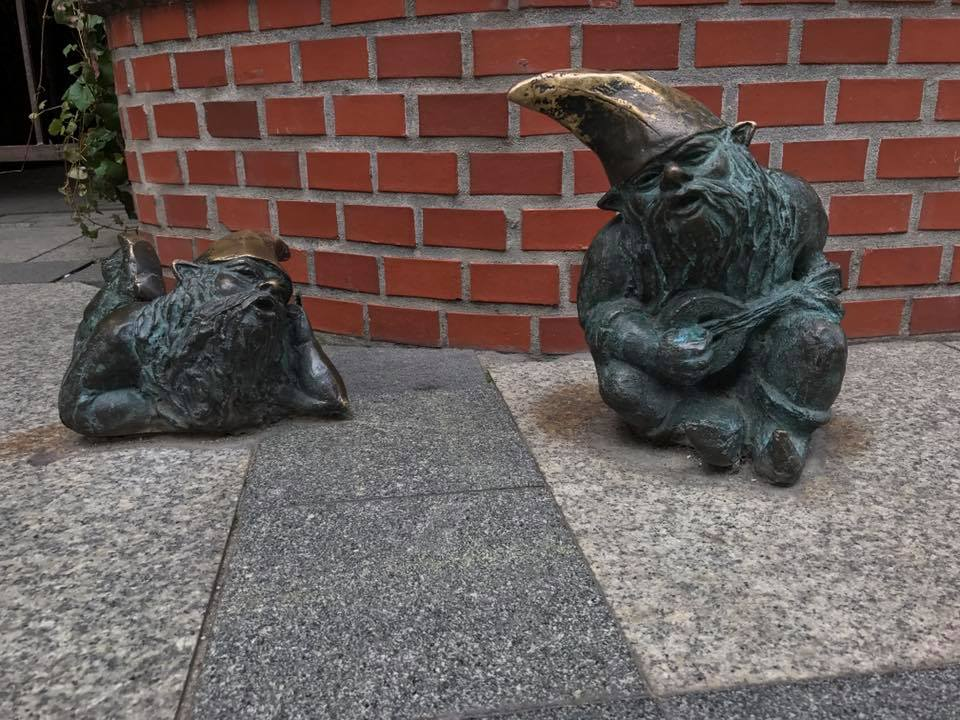
Player and Melomaniac

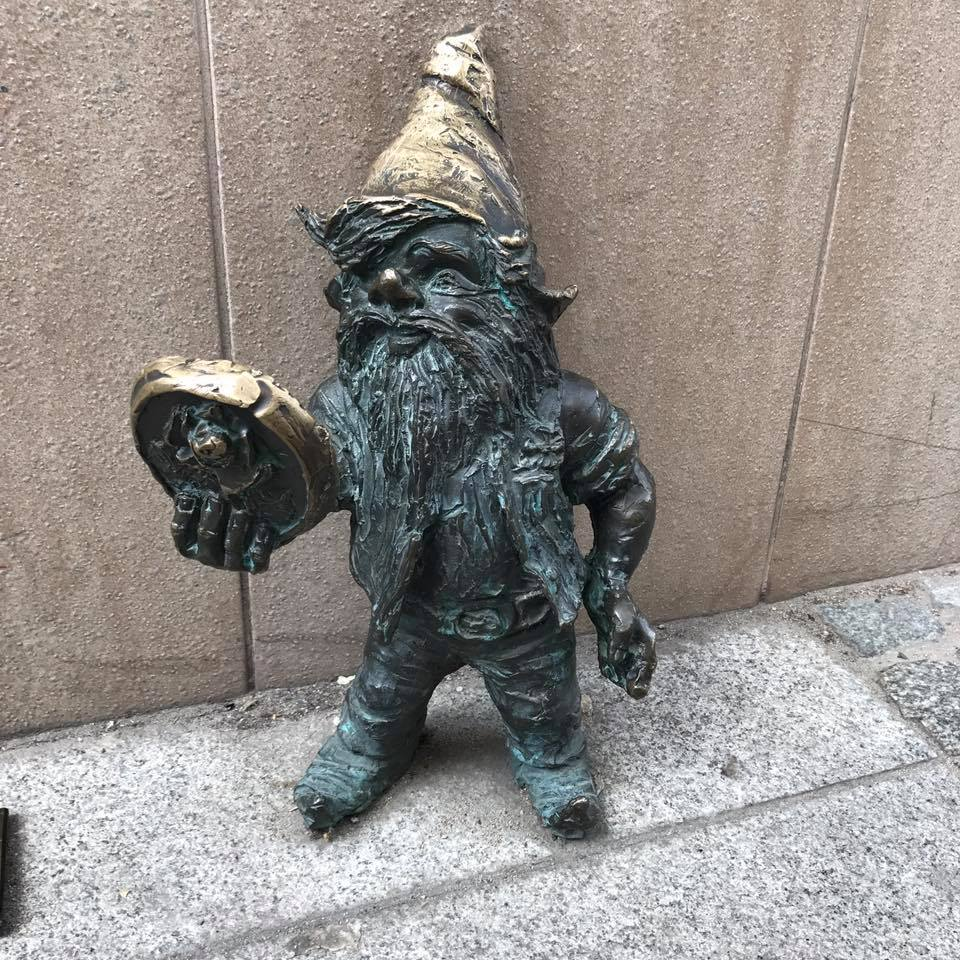
Janinek

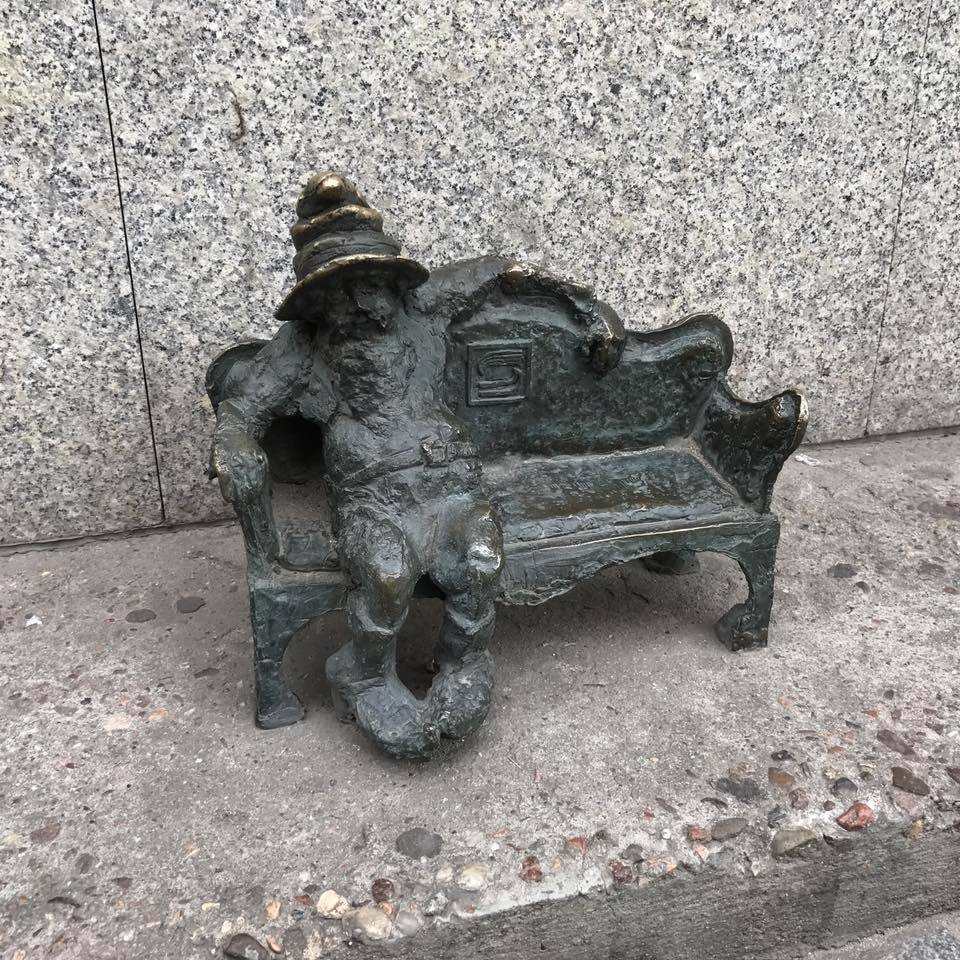
Couchman

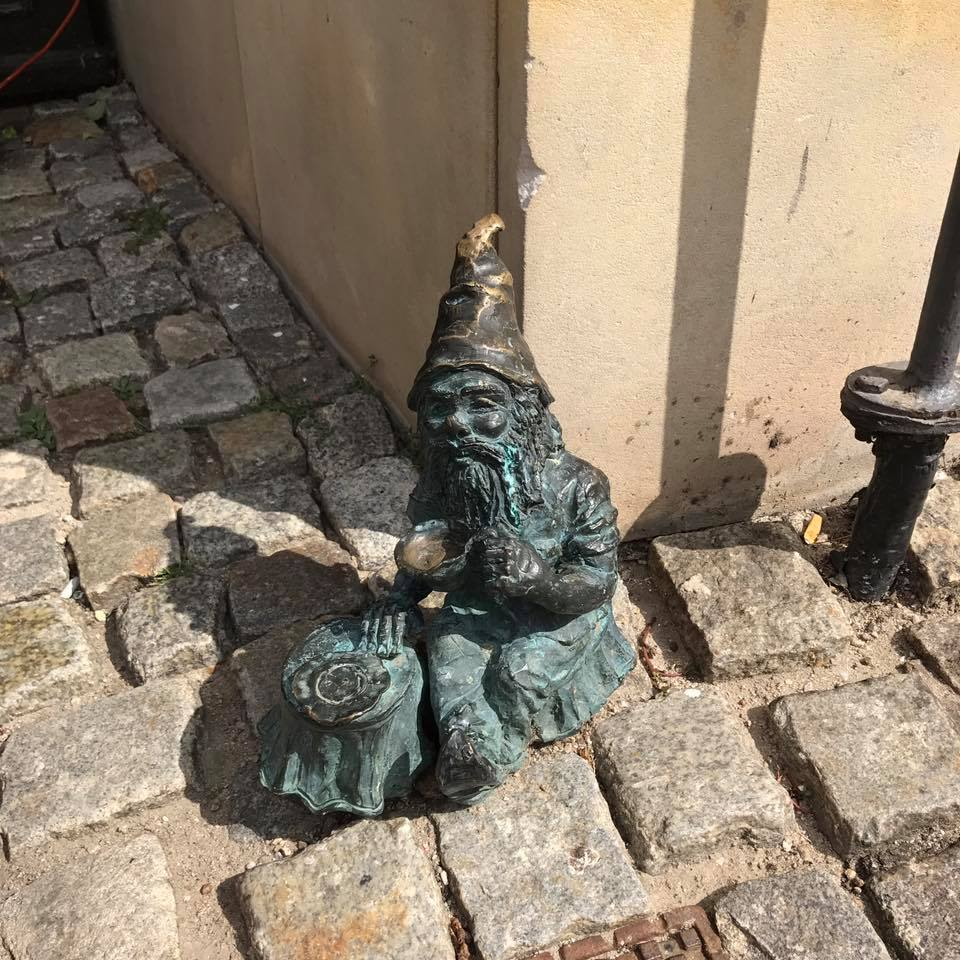
Coffee Lover

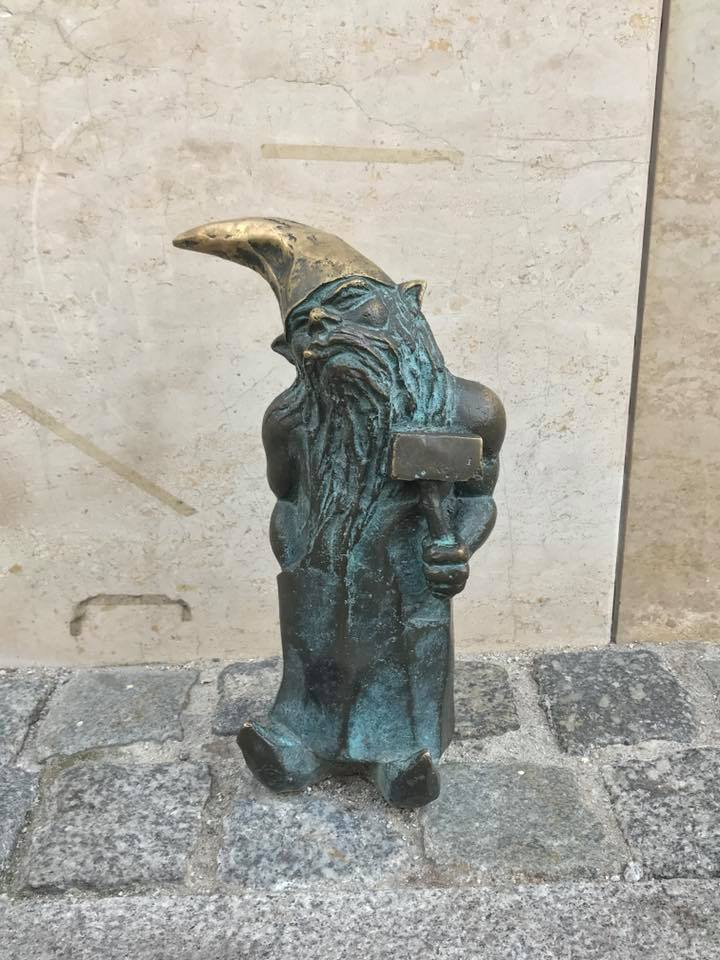
Smith

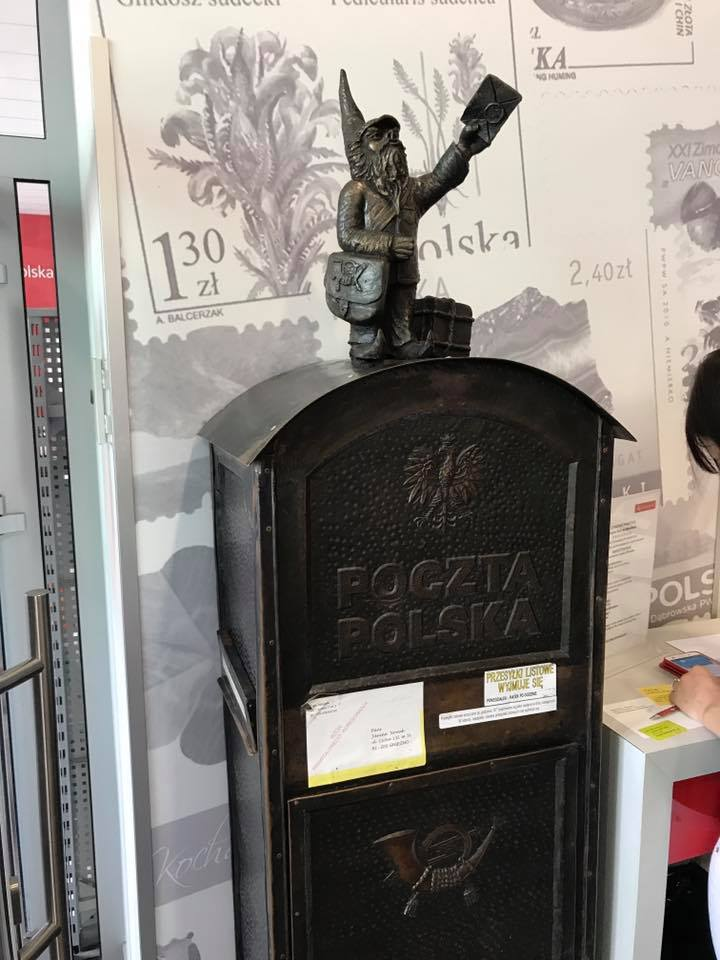
Mailman

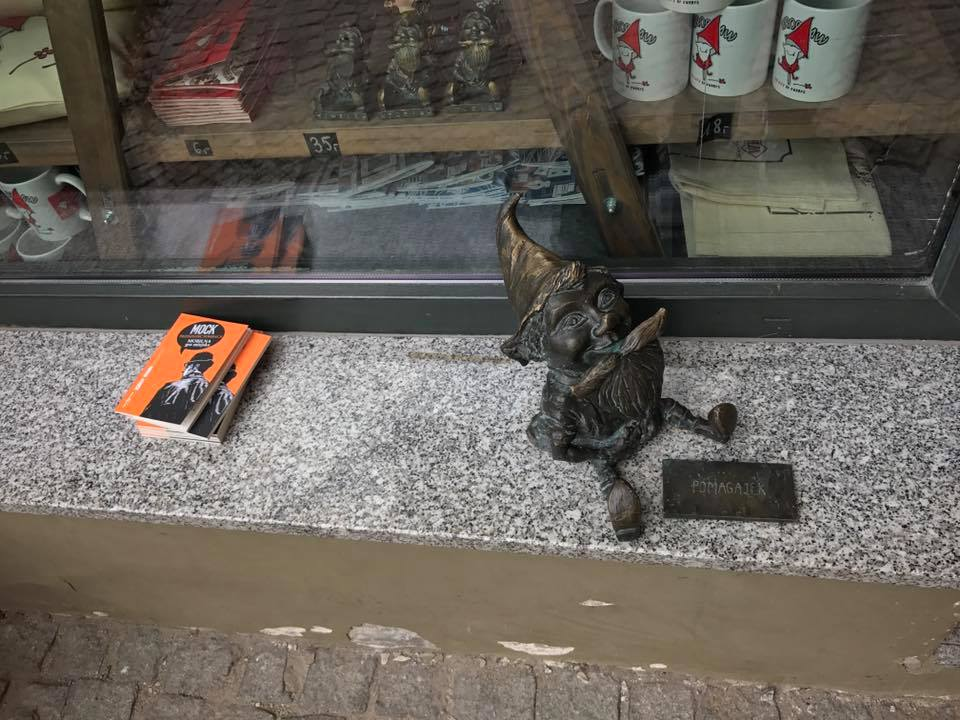
Helper

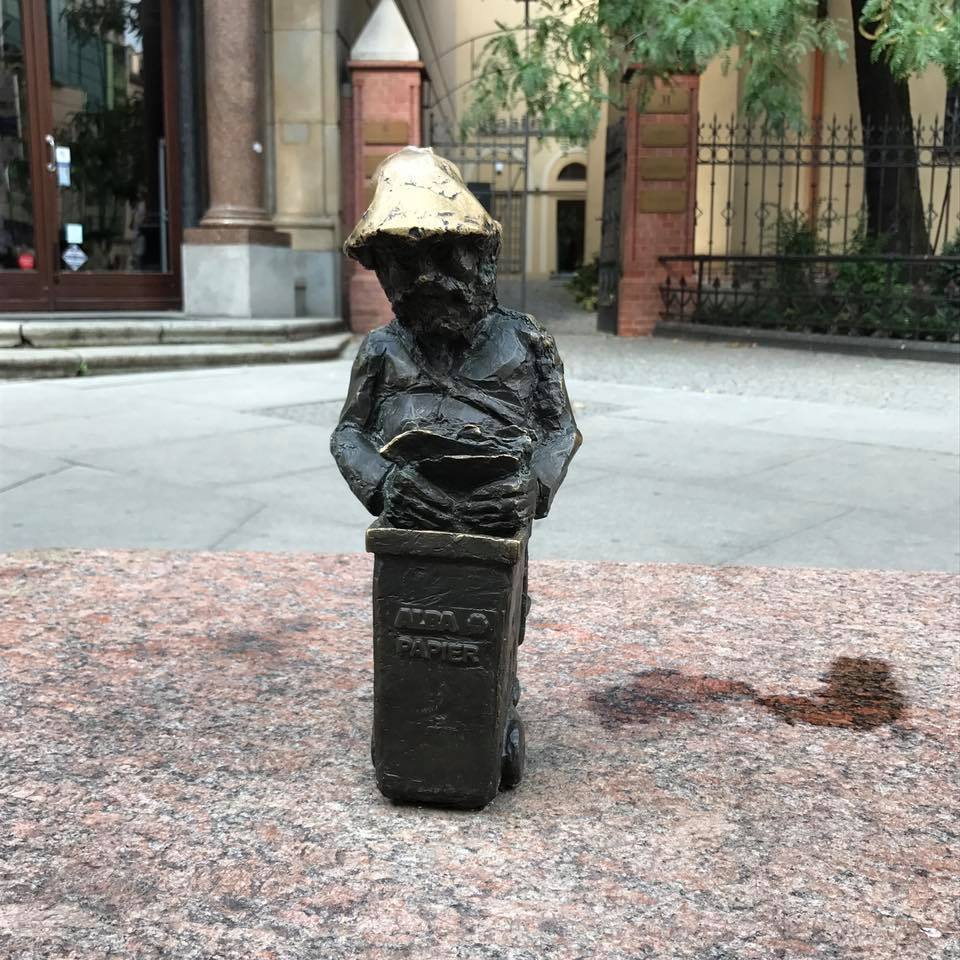
Recycler

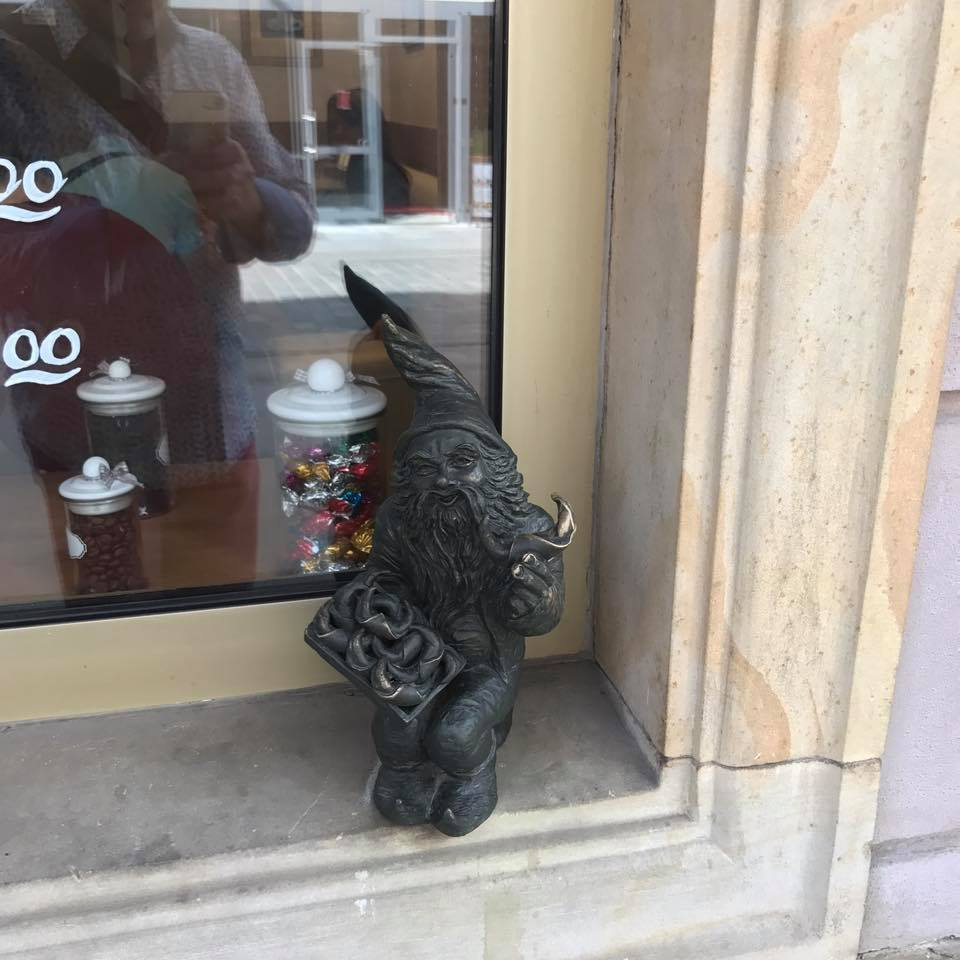
Croissant Eater

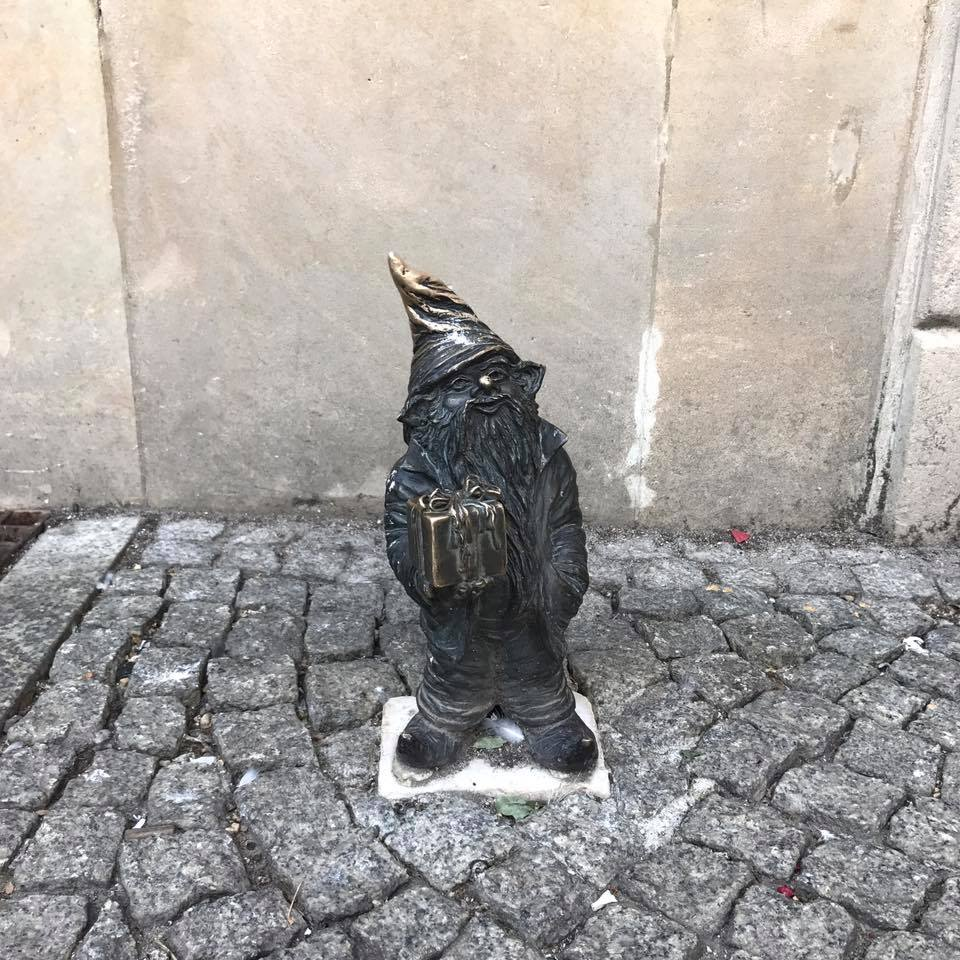
Souvenir Vendor

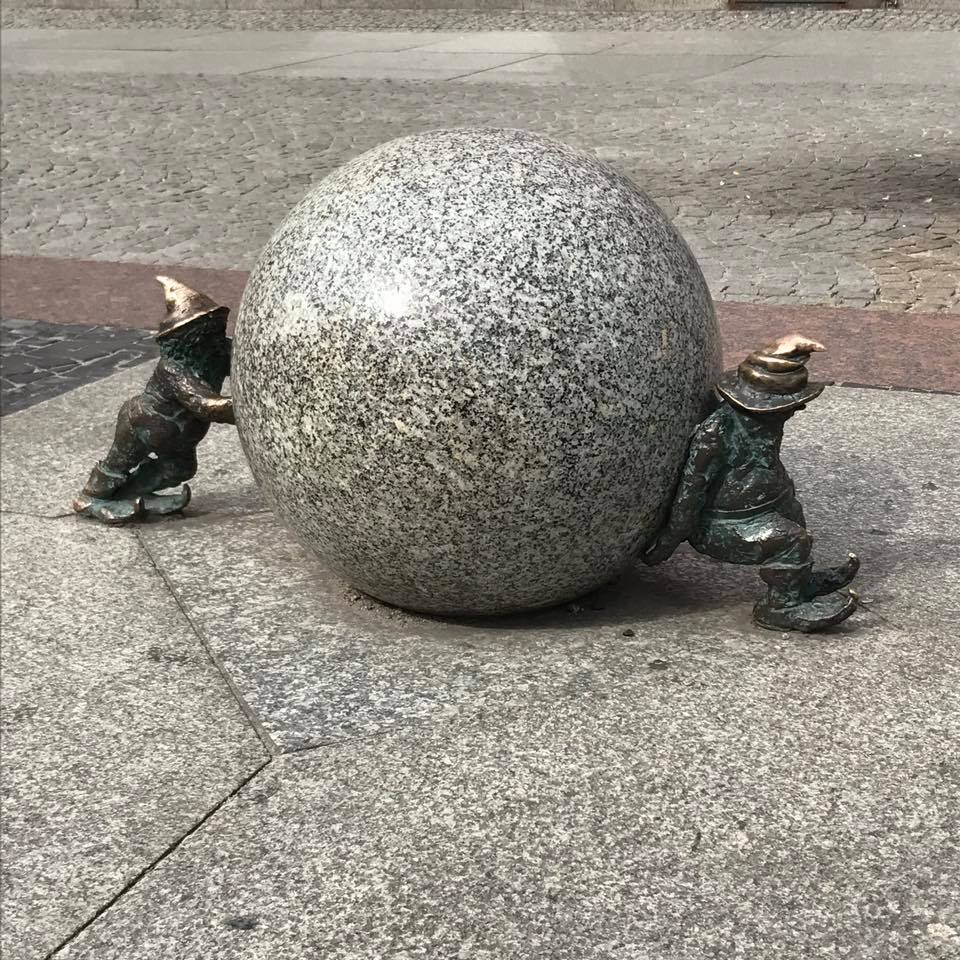
Sisyphuses

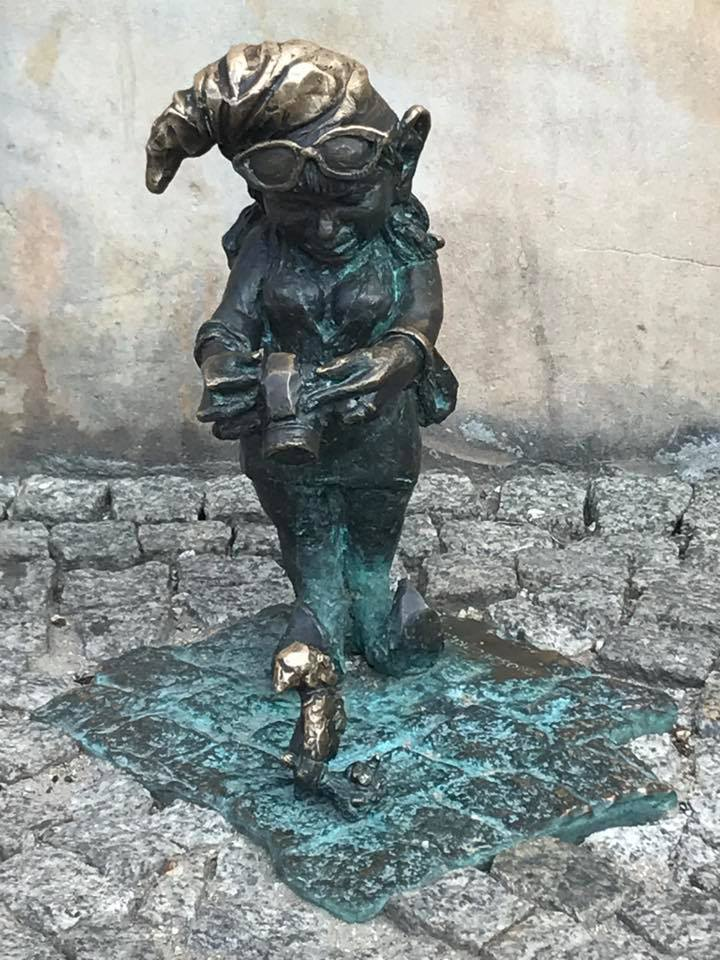
Troszka and Adoratorek

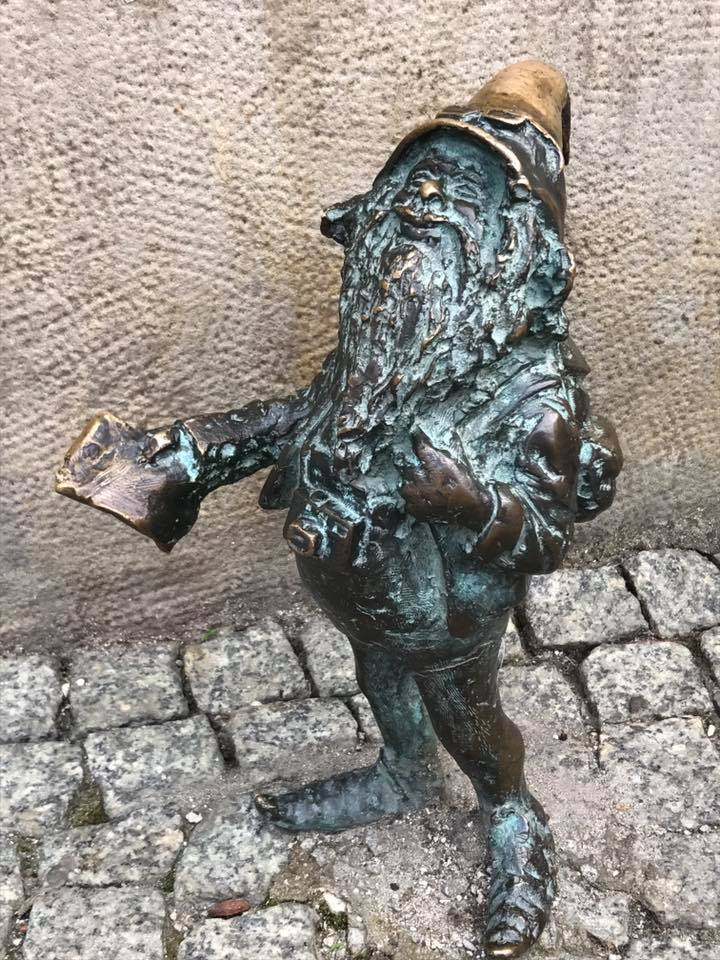
Tourist

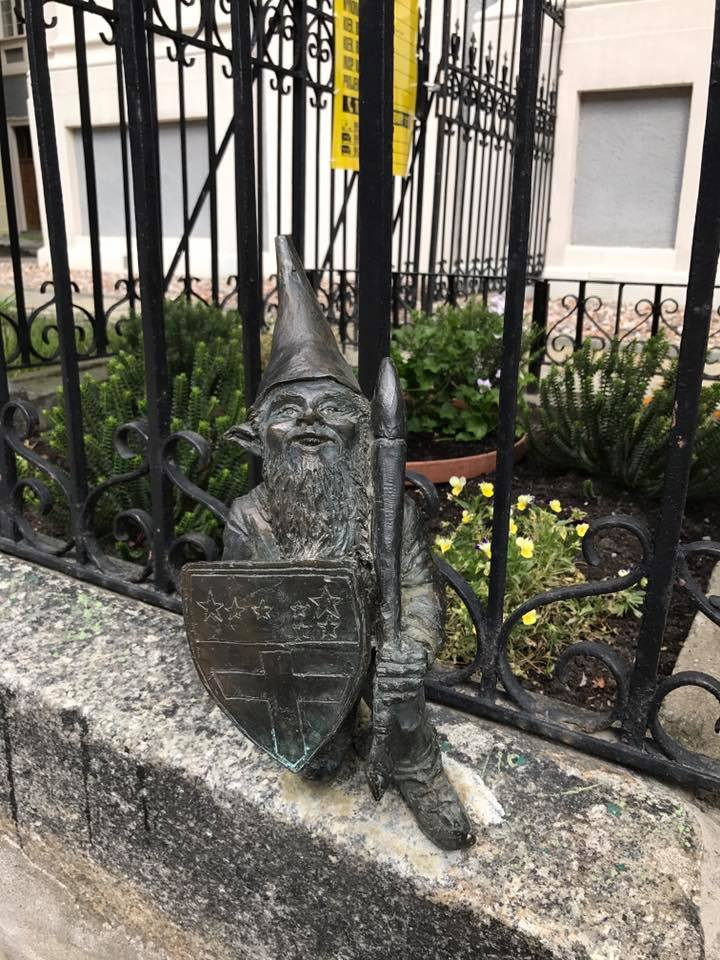
Ursus

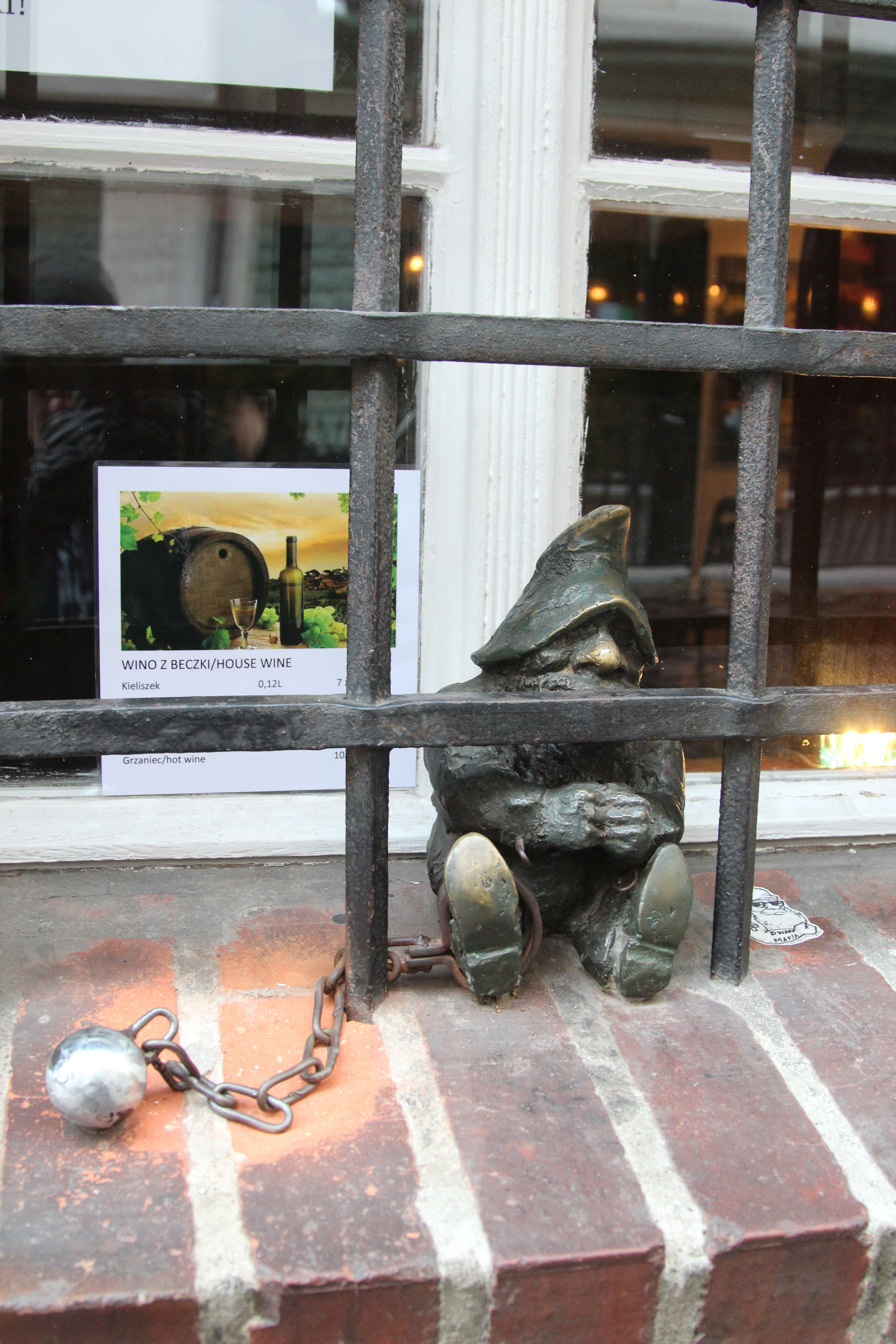
Prisoner

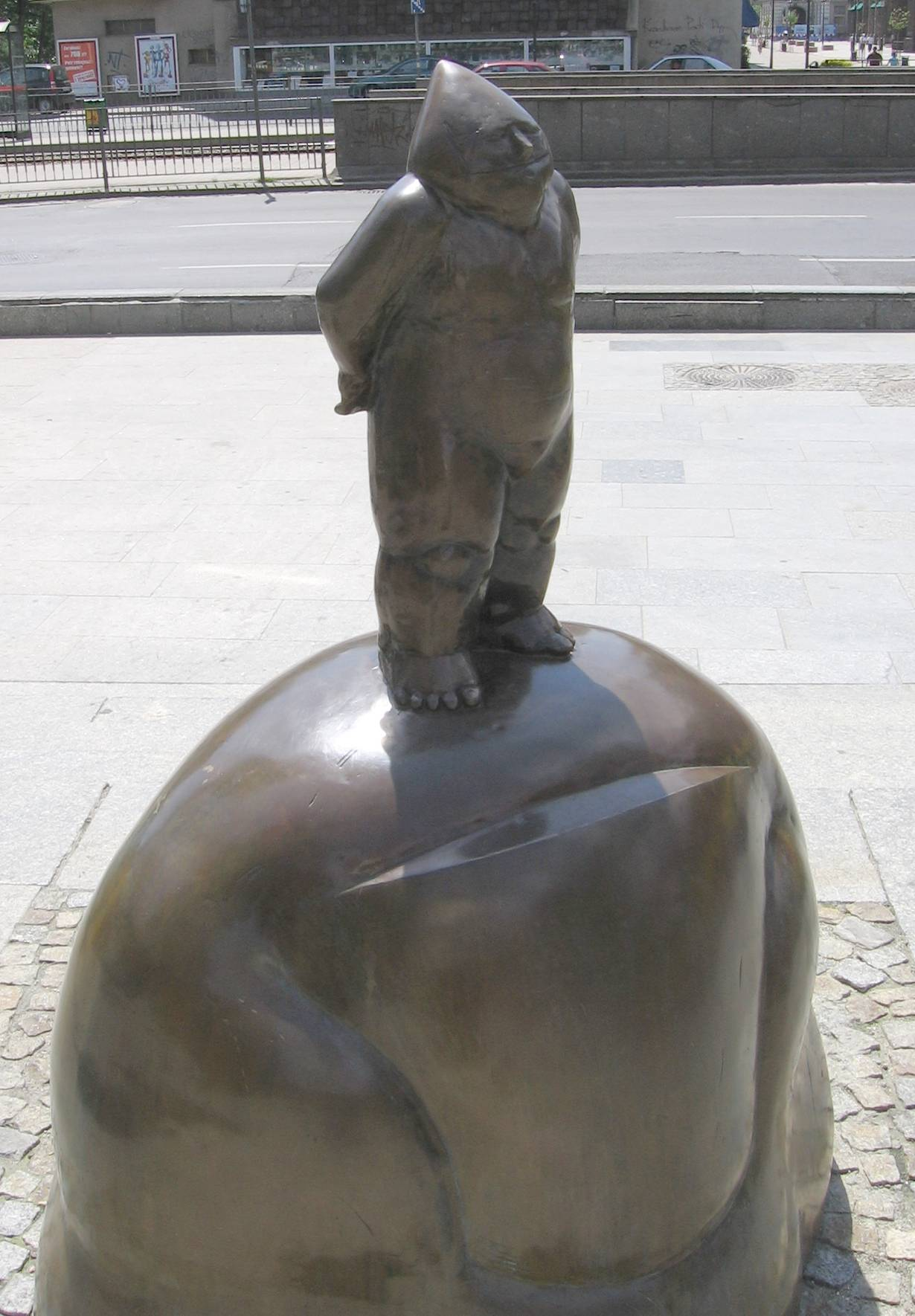
Papa Dwarf

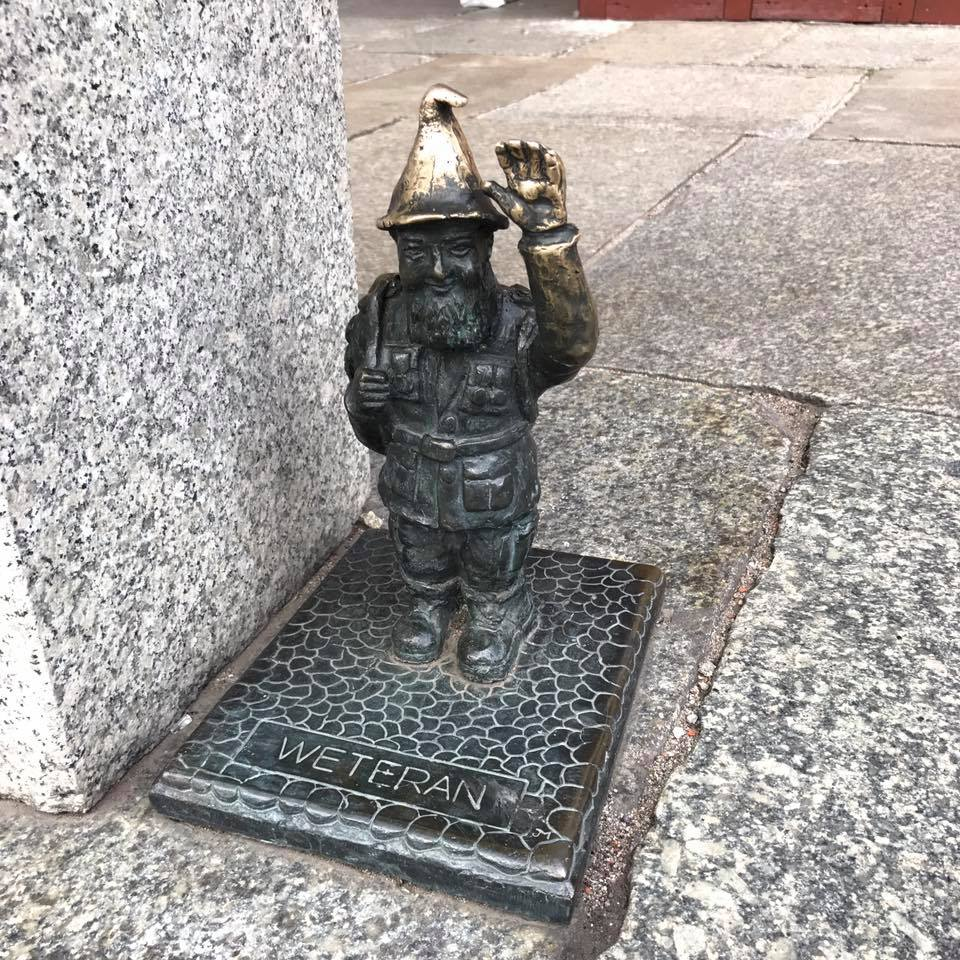
Veteran

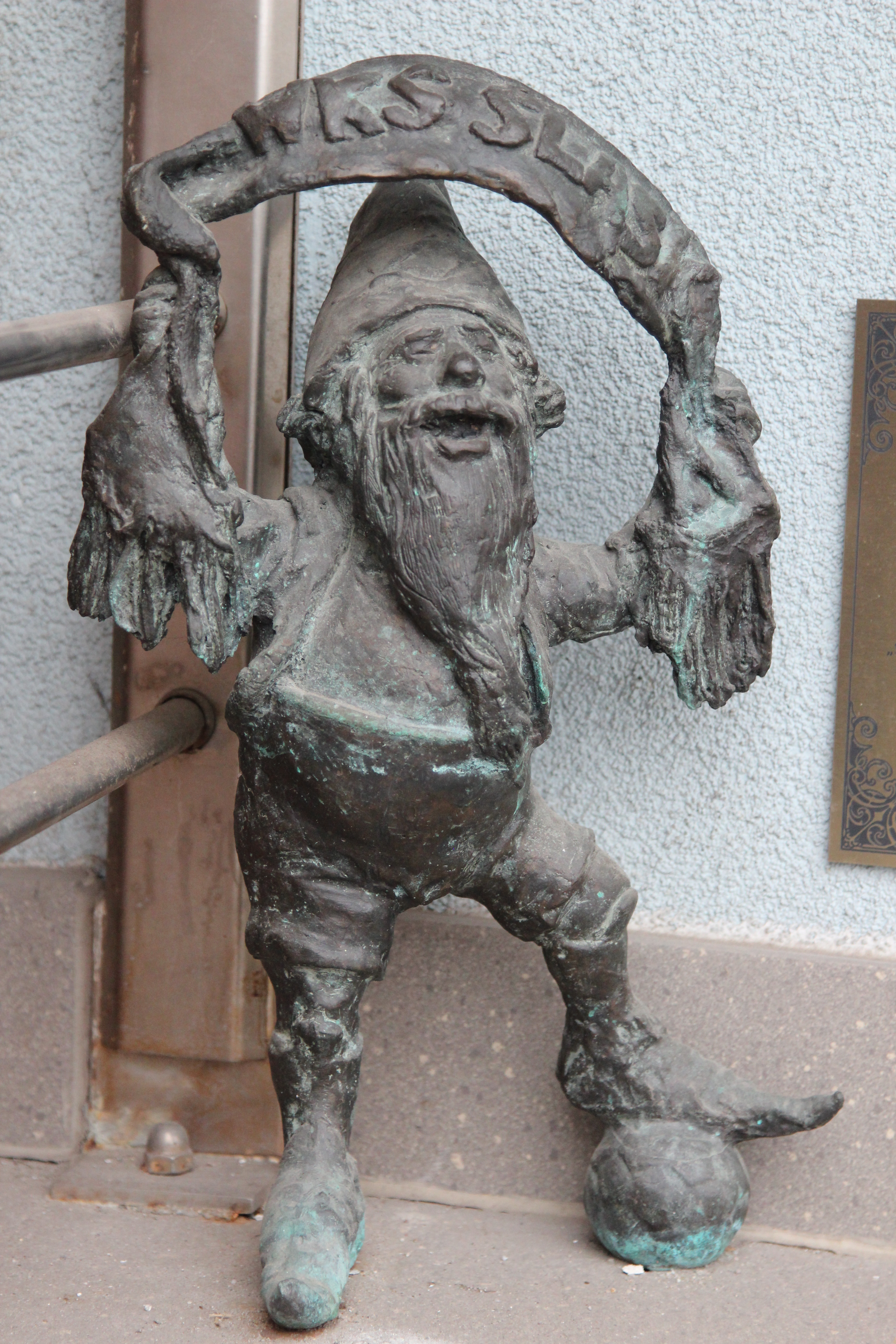
Fan of WKS Śląsk Wrocław

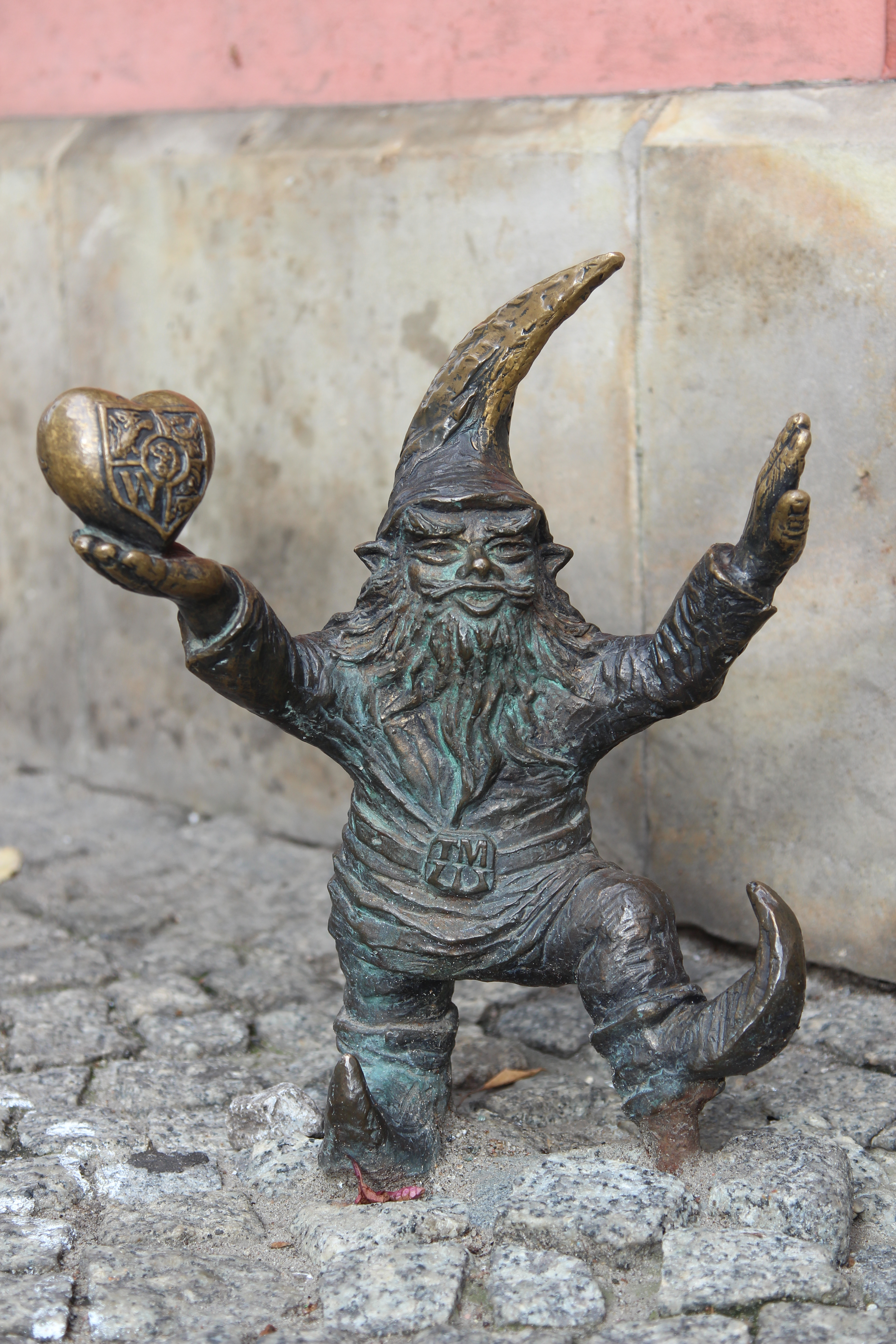
WrocLovek

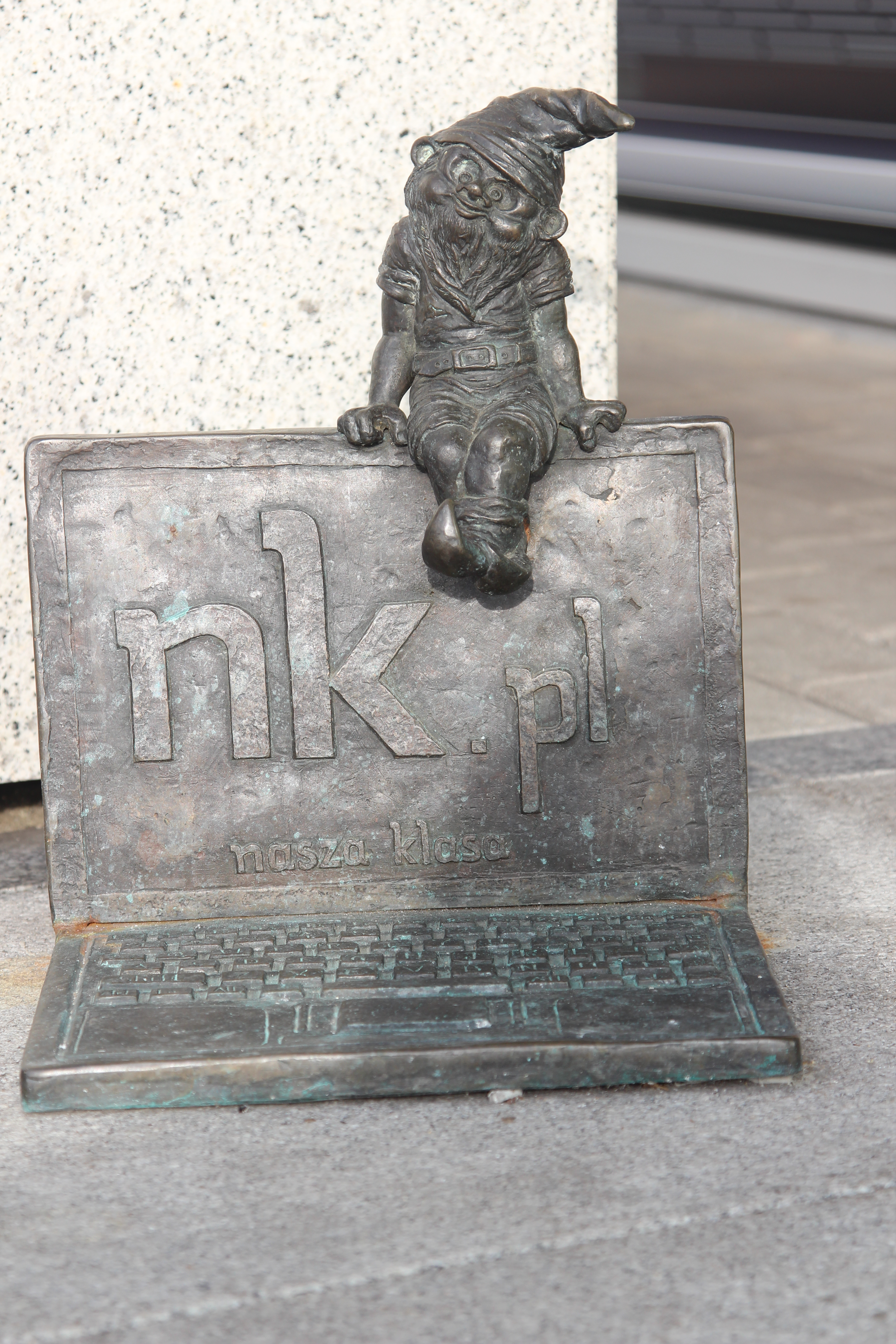
Wrocklik

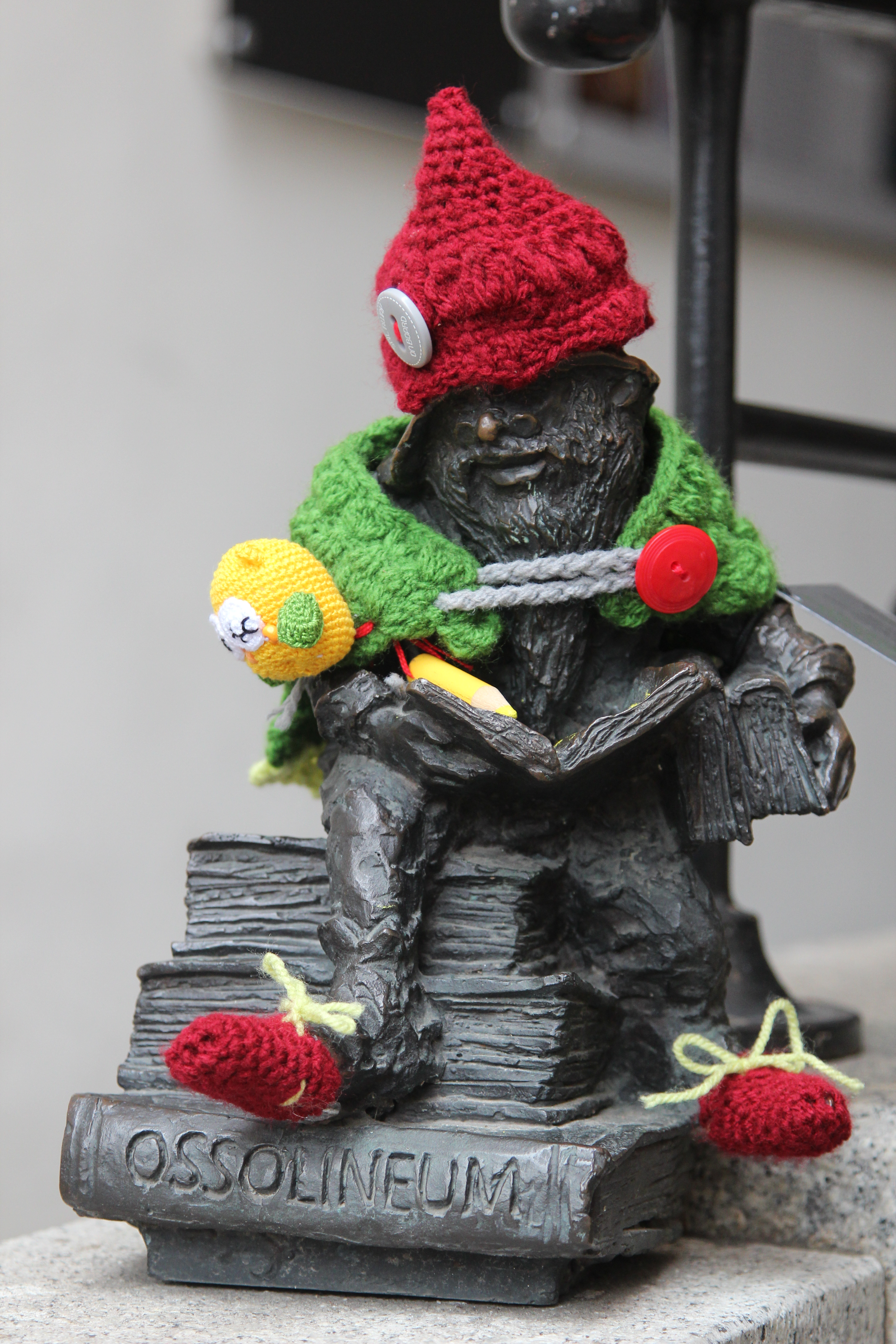
Wrocław dwarfs are bundled up during the winter.

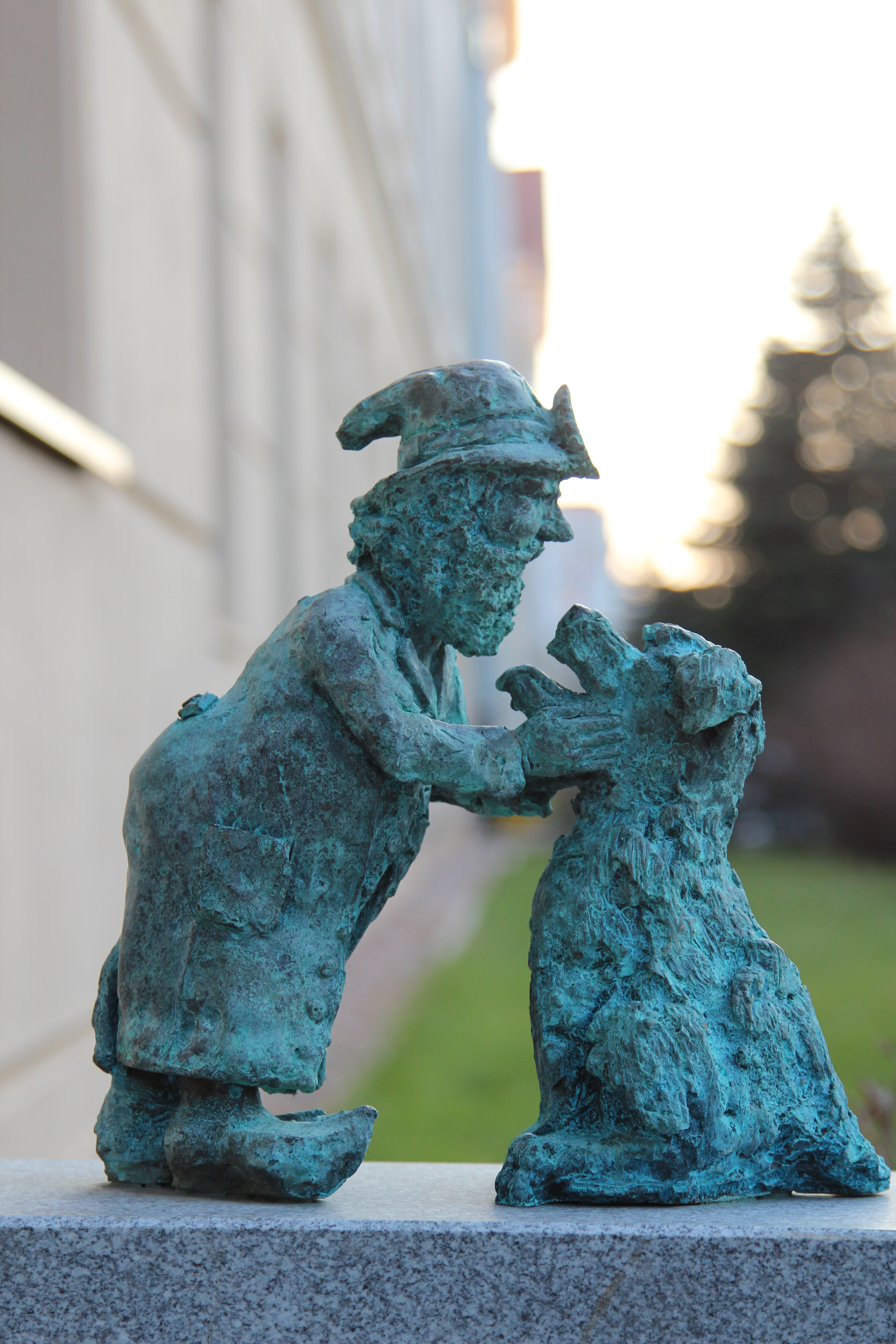
Roszek (Roch) the veterinarian

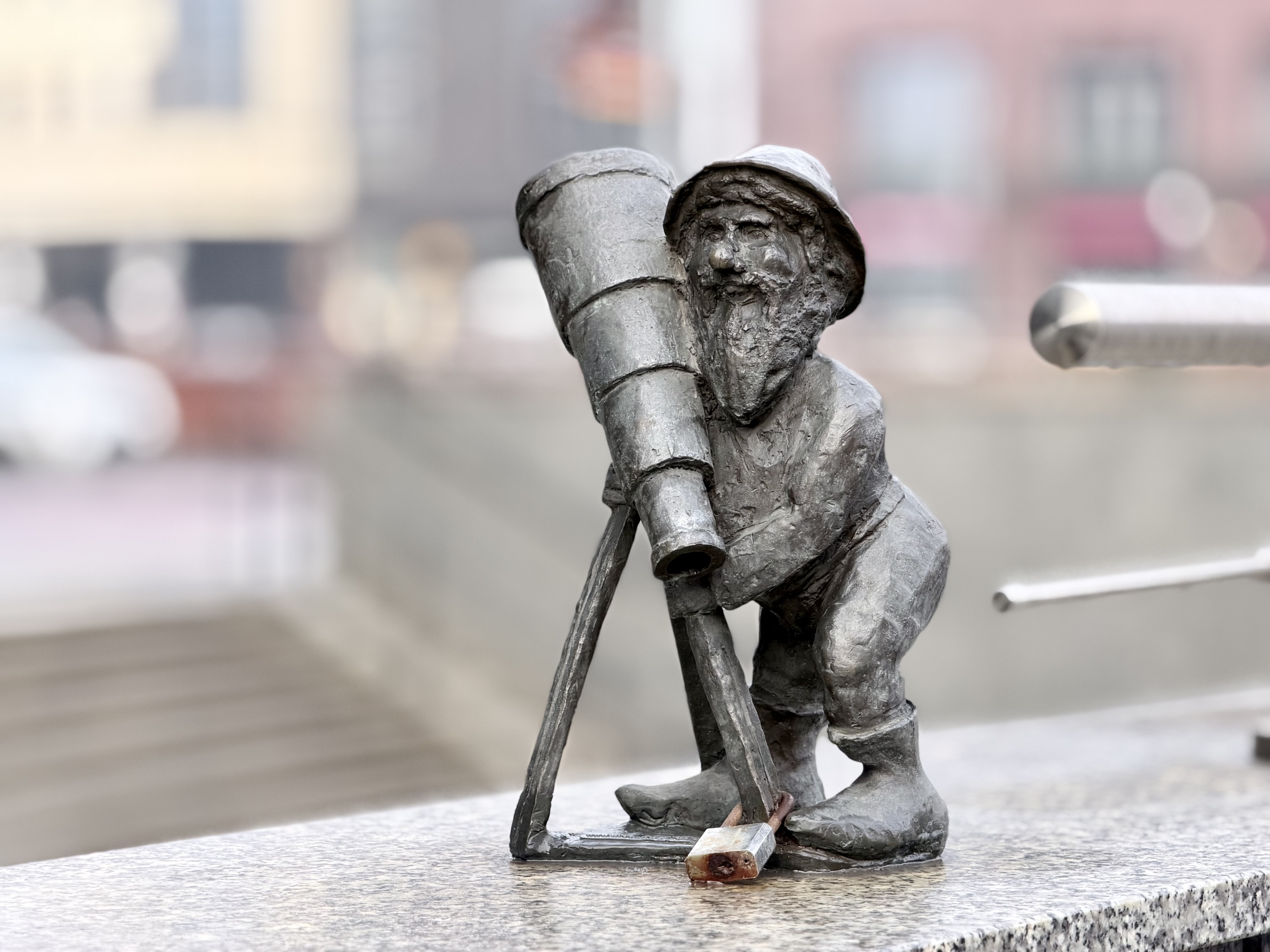
Lunetyk

== Wrocław Dwarfs in other cities ==
As a sign of friendship, sculptures of a dwarf are installed in Berlin, Kaunas, Oxford, and Lviv.

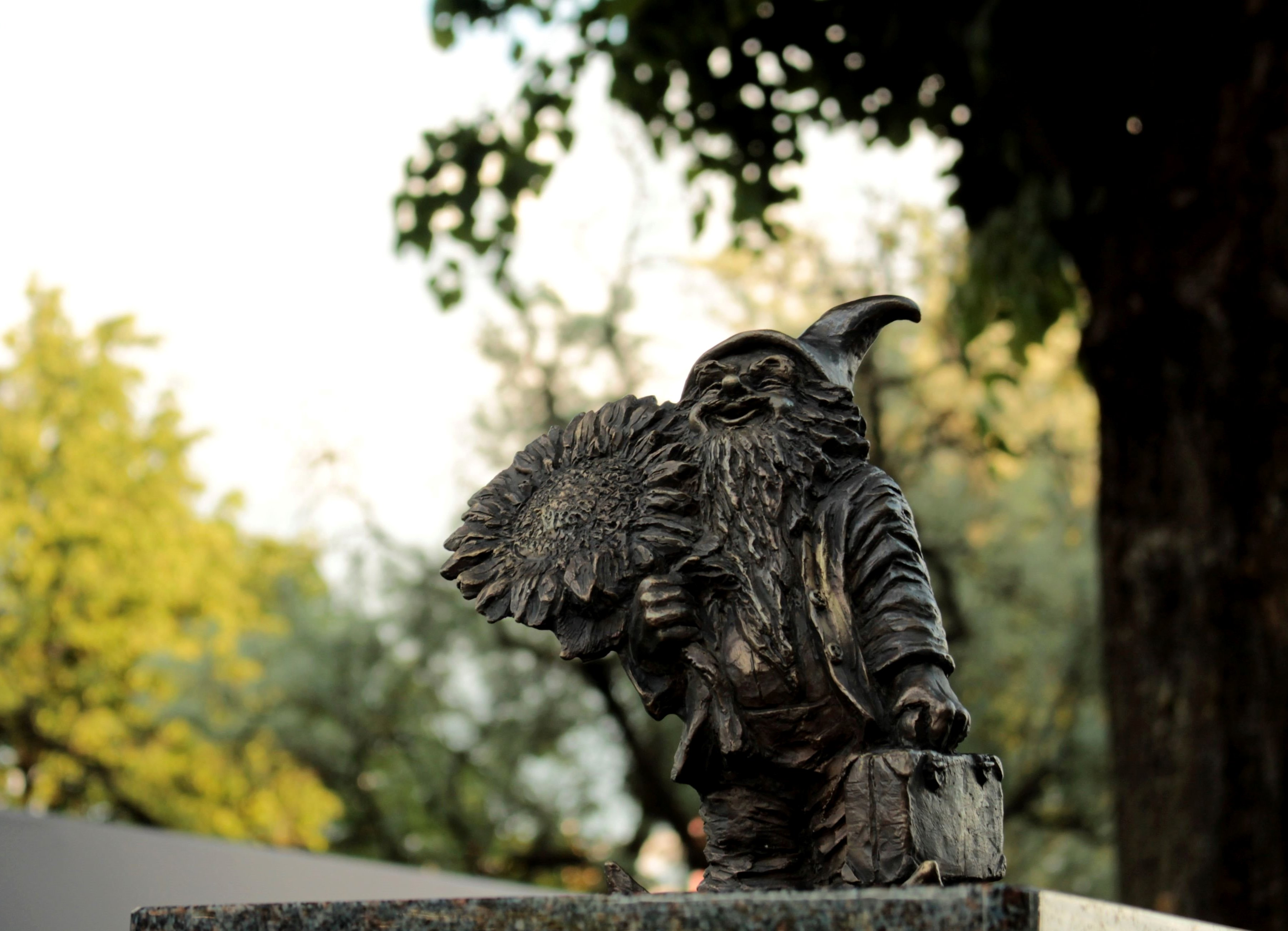
A dwarf 'visiting' Kaunas
