= List of culture jamming organizations and people =

This is a list of people and organisations that engage or have engaged in culture jamming. Culture jamming encompasses a wide range of activities. The group sociometry lists "flash mobs, media hoaxes, fake protests, building climbing, ad busting, and billboard liberation" as some examples. Memes, subvertising, and hacktivism are other common examples.

== Activist groups and people ==
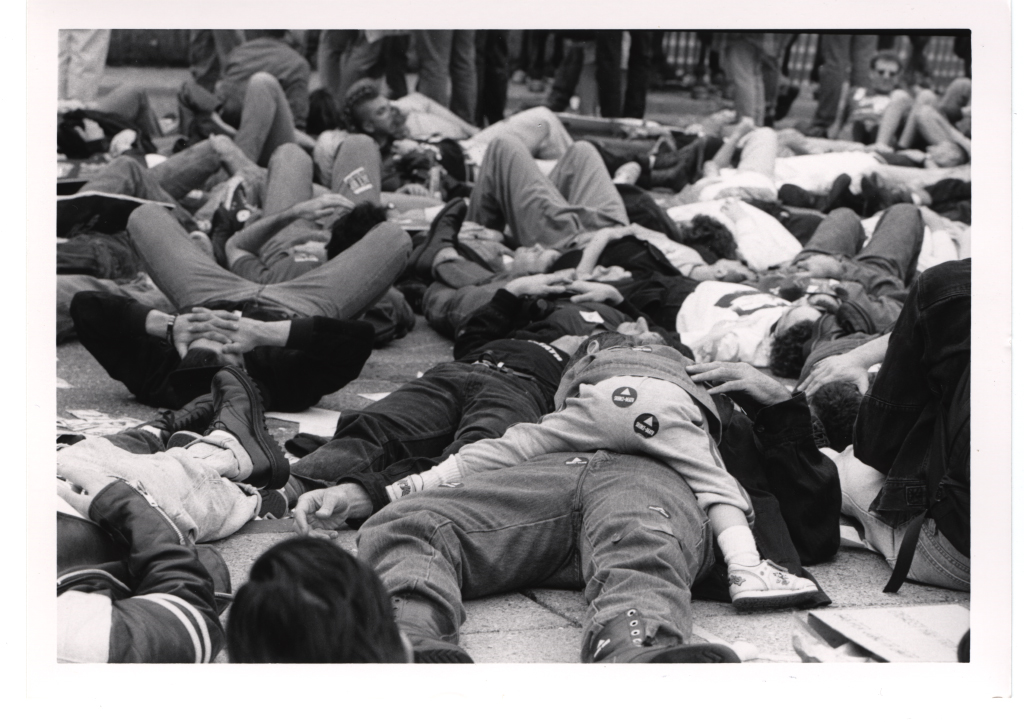
Die-in hosted by ACT UP in 1990

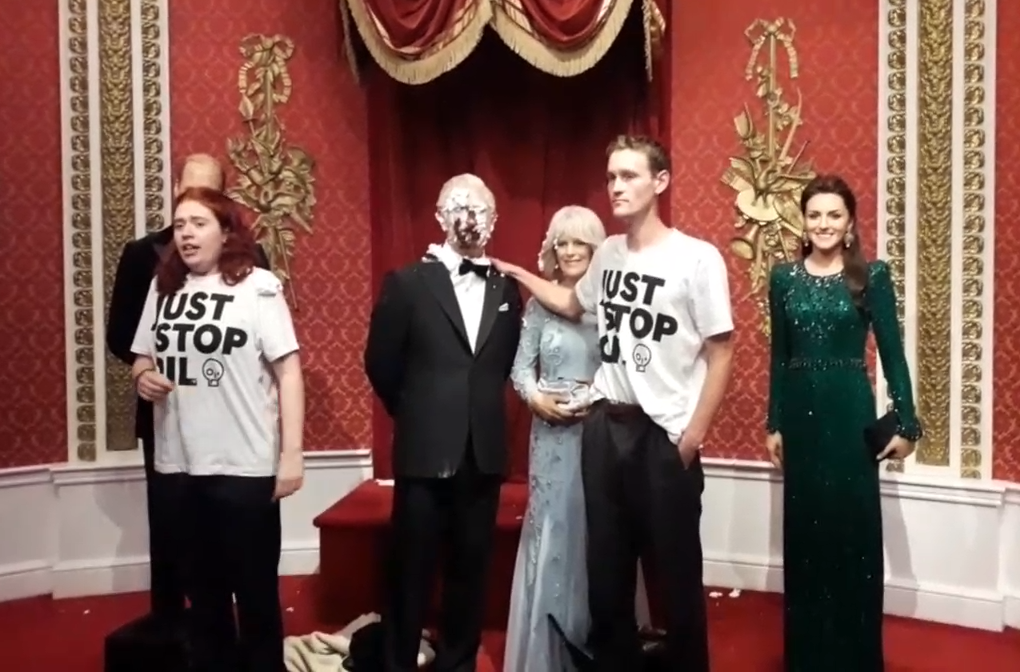
2022 Just Stop Oil protest at Madame Tussauds, where Prince Charles' wax model was smeared with cake

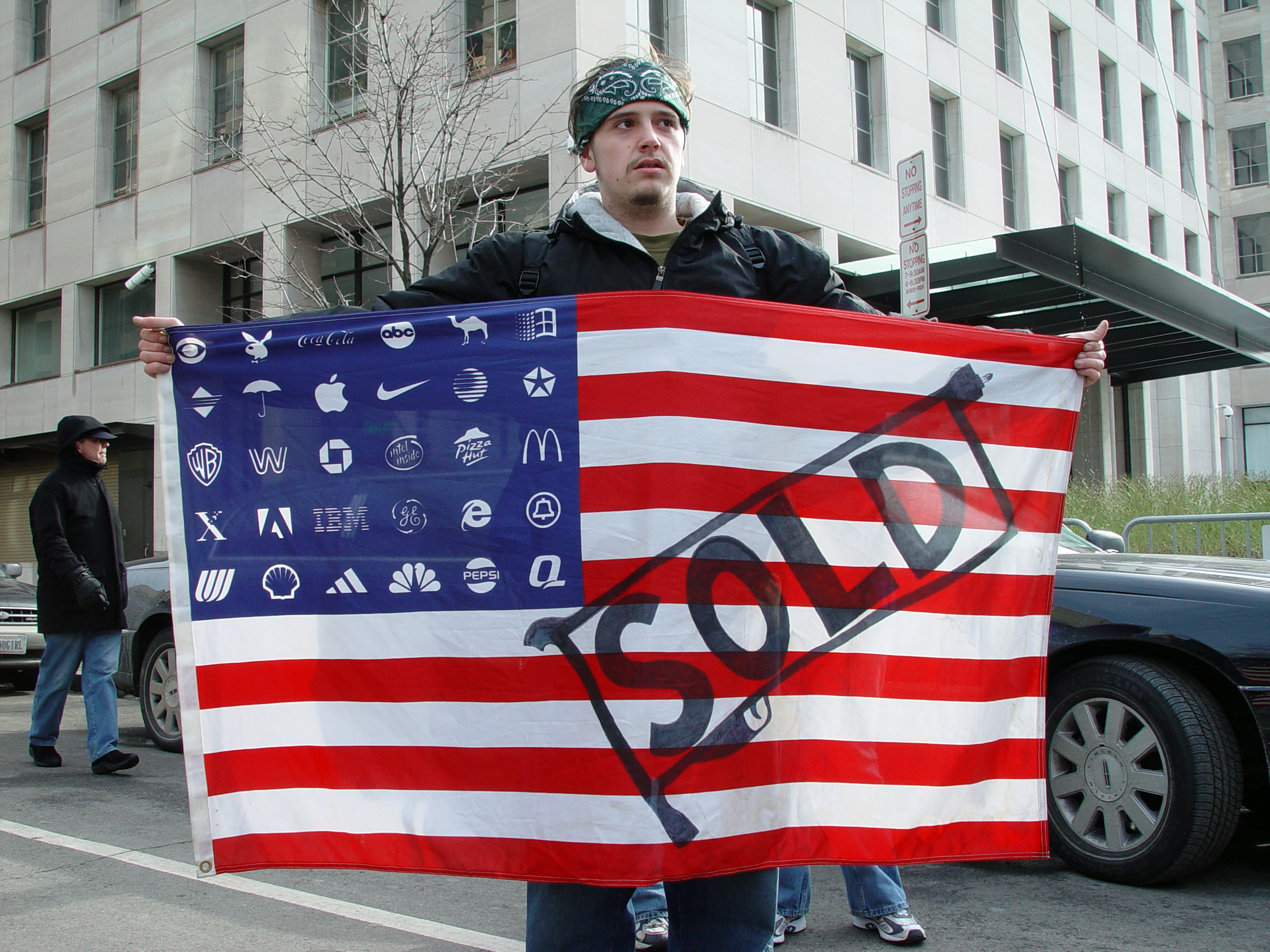
A protester holds an American flag with the stars replaced by corporate logos

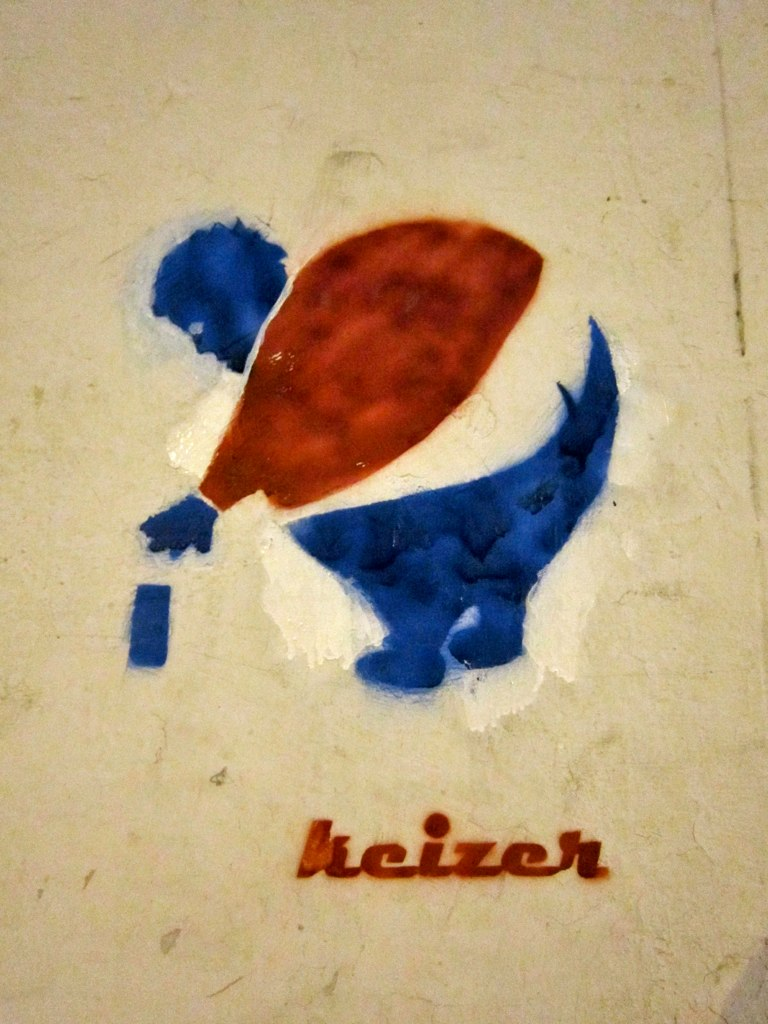
Anti-consumerist graffiti featuring the Pepsi logo

L.H.O.O.Q. by Marcel Duchamp, a "readymade" created in 1919, prior to the coining of the term "culture jamming"

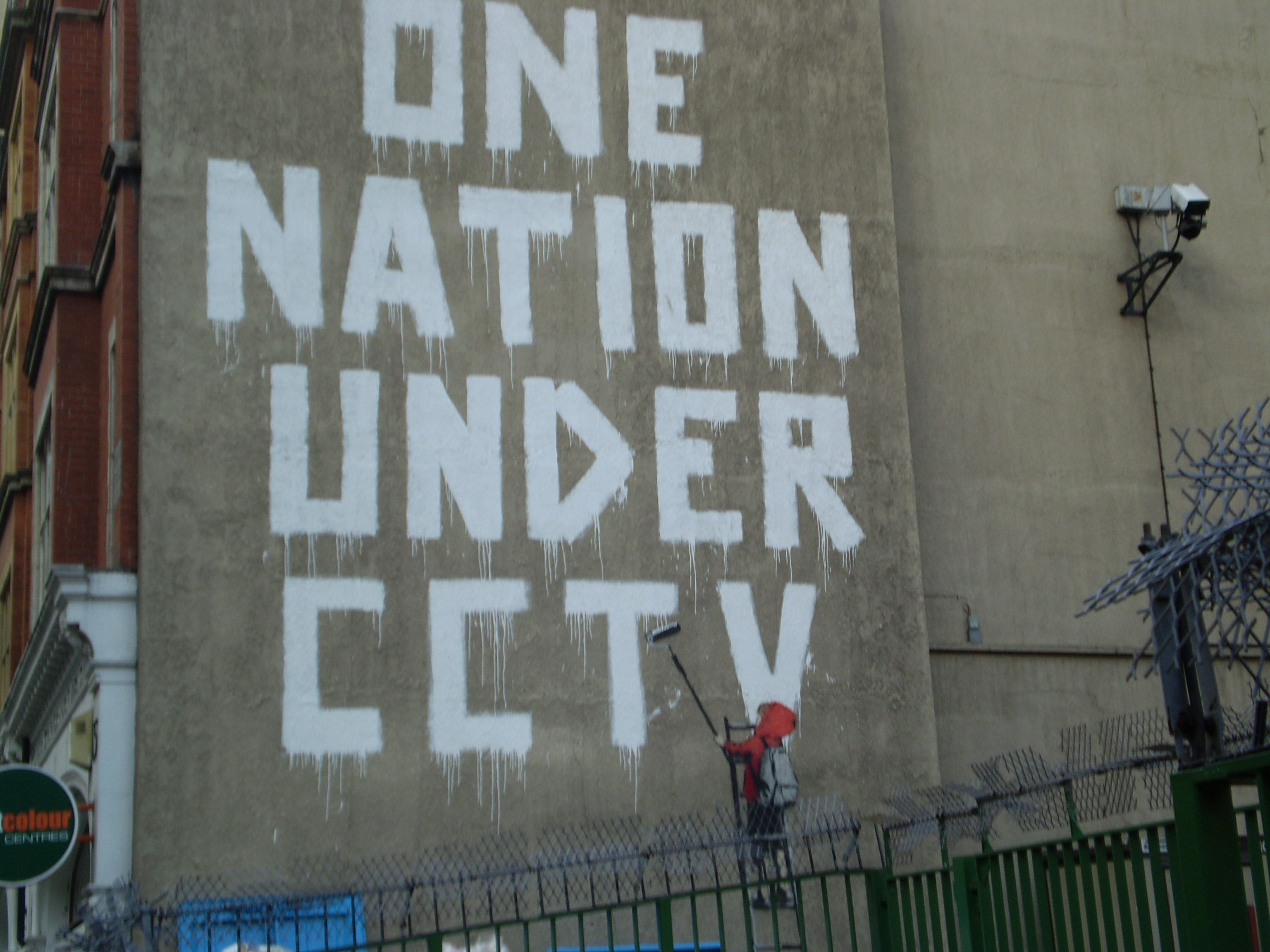
One Nation Under CCTV by Banksy (2008)

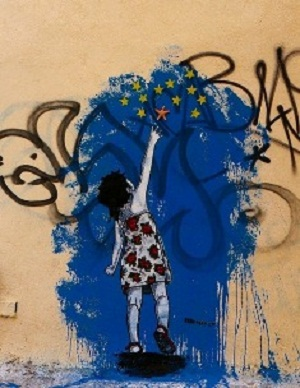
The Stars and the Starfish by Bleepsgr

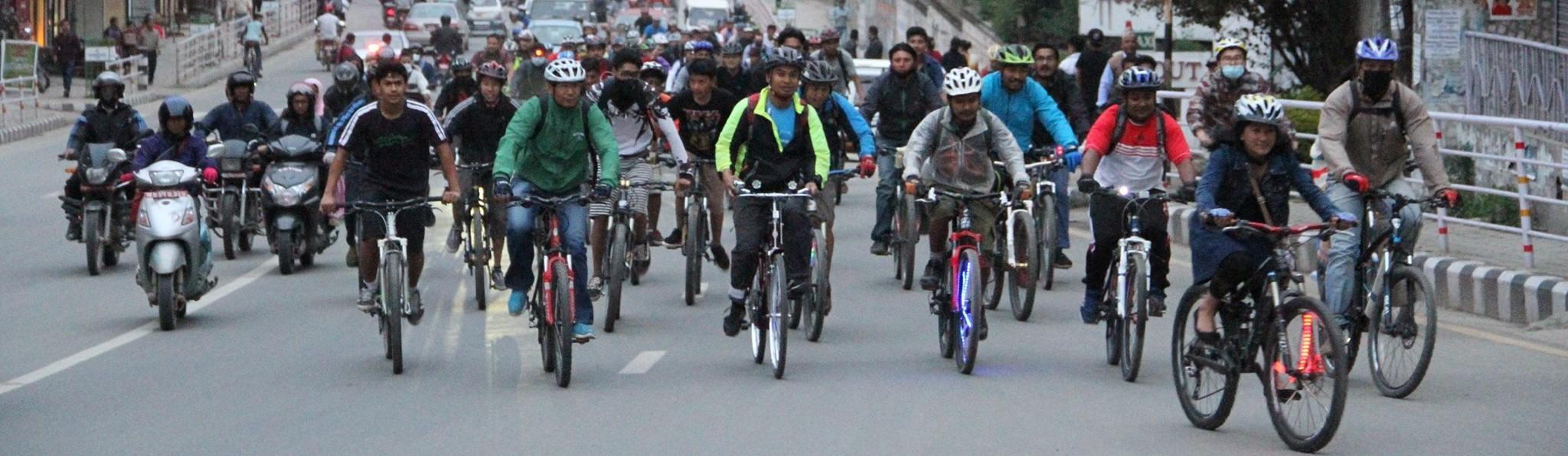
Critical Mass riders in Nepal

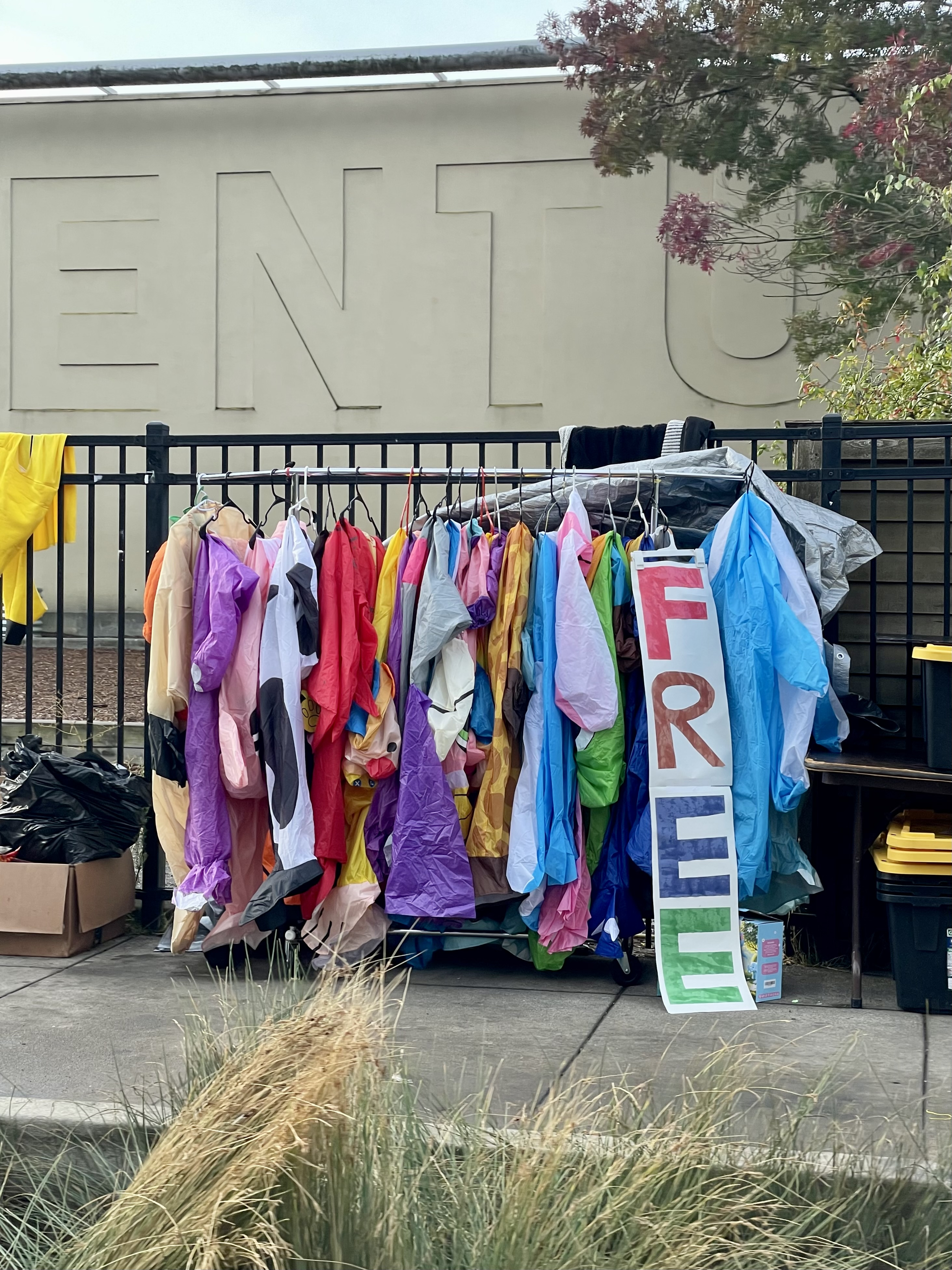
Free costumes outside a protest location as part of Operation Inflation

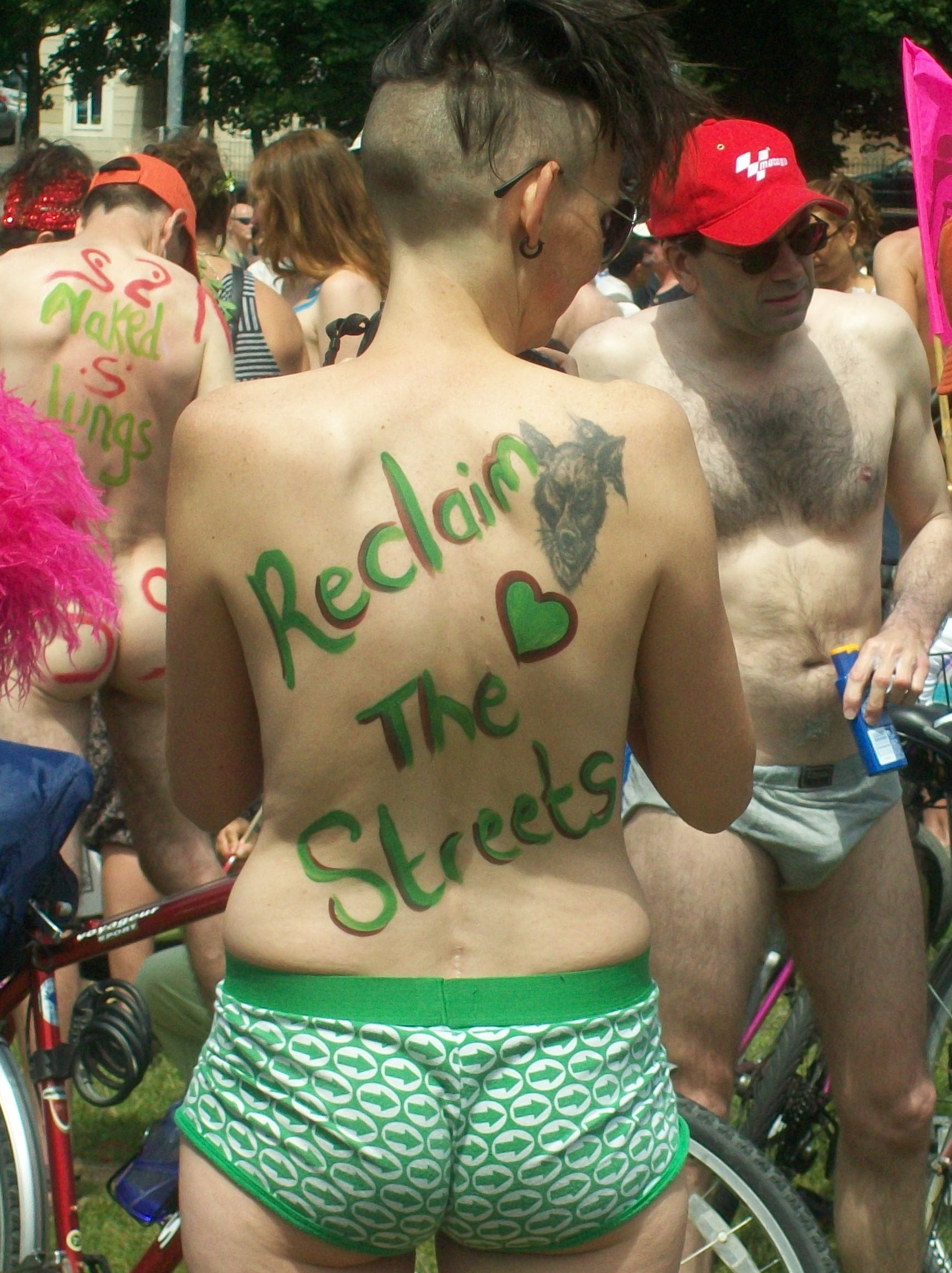
Participant in a Reclaim the Streets naked bike ride

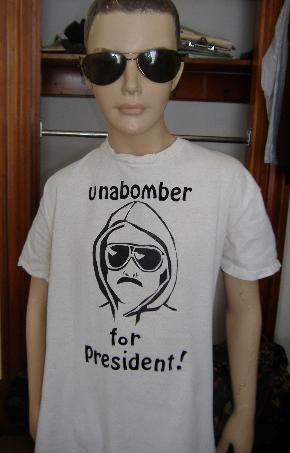
Unabomber for President tee shirt

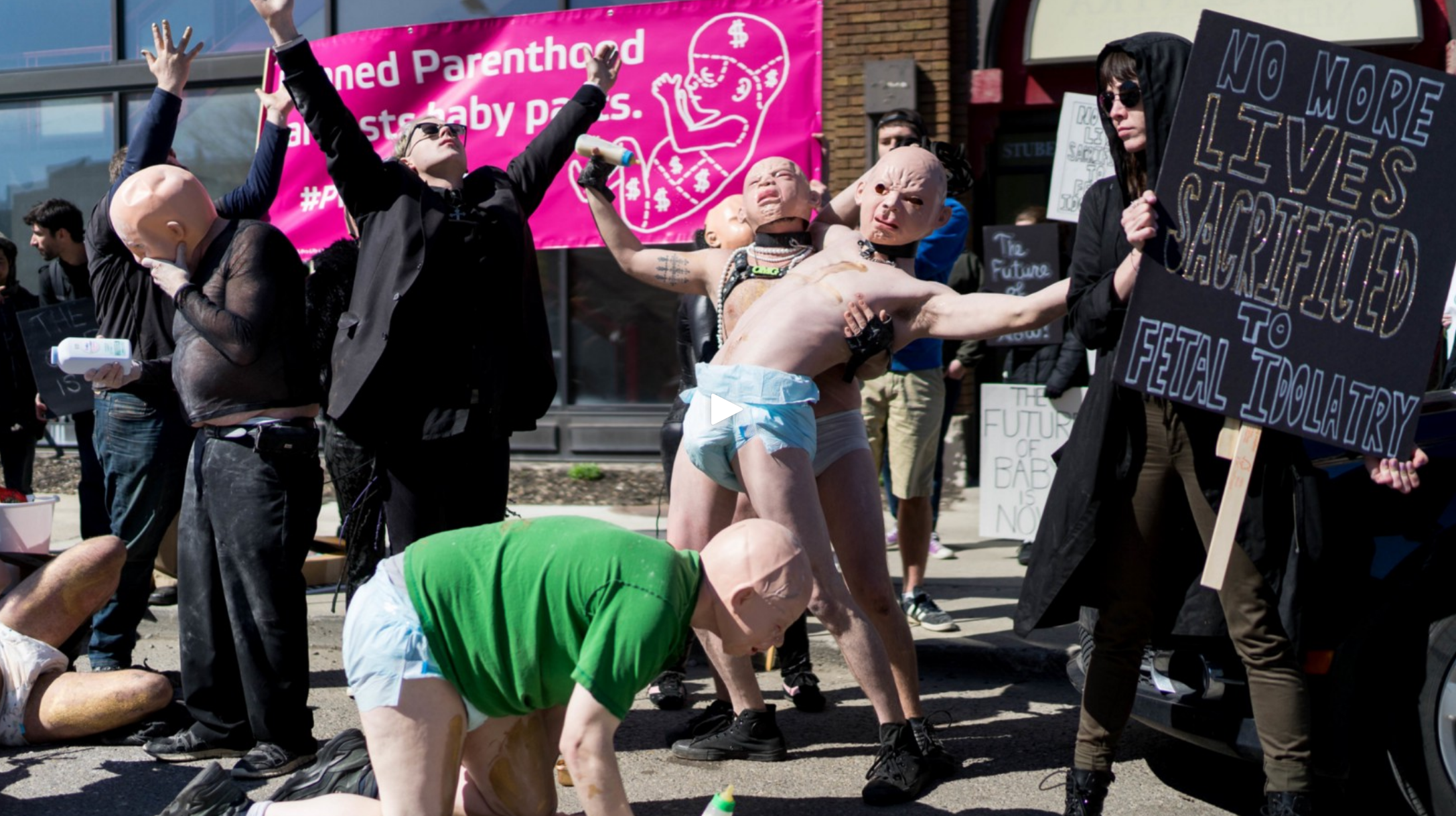
The Satanic Temple's Future of Baby is Now protest

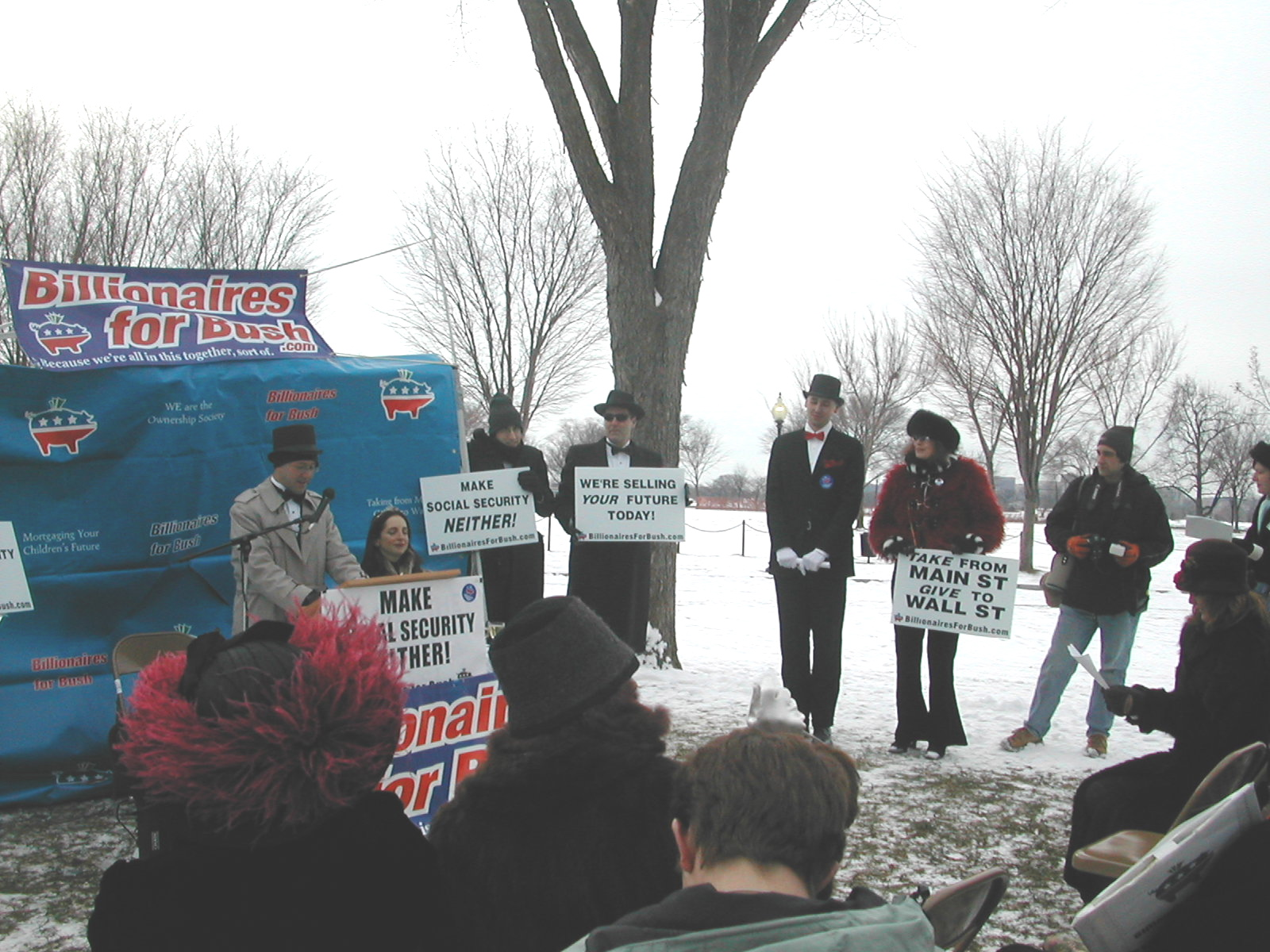
Billionaires for Bush Social Security Auciton event

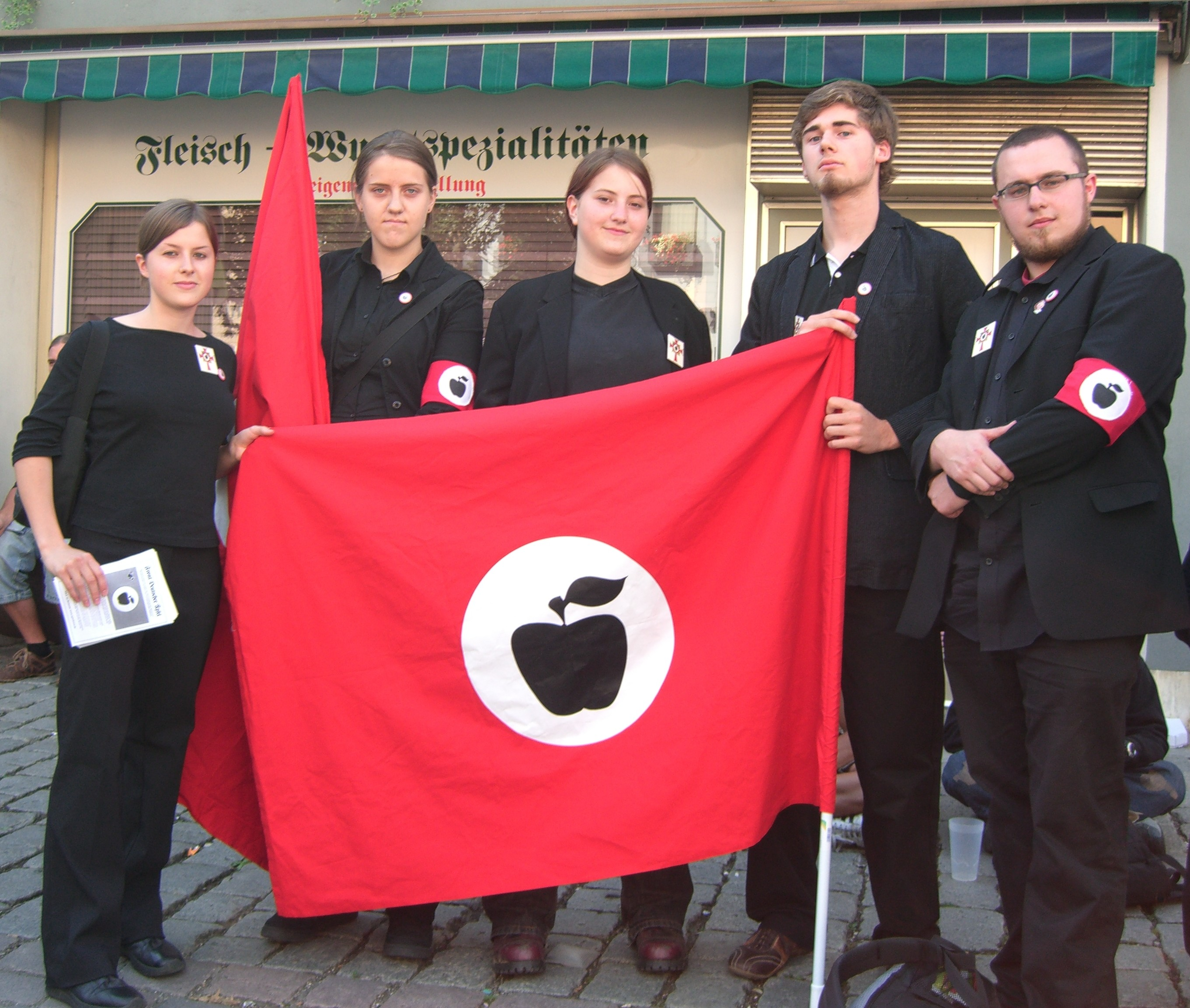
Members of German Apples Front pose with their flag

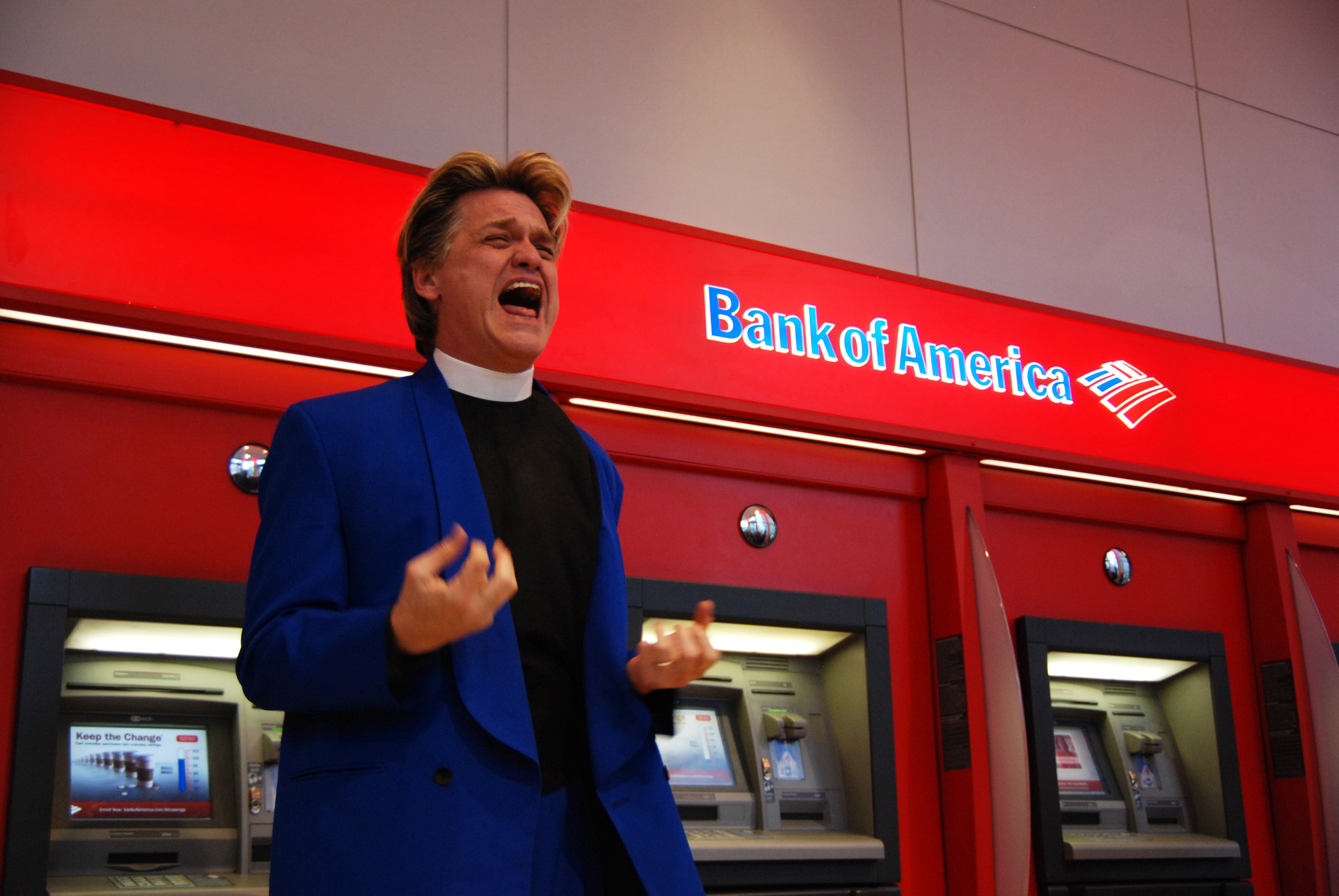
Reverend Billy preaching in front of Bank of America

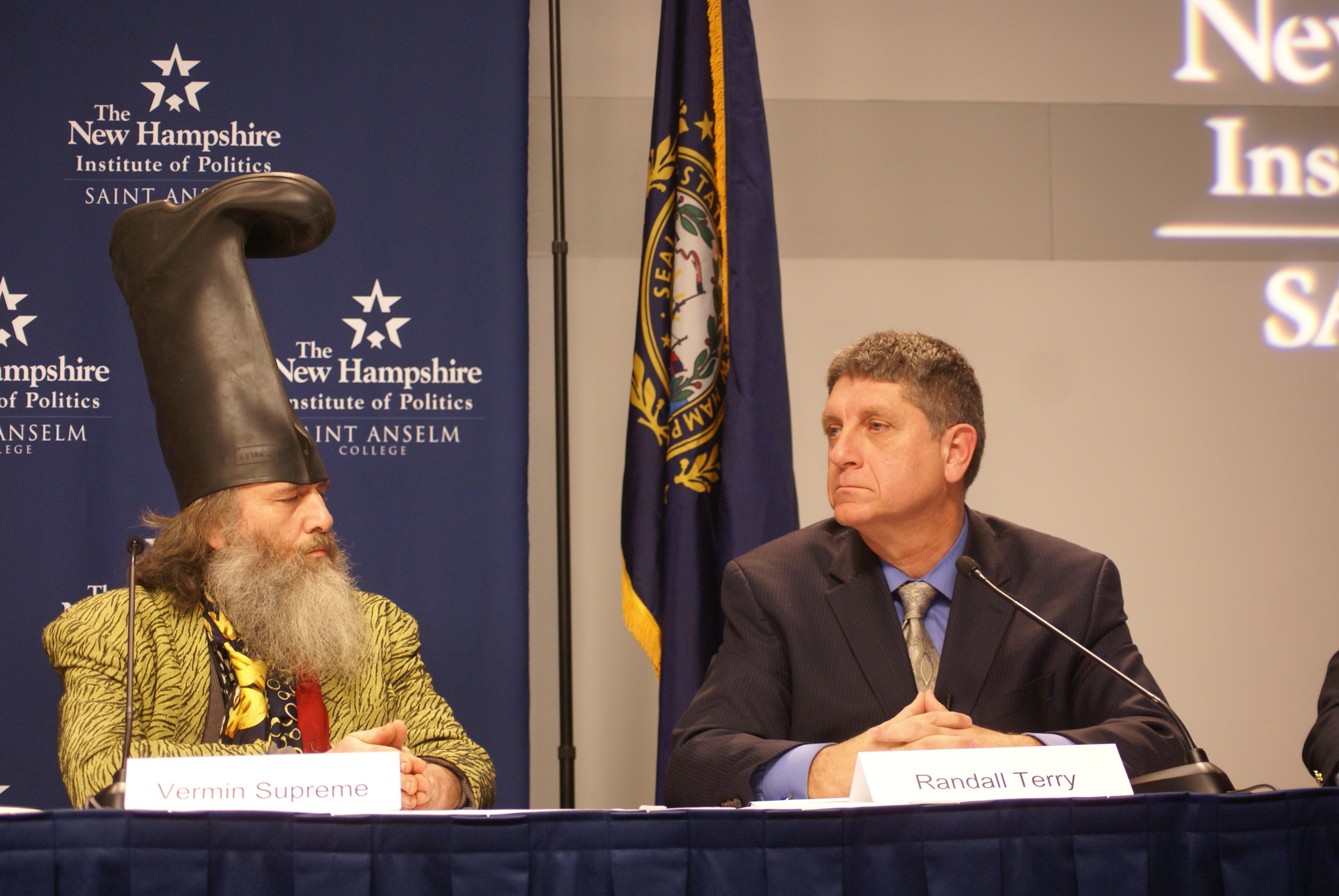
Vermin Supreme and Randall Terry speaking at New Anselm College

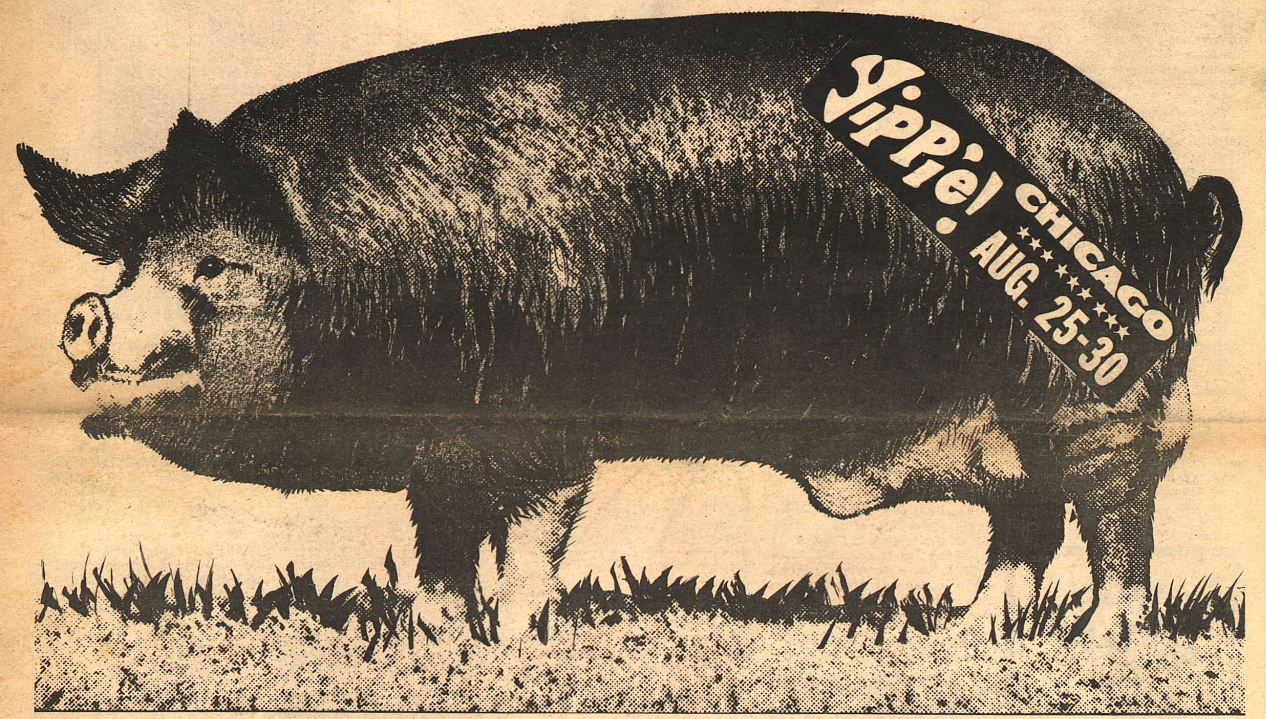
Pigasus, the pig the Yippies nominated for president in 1968

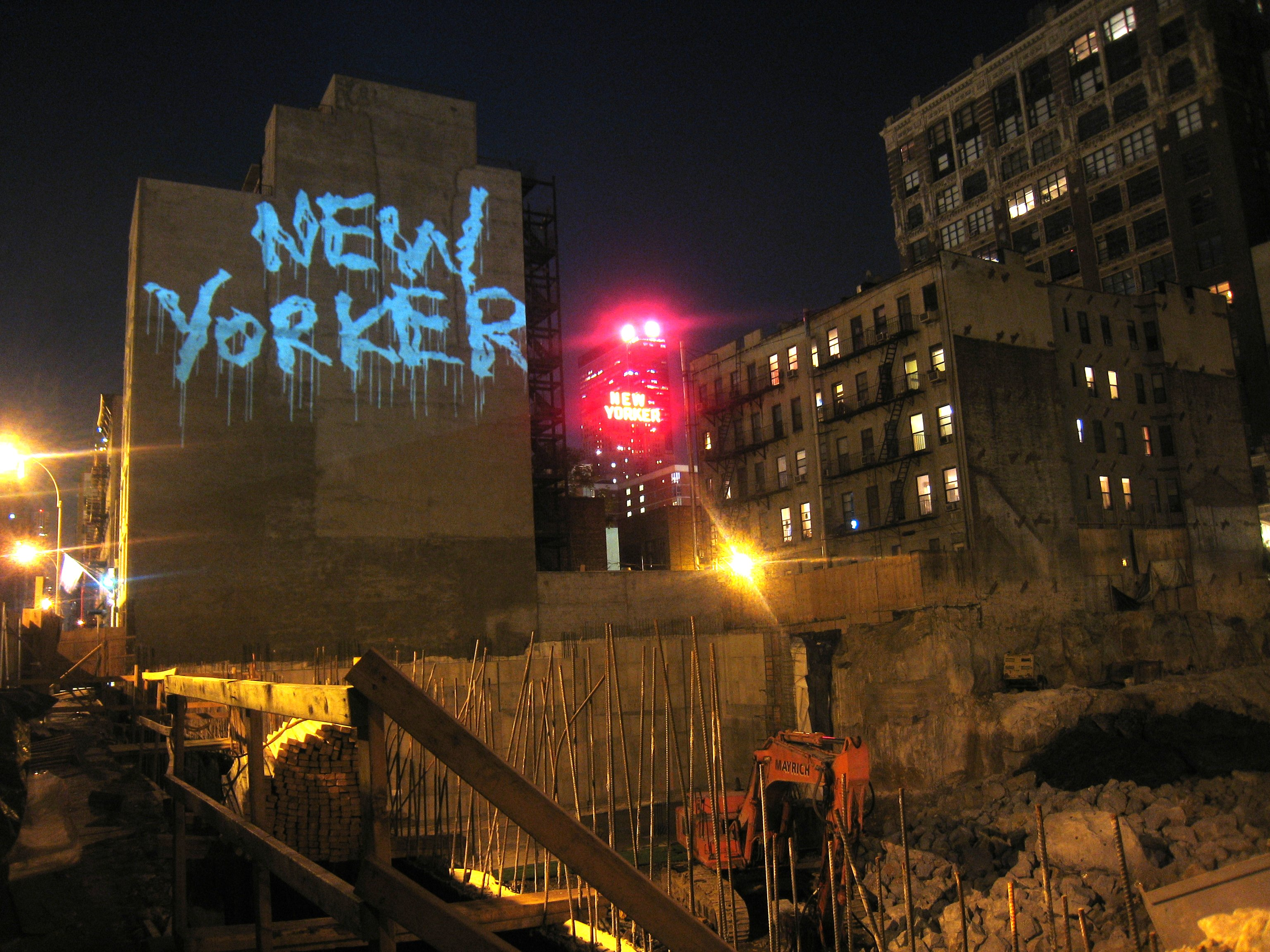
Graffiti using LED lights by the Graffiti Research Lab

- ACT UP, AIDS activist group that used "attention-getting stunts, graphics, and sound bites" to gain publicity for the AIDS epidemic
- Anonymous, international hactivist collective
- Clandestine Insurgent Rebel Clown Army, British activist group that used clowning to supplement their protests
- CODEPINK, American anti-war organisation
- Earth First!, American radical environmental organisation
- Feminist Anti-War Resistance, Russian activist group
- Just Stop Oil, British environmental activist group
- Ofog − Direkt aktion för fred, Swedish anti-nuclear and anti-militarism group that utilises clowning
- Peng Collective, German activist group
- Queer Nation, American LGBTQ organisation
- Résistance à l'agression publicitaire, French anti-advertisement organisation
- Situationist International, European social revolutionary group
- Space Hijackers, English activist group

== Anarchist groups ==
- CrimethInc., international anarchist collective
- Noisebridge, American anarchist hackerspace

== Art collectives ==
- ®™ark, anti-consumerism art collective
- Barbie Liberation Organization, American artist-activists known for changing the voiceboxes in several hundred Teen Talk Barbies
- Brandalism, British art collective
- Cacophony Society, American organisation that created Burning Man and Santarchy
- Chim-Pom, Japanese art collective
- CutUP Collective, British art collective
- Gran Fury, American art collective of AIDS activists that spun off from ACT UP
- Guerrilla Girls, American feminist art collective
- The Illuminator Art Collective, American art collective known for projecting political messages onto buildings
- INDECLINE, American anarchist art collective
- monochrom, international creative group
- Newmindspace, North American arts collective
- Nsumi, American arts collective
- subRosa, cyberfeminist art collective
- Suohpanterror, Sámi art and activist group
- Temporary Services, American art group
- TrustoCorp, American art group
- Ztohoven, Czech art collective

== Business ==
- Ji Lee, Korean-Brazilian advertising executive and designer known for The Bubble Project, where he added speech bubble stickers to ads in New York City for the public to fill in
- Jonah Peretti, American entrepreneur and co-founder of Buzzfeed and HuffPost

== Campaigns and tactics ==
- Buy Nothing Day, an annual anti-consumerism protest on Black Friday, promoted by Adbusters
- Critical Mass, an originally Swedish/American protest collective that involves a large amount of cyclists riding together, often blocking traffic but making the act of cycling safer by doing so
- English Disco Lovers, English Google bombing campaign in 2012 that aimed to replace the English Defence League as the top search result for "EDL"
- Kampanjen mot verneplikt, Norwegian campaign against conscription
- No Pants Subway Ride, international event where participants ride rapid transit without trousers on
- Operation Inflation, American movement of protesters wearing inflatable costumes, such as the Portland Frog, during anti-ICE protests
- Reclaim the Streets, protest collective started in England that turns busy streets into a social space, blocking traffic for an undetermined amount of time while participants dance, socialize, eat, and play music
- Stop Tony Meow, defunct browser extension that replaced pictures of Australian PM Tony Abbott with pictures of kittens
- StreetWars, international water gun assassination tournament based on the game Assassin
- truth, anti-tobacco campaign by the American Legacy Foundation
- TV Turnoff Week, an anti-consumerism protest meant to decrease the number of ads consumed by viewers; promoted by Adbusters
- Unabomber for President, American political campaign in the mid-1990s
- Whirl-Mart, American anti-consumerism campaign wherein protesters slowly push trolleys around stores for an undetermined amount of time, not buying anything and frustrating other shoppers
- World Naked Bike Ride, international naked bike ride
- Yomango, anti-consumerism campaign started in Spain
- You Stink, Lebanese movement

== Film and television ==
- Muntadhar al-Zaidi, Iraqi broadcast journalist who threw his shoes at US President George W. Bush during a 2008 press conference
- Brass Eye, British satirical news program
- Sacha Baron Cohen, English comedian and satirist, perhaps best known for his role as Ali G and Borat
- Stephen Colbert, American comedian and political commentator known for The Colbert Report and The Late Show with Stephen Colbert
- Deep Dish Television, American public-access television network
- Johannes Grenzfurthner, Austrian documentarian and artist
- Nathan for You, American satirical reality show, notable for Dumb Starbucks and Summit Ice Apparel
- Paper Tiger Television, American public-access television network
- Filip Remunda, Czech filmmaker and artist known for creating a fake hypermarket in 2003
- Morgan Spurlock, American filmmaker
- Jon Stewart, American satirist and political commentator best known for The Daily Show with Jon Stewart
- Mark Thomas, English comedian
- Bassem Youssef, Egyptian comedian

== Music and audio ==
- Antediluvian Rocking Horse, Australian audio project
- Jello Biafra, singer (formerly of Dead Kennedys) and political activist
- Crass, English punk rock band
- The Disposable Heroes of Hiphoprisy, American hip-hop music ensemble
- The Evolution Control Committee, American experimental music band
- Gorillaz, English virtual band
- The KLF, British electronic band
- John Lydon, English musician of Public Image Ltd and, formerly, the Sex Pistols
- Meadow House, English musician
- M.I.A., Sri Lankan-British rapper
- Negativland, American alternative band
- John Oswald, Canadian composer known for his plunderphonics
- Over the Edge, American sound collage radio program
- Psy, South Korean rapper best known for "Gangnam Style" and "Gentleman"
- Public Image Ltd., English post-punk band
- Pussy Riot, Russian punk band
- Snog, Australian electronic-techno group
- The Tape-beatles, American multimedia group

== Political parties ==
- Anti-PowerPoint Party, Swiss political party
- The Beer Party, Austrian political party
- Best Party, Icelandic political party
- Bill and Ben Party, New Zealand joke political party
- German Apples Front, German satirical political party
- Hungarian Two-Tailed Dog Party, Hungarian satirical political party
- Official Monster Raving Loony Party, British satirical political party
- OLAF (Organization to solve the foreigner question), Swiss satirical political party by Andreas Heusser
- Party of Bread Eaters, Lithuanian frivolous political party
- Party of the Future, Dutch political party
- The Political Party, Norwegian satirical political party
- Sarmu probo nisi, Serbian satirical political organisation
- Shiji Seitō Nashi, Japanese political party
- Sou Tout Apwe Fete Fini, Saint Lucian political party
- Veterans of Future Wars, American satirical political organisation

== Publishers and publications ==
- 4chan, English-language imageboard
- Adbusters, Canadian anti-consumerist magazine
- Cult of the Dead Cow, American media organisation
- Encyclopedia Dramatica, parody wiki
- Indymedia, alternative, open publishing news site
- The Onion, American parody news site
- Processed World, American anti-capitalism magazine
- Reductress, American satire news site
- Stay Free!, American anti-consumerism magazine

== Religious ==
- Calvin Butts, American reverend who led his congregation members in painting over tobacco advertisements
- Church of Euthanasia, American religious and antinatalist activist group
- Church of the SubGenius, American parody religious organisation
- Discordianism, virtual religion
- Michael Pfleger, American reverend whose organisation Operation Clean targeted tobacco advertising
- The Satanic Temple, American non-theistic new religious movement

== Theatre and performance art ==
- Alan Abel, American hoaxer, writer, and filmmaker
- Ant Farm, performance art collective best known for their work Cadillac Ranch
- damali ayo, American artist known for her rent-a-negro.com website
- Billionaires for Bush, American street theater group
- Billionaires for Wealthcare, American guerrilla theatre group
- Biotic Baking Brigade, an organisation known for pieing public figures
- Emergency Broadcast Network, American multimedia performance group
- Guillermo Gómez-Peña, Mexican-American performance artist
- Guerrilla Girls On Tour, American theatre company split off from Guerrilla Girls
- Improv Everywhere, American improv group
- Improv Toronto, Canadian performance artist group
- James Luna, Puyukitchum-Ipai-Mexican-American performance artist
- Publixtheatre Caravan, English travelling activist/performance group
- Reverend Billy and the Church of Stop Shopping, American anti-consumerism guerrilla theatre group that mimics street preachers
- Joey Skaggs, American performance artist and media hoaxer
- Vermin Supreme, American performance artist
- The Yes Men, American duo of prankster/activists
- Yippies, American anti-war street theatre group known for stunts such as trying to levitate The Pentagon and campaigning a pig for president

== Unions ==
- Retail, Wholesale and Department Store Union Local 338, an American union that, in 2004, repurposed the Duane Reade logo to spread information about the chain's practices
- UNITE HERE, an American/Canadian trade union that led a campaign against American Apparel's practices in 2003

== Visual art ==
- 0100101110101101.ORG, American artist duo
- Ades, French artist
- Banksy, street artist based in London
- Beast, Italian artist
- Billboard Liberation Front, an American artist-activist organisation that that engages in billboard hacking
- Black Hand, Iranian graffiti artist
- Bleepsgr, Greek street artist
- BUGA UP, Australian subvertising group
- Cartrain, British artist
- David Černý, Czech artist
- Robbie Conal, American guerrilla poster artist
- Critical Art Ensemble, American tactical media group
- Sandra de la Loza, American artist
- The Decapitator, England-based street artist
- Joseph DeLappe, American artist and writer
- Brad Downey, American artist
- Marcel Duchamp, French-American artist
- Ron English, American street artist
- Escif, Spanish artist
- etoy, European digital art group
- Shepard Fairey, American graphic artist and creator of the Andre the Giant Has a Posse campaign and the Barack Obama "Hope" poster
- Tatyana Fazlalizadeh, American artist
- John Fekner, American street artist involved with Brandalism
- Scott Froschauer, American artist
- Graffiti Research Lab, American art project
- Andreas Heusser, Swiss artist
- infringement Festival, international critical arts festival
- Mark Jenkins, American sculptor
- Packard Jennings, American artist
- K Foundation, British art group known for their piece K Foundation Burn a Million Quid
- Imp Kerr, Swedish-French artist
- Chris Korda, American artist and activist, known as the founder of the Church of Euthanasia
- JR, French artist
- Steve Lambert, American conceptual artist
- John Law, American artist who is the founder of Cacophony Society, co-founder of The Burning Man, and former member of Suicide Club
- Don Leicht, American artist
- Lionel, Canadian artist
- Anthony Lister, Australian artist involved with Brandalism
- Meow Wolf, American artist known for Omega Mart
- Adrian Piper, American artist
- Poster Boy, American decentralised group of artists
- Sal Randolph, American artist and founder of Opsound
- Robert Rauschenberg, American painter and graphic artist
- Reza Rioter, Iranian graffiti artist
- Jorge Rodriguez-Gerada, Cuban-American artist and activist
- Schwa, conceptual artwork by American artist Bill Barker
- Jordan Seiler, American artist
- Will St Leger, Irish artist
- Jeff Wassmann, American artist
- Gillian Wearing, British artist
- Dan Witz, American artist
- Petro Wodkins, Russian artist
- Tavar Zawacki (formerly ABOVE), American artist based in Berlin

== Writers ==
- Hakim Bey, American anarchist writer of The Association for Ontological Anarchy
- Guy Debord, French writer, critic, and founder of the Situationist International
- Abbie Hoffman, American writer and activist
- Paul Krassner, American writer, satirist, and founder of The Realist
- Kalle Lasn, Estonian-Canadian writer, filmmaker, and co-founder of Adbusters
- Jerry Rubin, American social activist and writer
- John Safran, an Australian journalist and media prankster
- Nikolas Schiller, American blogger and activist
- Ivan Stang, American writer, filmmaker, and co-founder of the Church of the SubGenius

== Misc ==
- Luther Blissett, a global pseudonym originating in Italy that has been used by artists and activists since the 1990s
- Brujas, American skate collective
- Burning Man, an American anti-consumerism festival
- Stuart Ewen, American historian and academic
- Rémi Gaillard, French YouTuber and prankster
- Lumber Cartel, facetious conspiracy theory
- Molleindustria, Italian game designer
- The South Butt, American company parodying The North Face
- Sudo Room, American hackerspace
- Suicide Club, a secret society of urban adventurers
