= Rudyard Kipling's Jungle Book =

1942 film by Zoltan Korda

- Theatrical release poster
- Directed by: Zoltan Korda
- Screenplay by: Laurence Stallings (adapted by)
- Based on: The Jungle Book by Rudyard Kipling
- Produced by: Alexander Korda
- Starring: Sabu; Joseph Calleia; John Qualen; Frank Puglia; Rosemary De Camp; Patricia O'Rourke; Ralph Byrd
- Cinematography: Lee Garmes A.S.C. W. Howard Greene A.S.C.
- Edited by: William Hornbeck (supervising film editor)
- Music by: Miklos Rozsa
- Production company: Alexander Korda Films, Inc.
- Distributed by: United Artists
- Release date: April 3, 1942
- Running time: 108 minutes
- Countries: United Kingdom; United States
- Language: English
- Budget: £250,000 ($1 million)
- Box office: $11 million (est.)

The Jungle Book

Jungle Book or Rudyard Kipling's Jungle Book is a 1942 American action-adventure film in Technicolor independently produced by the Korda brothers and loosely adapted from Rudyard Kipling's 1894 story collection The Jungle Book. The story centers on Mowgli, a feral youth who is kidnapped by villagers who are cruel to the jungle animals as they attempt to steal a dead king's cursed treasure. The film was directed by Zoltan Korda and produced by his brother Alexander, with art direction by their younger brother Vincent. The screenplay was adapted by Laurence Stallings. The film stars Indian-born actor Sabu as Mowgli. Although the film is in public domain, the master 35mm elements are with ITV Studios Global Entertainment. An official video release is via The Criterion Collection.

The cinematography was by Lee Garmes and W. Howard Greene and the music was by Miklos Rozsa. Because of World War II, the Korda brothers moved their filmmaking to Hollywood in 1940, and Jungle Book is one of the films they produced during that Hollywood period. The film was a commercial success at the box office.

== Plot ==
In an Indian village, Buldeo, an elderly storyteller, is paid by a visiting British memsahib to tell a story of his youth.

As a younger man, he recalls his village being attacked by Shere Khan the rogue Bengal tiger. The attack leads to the death of a man and the loss of the man's child. The child is adopted by grey wolves in the jungle and grows to be the wild youth Mowgli. Twelve years after, Mowgli is captured by the villagers and taken in by his mother Messua, despite Buldeo's prejudice towards him for being from the jungle. He learns to speak and tries to imitate the ways of humans, and becomes friendly with Buldeo's daughter, Mahala.

When Mowgli and Mahala explore the jungle, they discover a hidden chamber in a ruined palace, containing fabulous wealth. Warned by an aged cobra that the wealth brings death, they leave, but Mahala takes one coin as a memento. When Buldeo sees the coin, he resolves to follow Mowgli to the site of the treasure.

Mowgli fights and uses a jambiya knife to kill Shere Khan, with some last minute help from Kaa, the Indian python. As he is skinning the body, Buldeo arrives. He threatens Mowgli with his hunting rifle to take him to the treasure, but is attacked by Mowgli's friend Bagheera, the black panther. Buldeo becomes convinced that Bagheera is Mowgli himself, shape-shifted into panther form. He tells the villagers that Mowgli is a witch, as is his mother. Mowgli is chained up and threatened with death, but escapes with his mother's help. However, she and another villager who tries to defend her are tied up and threatened to be burned for witchcraft.

Mowgli is followed by the greedy Buldeo and two friends, a pandit and a barber, to the lost city. They find the treasure and leave for the village with as much as they can carry. When they stop for the night, the priest tries to steal the treasure and murders the barber when the barber wakes up. The priest tells Buldeo that the barber had attacked him and that he had killed in self-defense, but Buldeo knows better. The next day, the priest attacks Buldeo while his back is turned, but Buldeo knocks him into the swamp where he is killed by a mugger crocodile. Mowgli tells Bagheera and Grey Brother to chase Buldeo from the jungle, and Buldeo flees for his life, jettisoning the treasure.

His pride wounded, a half-crazed Buldeo tries to murder Mowgli and destroy the jungle by starting a forest fire. The wind turns and the fire threatens the village. The villagers flee, but Mowgli's mother and her defender are trapped. Mowgli brings the local elephants including their leader Hathi who help free the captives and rescue the jungle animals from the fire. He is invited to follow them to a new life downriver, but chooses to stay and protect the jungle.

The scene returns to the present day, with the elderly Buldeo admitting that the jungle defeated his youthful dreams and destroyed his reputation. When asked how he escaped from the fire and what became of Mowgli and his daughter, Buldeo says that is another story.

== Cast ==
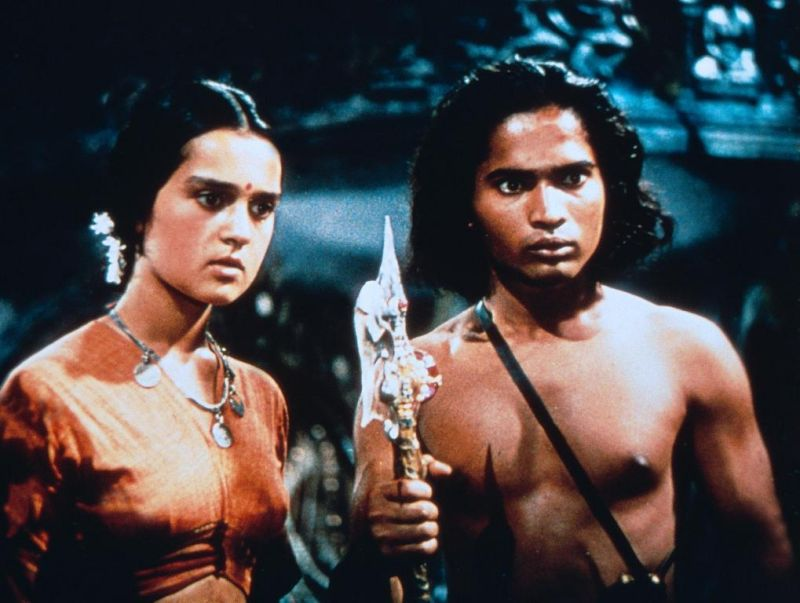
Patricia O'Rourke and Sabu

- Sabu as Mowgli
- Joseph Calleia as Buldeo
- John Qualen as The barber
- Frank Puglia as The pundit
- Rosemary De Camp as Messua
- Patricia O'Rourke as Mahala
- Ralph Byrd as Durga
- John Mather as Rao
- Faith Brook as Daughter of British magistrate
- Noble Johnson as Sikh

Uncredited

- Mel Blanc as voice of Kaa, Gray Brother
- Martha Wentworth as White Hood

== Production ==
In 1940, the three Korda brothers left London for Hollywood, where two of their films that had begun production in the UK were completed: The Thief of Bagdad and That Hamilton Woman.

United Artists lent Alexander Korda $300,000 to finance the production of Jungle Book, which was produced by the American company he set up for his Hollywood productions: Alexander Korda Films, Inc.

Laurence Stalling's adaptation was criticized for straying too far from the original, and the frequent disagreements between brothers Alexander and Zoltán did not help matters. Zoltán wanted an underplayed realistic story, while Alex favored an exuberant fantasist epic. Alex, as always, got his way in the end.

== Reception ==
=== Box office ===
The film was a notable success at the box office. In the United States and Canada, the film earned $1.3 million in box office rentals. In total, the film grossed $3.3 million from approximately 12.2 million ticket sales in the United States, equivalent to $115 million adjusted for inflation in 2021. In the United Kingdom, its 1948 re-release earned £86,089($346,940).

In France, it was one of the top ten highest-grossing films of 1946, drawing over 5 million admissions at the box office. At an average late-1940s admission price of 50 francs, this was equivalent to an estimated 254,248,100 francs ($727,088). The film also sold 18.9 million box office tickets in the Soviet Union when it released there in 1944. At an average 1950 admission price of 1.75 Rbls ($0.33), this was equivalent to an estimated 33 million Rbls ($6.2 million).

This adds up to an estimated $11 million grossed worldwide. In terms of box office admissions, it sold approximately 36,206,962 tickets in the United States, Soviet Union and France.

=== Critical response ===
Bosley Crowther of The New York Times noted the filmmakers have "used a whole menagerie to get some remarkable effects, and a finer lot of sleek and lithe wild creatures has never been shown on a screen. But he hasn't put together a solid picture. It is mainly a spectacle. Against the animal competition, the human actors show up quite badly." In summary, Crowther felt the "color is strikingly vivid and some of the individual scenes have natural charm. But the film, as a whole, is ostentatious." Variety similarly wrote: "Depending almost entirely on the pictorial grandeur and the production novelty, Korda has neglected any but a slight development of the human equation. Players therefore have unimportant assignments, with the exception of Sabu, who swims and swings his way through the jungle with ease and grace."

Harrison's Reports wrote: "This is a jungle fantasy, in which animals play an important part. It has been produced in gorgeous technicolor. The surroundings in which Sabu is cast are familiar ...But by being a fantasy, its appeal is not universal." A review in Time magazine felt the Korda brothers have produced "a laborious, sometimes silly tale, saved from disgrace only by some of the best Techni-colored animal photography extant." Edwin Schallert of the Los Angeles Times praised the visuals and the animals, but cautioned: "To say that Jungle Book is as good in its narrative as The Thief is not easy. Many will feel that it is, and certainly it rates right alongside its predecessor." On Rotten Tomatoes, 54% from 13 critics gave the film a positive review, with an average rating of 6.8/10.

== Awards ==
The film was nominated for four Academy Awards.

Nominated

- Best Art Direction-Interior Decoration, Color (Vincent Korda, Julia Heron)
- Best Visual Effects (Lawrence W. Butler, William H. Wilmarth)
- Best Original Score
- Best Cinematography

== Music ==
The extensive musical score by Miklos Rozsa caught the attention of RCA Victor, which proposed to make a recording of a suite with narration, comparable to Prokofiev's popular Peter and the Wolf. The 78-RPM album with narration by Sabu, became the first substantial recording of a Hollywood dramatic film score. Rozsa was especially pleased to record the music with members of Toscanini's NBC Symphony in New York. The album became very popular, and the suite has been recorded several times.

== See also ==
- List of films in the public domain in the United States

== Bibliography ==
- Kulik, Karol (1975). Alexander Korda: The Man Who Could Work Miracles. Arlington House. ISBN 978-0-870-00335-6.
