= Vincent Korda =

Hungarian art director (1897–1979)

- Born: Kellner Vince; 22 June 1897; Pusztatúrpásztó, Austria-Hungary (today part of Túrkeve, Hungary)
- Died: 4 January 1979 (aged 81); Chelsea, London, England
- Occupations: Artist, Art director
- Years active: 1918–1964
- Spouse(s): Leila Rubin, née Hyde (m. 1947; d. 1972); Gertrude Musgrove (m. 1933; dv 1942)
- Children: 4, including Michael Korda
- Family: Alexander Korda (brother); Zoltan Korda (brother); Chris Korda (granddaughter)

Vincent Korda (22 June 1897 – 4 January 1979) was a Hungarian-born artist and art director, born in Túrkeve in what was then the Austro-Hungarian Empire. From 1918 to 1921 he lived and worked in the Nagybánya artists' colony, which was then a town in eastern Hungary. He continued to work as an artist in Paris and Cagnes-sur-Mer from 1923 to 1933. He became an art director in 1931, settling in Britain in 1933. He was the younger brother of Alexander and Zoltan Korda. He was nominated for four Academy Awards, winning once. He died in London, England. He is the father of four children, including writer and editor Michael Korda, and the grandfather of Chris Korda.

== Academy Awards ==
Korda won an Academy Award for Best Art Direction and was nominated for three more:

Won

- The Thief of Bagdad (1940)

Nominated

- That Hamilton Woman (1941)
- Jungle Book (1942)
- The Longest Day (1962)

== Filmography ==
- Marius (1931)
- Longing for the Sea (1931)
- Men of Tomorrow (1932)
- Wedding Rehearsal (1932)
- The Girl from Maxim's (1933)
- The Private Life of Henry VIII (1933)
- The Rise of Catherine the Great (1934)
- The Private Life of Don Juan (1934)
- The Scarlet Pimpernel (1934)
- The Ghost Goes West (1935)
- Moscow Nights (1935)
- Things to Come (1936)
- The Man Who Could Work Miracles (1936)
- Rembrandt (1936)
- Men Are Not Gods (1936)
- Paradise for Two (1937)
- Action for Slander (1937)
- The Squeaker (1937)
- The Drum (1938)
- Prison Without Bars (1938)
- The Challenge (1938)
- Over the Moon (1939)
- The Spy in Black (1939)
- The Four Feathers (1939)
- The Lion Has Wings (1939)
- Q Planes (1939)
- The Thief of Bagdad (1940)
- 21 Days (1940)
- Major Barbara (1941)
- Old Bill and Son (1941)
- That Hamilton Woman (1941)
- Lydia (1941)
- To Be or Not to Be (1942)
- The Jungle Book (1942)
- Perfect Strangers (1945)
- An Ideal Husband (1947)
- The Fallen Idol (1948)
- Bonnie Prince Charlie (1948)
- The Third Man (1949)
- Outcast of the Islands (1951)
- Home at Seven (1952)
- The Sound Barrier (1952)
- The Holly and the Ivy (1952)
- Malaga (1954)
- Summertime (1955)
- Storm Over the Nile (1955)
- The Deep Blue Sea (1955)
- Holiday in Spain (1960)
- The Longest Day (1962)
- The Yellow Rolls-Royce (1964)
