= Improv Toronto =

Improv in Toronto (IT) is an urban pranking group that resides in Toronto. Formed in 2008, Improv Toronto is a group inspired by New York City's Improv Everywhere, and is a member of the Urban Prankster Network.

Based entirely volunteer group headed by Cole Banning, the community has thrived over the past years, holding both large-scale events that are open to public such as No Pants Subway Ride! 2K9 and ones that are executed by Improv in Toronto Agents like Finish Line Marathon.

The group is based on the belief that they're "making people's days", the style is less "flashy" of flash mobs, as their events often last hours on end. They believe that since the city always seems to be on such a routine, they exist to "shake it up".

Improv in Toronto has been covered by various media including the Toronto Star, the Toronto Sun, the CBC news network, as well as various blogs such as BlogTO. In 2008, they were listed as one of Torontoist's "Heroes", in their annual "Heroes and Villains" poll. As well, Improv in Toronto posts videos of all their mission to their YouTube channel.

== Notable missions ==
- Subway Dance Party - Hundreds of people gather on the Toronto Transit Commission subway to have a silent dance party to the music on their own MP3s.
- Clue - A real life version of the board game of Clue. Held in the Eaton Centre in downtown Toronto, the characters of the game (Col. Mustard, Ms. Scarlett, Prof. Plum, Ms. Peacock, Mr. Green, and Ms. White) were hidden throughout the mall. Participants had to perform tasks for each character to collect their clues and give their accusations to the 'detective' to determine who killed Mr. Body.
- Free Hugs - An annual Improv in Toronto event that is hosted on the first weekend of July. Hundreds of people walk the streets of downtown Toronto carrying signs advertising "Free Hugs" on them, and providing free hugs to strangers who want one.
- No Pants 2K8, 2K9, and 2K10 - An annual event that has now happens around the world, originally started by Improv Everywhere, No Pants Ride is an event where the participants ride the subway while not wearing pants (trousers).
- Scavenger Hunt - Teams met at Nathan Phillips Square awaiting orders, and their list of items that were required to win in this Toronto-based event. Items ranged from napkins, to information from statues, to pictures of various objects. Teams would report back to Nathan Phillips Square to get their points added up and to determine a winner.
- MP3 Experiment - Participants are required to download a MP3 track without listening to it until the day of the event. They are invited to meet at a specific location in the city, and at a certain time, they are asked to press play at the same time. The participants then follow instructions that the MP3 carries, outlining activities for the participants to do.
- Where's Waldo - Held within the Eaton Centre, thirteen "Waldos" were hidden throughout the mall, with only one real Waldo. Each fake Waldo held a clue about the real Waldo’s whereabouts, but they would only give it out if the participants completed a random task.
- Eaton Centre Freeze - A recreation of the "Grand Central Station Freeze" in the Eaton Centre.

== See also ==
- Newmindspace
- Improv Everywhere
