= The Decapitator =

Anonymous street artist in England

The Decapitator, or The East London Decapitator. is an anonymous England-based culture-jamming street artist, known for his gruesome and grisly beheadings of models in advertisements around London. The work consists of printouts that are wheatpasted on top of street adverts, such as posters and billboards, giving the impression that the character has been decapitated, leaving blood splattered around the severed area and a nonanatomic bone sticking out of the neck.

The first interventions started to appear in late 2007, in London's East End, not far away from where the notorious serial killer Jack The Ripper used to roam. The defaced ads were photographed and published on the artist's Flickr page Amongst the subjects that were featured on the Decapitator's work are: Kermit the frog, Daft Punk, Colonel Sanders, models for advertising campaigns, politicians, musicians such as Pitbull and Shakira, David Beckham, and Sarah Jessica Parker (in a campaign for her "Sex and the City" movie).

Works of the Decapitator appeared in different cities around the world, such as Paris, Buenos Aires, São Paulo, Rio de Janeiro and New York, where, in 2009, the artist made a collaboration with American street artist, Poster Boy, creating a hybrid of the artist's two styles: "The Decrapitator", spotted in the streets of Bushwick

The Decapitator's work was featured in the Taschen book "TRESPASS: A history of uncommissioned urban art" alongside pieces by Banksy, Keith Haring and Shepard Fairey.

== See Also ==
- List of culture jamming organizations and people
