= Unabomber for President =

Political campaign

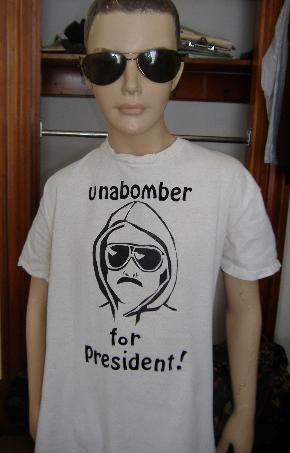
A "Unabomber for President" T-shirt, based on the sketch of the Unabomber by Jeanne Boylan

Unabomber for President was a political campaign with the aim of electing mathematician and domestic terrorist Ted Kaczynski (known as the "Unabomber") as a write-in candidate in the 1996 presidential election. The campaign's slogan was the Shermanesque statement "if elected, he will not serve."

The campaign was launched in Boston in September 1995 by Lydia Eccles – a Boston artist who had long harbored concerns about "totalitarian tendencies in technology" – and antinatalist Chris Korda. It took the overt form of a political action committee, Unabomber Political Action Committee (UNAPACK). Influenced initially by ideas of the Situationist International, the group included anarchists, hardcore punks, 1960s counter-culturalists, eco-socialists, pacifists, militants and primitivists. Its supporters included decentralized anarchist collective CrimethInc. and the Church of Euthanasia.

The campaign received national publicity, and attempts by news organizations to portray it as frivolous were resisted by UNAPACK, who insisted that the issues raised by Kaczynski were portentous, concerning "the fate of mankind". In the words of the Phoenix New Times, the campaign was "an effort designed to cast votes in protest of the existing hierarchy and its potential replacement." The Maoist Internationalist Movement criticized the campaign as typifying "life-style politics anarchism" and as encouraging protest votes instead of seizing political power from the upper class.

As Bill Brown, director of the campaign's New York City office, said at the time: "Most of the media are unable to deal with the campaign...[t]here is no way for people to understand why you would say 'Unabomber for President' and that gives us a tactical opportunity to explain ourselves." The intended symbolism of the campaign was not that it was a joke, but that the political system was a joke.
