= William H. Wilmarth =

American sound engineer

- Born: August 3, 1904; Milan, Italy
- Died: January 25, 1999 (aged 94); Ojai, California, United States
- Occupation: Sound engineer
- Years active: 1933-1961

William Henry Wilmarth (August 3, 1904 – January 25, 1999) was an American sound engineer. He was nominated for two Academy Awards for Best Special Effects.

== Selected filmography ==
Wilmarth was nominated for two Academy Awards for Best Special Effects:

Nominated

- That Hamilton Woman (1941)
- Jungle Book (1942)
