= The Thief of Bagdad (1940 film) =

- Theatrical release poster
- Directed by: Ludwig Berger; Michael Powell; Tim Whelan
- Written by: Miles Malleson (screenplay and dialogue); Lajos Biro (scenario)
- Produced by: Alexander Korda
- Starring: Conrad Veidt; Sabu; June Duprez; John Justin; Rex Ingram; Mary Morris
- Cinematography: George Perinal
- Edited by: Charles Crichton
- Music by: Miklos Rozsa
- Color process: Technicolor
- Production company: London Films
- Distributed by: United Artists
- Release dates: 5 December 1940 (US); 25 December 1940 (UK)
- Running time: 106 minutes
- Country: United Kingdom
- Language: English
- Budget: $1.75 million
- Box office: $13 million (est.)

The Thief of Bagdad is a 1940 British Technicolor historical fantasy film, produced by Alexander Korda and directed by Michael Powell, Ludwig Berger and Tim Whelan, with additional contributions by William Cameron Menzies (who had designed sets for the original 1924 version vehicle for Douglas Fairbanks) and Korda brothers Vincent and Zoltán. The film stars Conrad Veidt, Indian-born teen actor Sabu, June Duprez, John Justin, and Rex Ingram. It was released in the US and the UK by United Artists.

Georges Périnal, credited as George Perinal, won the Academy Award for Best Cinematography, Vincent Korda for Art Direction, and Lawrence W. Butler and Jack Whitney for Special Effects (marking the first use of the "manual bluescreen technique"). Miklós Rózsa was also nominated for Best Original Music Score, a first for a British film at the Academy Awards.

Although this production is a remake of the 1924 version, the two films have differences, the most significant being that the thief and the prince are separate characters in this version. The screenplay is by Lajos Biro and Miles Malleson, who also appears in the film as the Princess's father, the Sultan of Basra.

== Plot ==
In ancient Basra, a blind beggar begins telling the film's story in flashback (mimicking the style of the Arabian Nights), revealing that he is really Ahmad, the young, naive king of Baghdad. Wanting to know more about his people, Ahmad is tricked by Jaffar, his Grand Vizier, into going in disguise into the city. Jaffar then has him arrested and usurps the throne. In prison, Ahmad meets the young thief Abu, who arranges their escape. They flee to Basra, where Ahmad meets and falls in love with the Princess. Jaffar, however, also journeys to Basra, intent on having the Princess for himself.

Jaffar, a powerful sorcerer, provides the toy-obsessed Sultan of Basra with a mechanical flying horse in exchange for his daughter's hand in marriage. The Princess, now in love with Ahmad, runs away, but Jaffar uses magic to blind Ahmad and turn Abu into a dog. She is captured and taken to the slave market, where she is bought by Jaffar's agent. At the palace, though, she falls into a deep sleep and cannot be awakened. Halima, Jaffar's minion, tricks Ahmad into awakening the Princess. He is then dismissed with the dog to the city's docks, where he concludes his story.

The Princess is tricked into boarding Jaffar's ship. Jaffar tells her that she can cure Ahmad's blindness only by allowing the sorcerer to embrace her. She submits and the spells are lifted from both Ahmad and Abu. When the pair sail in pursuit, Jaffar raises a storm that shipwrecks them. Returning to Basra, Jaffar intrigues the Sultan with a life-sized automaton, 'The Silver Maiden', whom the Sultan embraces until she stabs him in the back. Jaffar then returns to Baghdad with the Princess.

Abu awakes alone on a deserted beach. He finds a bottle and opens it, releasing an enormous genie so embittered by his long imprisonment he announces he will kill the boy. Abu tricks the genie into submitting to him and granting him three wishes. The first wish is wasted, but the genie helps Abu steal a magical jewel, the "All-Seeing Eye", that enables him to find and reunite with Ahmad. With the jewel, Ahmad sees Jaffar using his magic to make the Princess forget her true love. Despondent, Ahmad quarrels with Abu, who inadvertently uses his third wish to send Ahmad back to Baghdad.

In Baghdad, Ahmad is reunited with the Princess, who remembers him. They are imprisoned by Jaffar and condemned to death. Abu helplessly witnesses all this with the jewel's aid. In anger, he destroys the jewel, which frees the "Old King" of the "Land of Legend". Abu is given a magic crossbow as a reward. He steals the king's magic carpet and flies on it to Baghdad. Abu's appearance fulfils an ancient prophecy and sparks a revolt against Jaffar by the city's inhabitants. Abu kills the fleeing Jaffar with the crossbow, and Ahmad is restored to power. Abu, alarmed by Ahmad's plans to educate him to become the vizier, flies off on the carpet in search of fun and adventure.

== Cast ==
- Conrad Veidt as Jaffar
- Sabu as Abu
- June Duprez as the Princess
- John Justin as Ahmad
- Rex Ingram as the Djinn
- Miles Malleson as the Sultan of Basra
- Morton Selten as the Old King
- Mary Morris as Halima, Jaffar's agent, and the "Silver Maid"
- Bruce Winston as the Merchant
- Hay Petrie as the Astrologer
- Adelaide Hall as the Singer
- Roy Emerton as the Jailor
- Allan Jeayes as the Story Teller
- Robert Greig as a man of Basra (uncredited)
- Glynis Johns as a maid of the princess (uncredited)
- Tao Porchon-Lynch as the golden idol (uncredited)
- Leslie Phillips as a street urchin (uncredited)
- Cleo Laine as a street urchin (uncredited)

Korda had intended to cast Vivien Leigh as the Princess.

== Production ==
Producer Alexander Korda, after a search for a director, chose German filmmaker Ludwig Berger in early 1939, but by the early summer became dissatisfied with Berger's overall conception of the movie—feeling it was too small-scale and intimate—and, specifically, the score that Berger proposed to use. Essentially behind Berger's back, British director Michael Powell was brought in to shoot various scenes—and Powell's scheduled work grew in amount and importance while, in the meantime, Korda himself did his best to undercut Berger on his own set; and while publicly siding with Berger on the issue of the music, he also undercut Berger's chosen composer (Oscar Straus) by bringing in Miklos Rozsa and putting him into an office directly adjacent to Berger's with a piano, to work on a score. Eventually, Berger was persuaded to walk away from the project, and American filmmaker Tim Whelan, who had just finished work on another Korda-produced movie (Q Planes), was brought in to help augment Powell's work. However, work was suspended with the outbreak of the Second World War in September 1939, for Powell was taken off the picture and put to work on the morale-boosting documentary The Lion Has Wings.

By the end of the year, Korda found himself running out of money and credit, and in the spring of 1940 he arranged to move the entire production to Hollywood (where some shots of the movie's young star Sabu had to be redone, for he had grown more than 3 inches (76 mm) in the year since shooting had commenced). Powell remained in England, so direction was taken up in Hollywood by Menzies and Zoltan Korda during the summer of 1940—including shots of the heroes in the Grand Canyon, Monument Valley, Bryce Canyon and the Painted Desert; the scenes in the Temple of the Goddess of Light, among the last to be written, were done late in the summer, and the film was edited and re-structured into the autumn of 1940.

At some point during production, the film was being written as a musical. The finished film has three songs, but others were written, with recordings of some surviving, including one verse of Rex Ingram singing a song written for the genie.

The film is notable for being the first film Peter R. Hunt worked on, serving as an associate editor at the age of 15. Hunt later worked on six James Bond films, including directing 1969's On Her Majesty's Secret Service.

== Box office ==
The film was Korda's most successful in the US. In the US and Canada, it earned over $1 million in rentals and grossed $2.9 million in revenue, equivalent to an estimated 12 million ticket sales.

The film was also a success in other markets. In the Soviet Union, where it released in 1944, the film sold 26 million tickets, equivalent to an estimated $8.6 million gross revenue. (Note: See Film industry § Average ticket price.) In France, where it released in 1946, it became the seventh most-attended film of the year with 5,135,145 ticket sales, equivalent to an estimated $1.8 million gross revenue.

Worldwide, the film grossed an estimated $13 million revenue and sold an estimated 43 million tickets.

== Reception ==
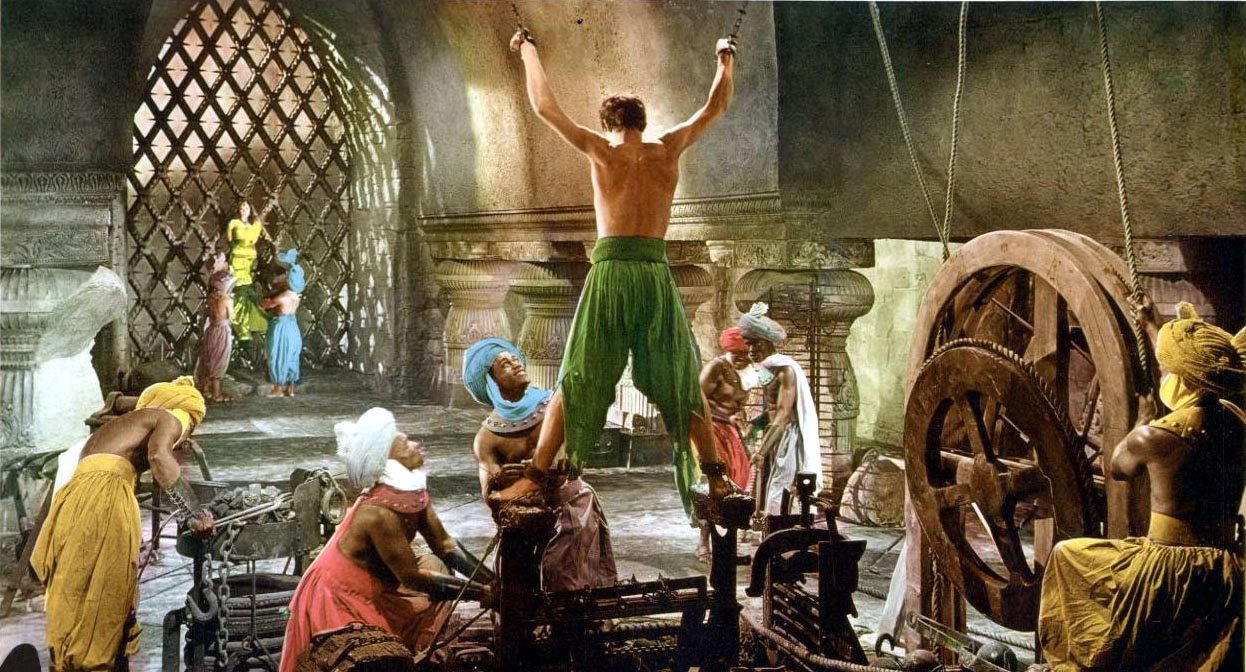
Lobby card showing the Princess and Ahmad imprisoned and awaiting their execution

The film premiered at Radio City Music Hall. The New York Times reviewer Bosley Crowther enthused that the film "ranks next to Fantasia as the most beguiling and wondrous film of this troubled season". Crowther praised "its truly magnificent color" and the performances of all five main actors.

Roger Ebert of the Chicago Sun-Times added The Thief of Bagdad to his "Great Movies" list, calling it "on a level with The Wizard of Oz". According to Ebert, "It maintains a consistent spirit, and that spirit is one of headlong joy in storytelling." He praised the performances of Sabu and Veidt ("perfectly pitched to the needs of the screenplay"), but he was less impressed with the chemistry between Duprez and Justin ("rather bloodless").

The film holds a 100% rating on Rotten Tomatoes based on 28 reviews, with an average score of 8.7/10. Its consensus states: "Dashing, dazzling, and altogether magical, The Thief of Bagdad is an enchanting fantasy for children of all ages."

== Influence ==
The film has been highly influential on later movies based on The Book of One Thousand and One Nights setting. For example, the Disney film Aladdin borrows freely from it, particularly the characters of the evil vizier and the sultan, both drawn with a marked similarity to the characters in The Thief of Bagdad. The villain Jafar is named after the character played by Conrad Veidt, himself named after the historical vizier Ja'far ibn Yahya, who served Harun ar-Rashid. Like the sultan of the earlier film, Disney's Sultan is obsessed with toys. The thieving monkey Abu in the Disney cartoon is based on the character of the same name played by Sabu. Richard Williams, speaking about his film The Thief and the Cobbler, said that one of his interests was in creating a fantasy film that did not copy from it. The Prince of Persia video game franchise also shares similar characteristics with the film.

Larry Butler invented the first proper chroma key process for the special effects scenes in this film, a variation on the existing "traveling matte" process. This technique has since become the standard process for separating screen elements and/or actors from their backgrounds and placing them on new backgrounds for special effects purposes and has since been used in thousands of films.

This film later influenced the creation of the Malay film Abu Hassan Penchuri ("Abu Hassan the Thief", 1955), which was set in Baghdad.

== Home media ==
The film was released on VHS by The Samuel Goldwyn Company. The film was released on DVD by MGM in 2002. The Criterion Collection released a two-disc DVD release in 2008 that includes a commentary track by filmmakers Martin Scorsese and Francis Ford Coppola, who are both longtime fans of the film (their comments were recorded separately and then edited together).

It has been released on Region B–locked Blu-rays in Germany (Anolis Entertainment, 2012) and the UK (Network Distributing, 2015). The UK disc also includes image galleries and the original theatrical trailer. The German disc features the same extras, plus additional trailers, an audio commentary and a 53-minute documentary on the film's star, Sabu. The Thief of Baghdad is also set to be released on region-free blu-ray on September 25, 2025 by Imprint Films.

== See also ==
- List of films with a 100% rating on Rotten Tomatoes, a film review aggregator website
