= Reza Rioter =

Iranian Graffiti Artist

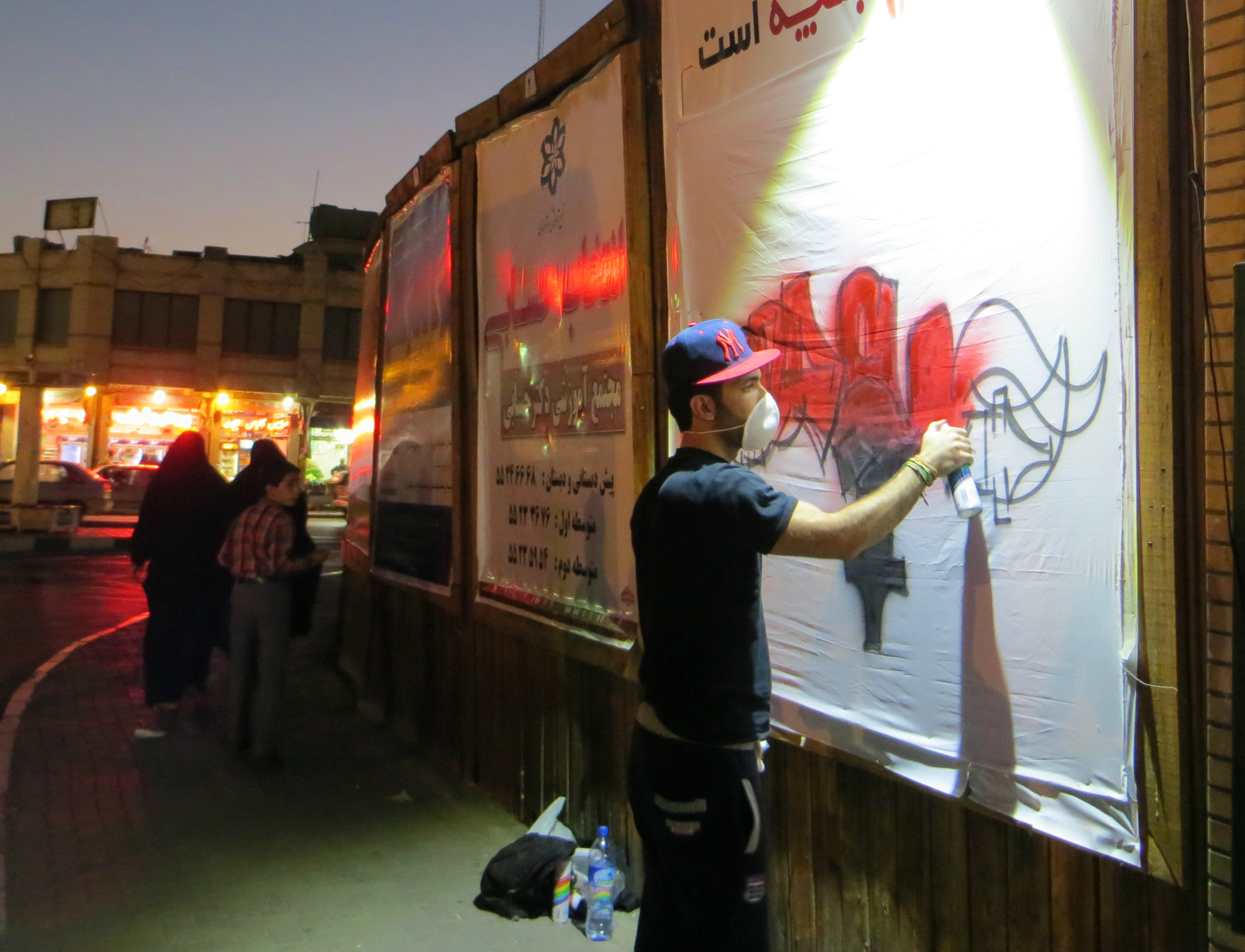
Rioter in Kashan, Iran (2015).

Reza Rioter (Majnoun) (Persian: رضا ریوتر) is an Iranian graffiti artist. He first began creating graffiti in 2006 in Kashan, Iran. Because of his art and influence, featured in Graffiti Iran Magazine, among others, people know Kashan as one of the first Iranian cities to feature graffiti and street art.

In an essay on graffiti artists in Iran, Art Radar wrote: "Although Iran has in recent years initiated a variety of urban beautification projects featuring monumental murals in the urban landscape, most street artists still have to work underground due to state censorship and the illegal status of graffiti."

In 2016, Culture Trip, an online magazine, wrote about Iran's graffiti artists: "They spray Tehran’s city walls with vibrant colors, oppose social injustice with visual provocation and defy the law with their artistic statements."

== Career ==
As an amateur rapper, Rioter started his career in Kashan. Upon taking up graffiti in 2006, he decided to change focus from music to art. From 2006 through 2011, he created most of his graffiti in the city of Aran va Bidgol.

During that time, in 2010 Rioter used the web as a promotional platform to promote his art of graffiti with a change in style and presentation, using Persian letters so more viewers could read his art. He is one of the first artists to gain recognition for graffiti in Persian.

Afterwards, for almost two years until 2013, he stayed active in the city of Ghotb Ravandi Bolvar.

Since 2013, he has created graffiti on the main streets of Kashan, including 15 Khordad Square and various other places.

== Internet marketing ==
Understanding that social media and the internet are a path for wider recognition, many Iranian graffiti artists have shared their work online and gained popularity. Reza Rioter occasionally publishes his talents online. His Facebook page is @RezaRioterGraffiti, which he established in 2012. He established his Twitter handle, @RezaRioter, in 2016. His Instagram account is @Reza_Rioter.

He has attempted to establish himself in the genre of modern art, but said it was extraordinarily difficult to do so in a traditional city, such as Kashan, which has a conservative culture. In late 2015, the Huffington Post published an article profiling 'Iranian street artists' and exploring how the artists are "spreading freedom, expression and love through visually striking and politically charged graphic imagery."

== Recent activities and controversies ==
Rioter has published online essays about graffiti. In 2014 he published his first "videograf," a video of graffiti art, on various websites, including Facebook, where his post garnered over 17,000 views. In recent years, Reza Rioter has appeared in numerous videografs.

In 2015 he released his second videograf, honoring Sohrab Sepehri, a poet from Kashan. In the video, Reza Rioter asked why there is graffiti on Sohrab Sepehri Street in Kashan.

Reza Rioter also took part in a radio program about graffiti. The program represented the first documentary by the government media of Iran, exploring graffiti art. After its airing, Reza Rioter said his comments had been significantly censored.

Recently, Rioter graffitied a wall on the main street of Kashan. It was later draped in a cloth. The municipality had issued him a license to create the art, but then covered it up. After a few days, it allowed him to finish his graffiti before expunging it again, allegedly under pressure from higher authorities.

== Arrests ==
In 2015, Rioter was arrested by the morality police in Kashan and charged with creating graffiti. He was held in Kashan Prison for four days in Ward 4.
