= Chris Korda =

American artist, musician, software developer, and activist (born 1962)

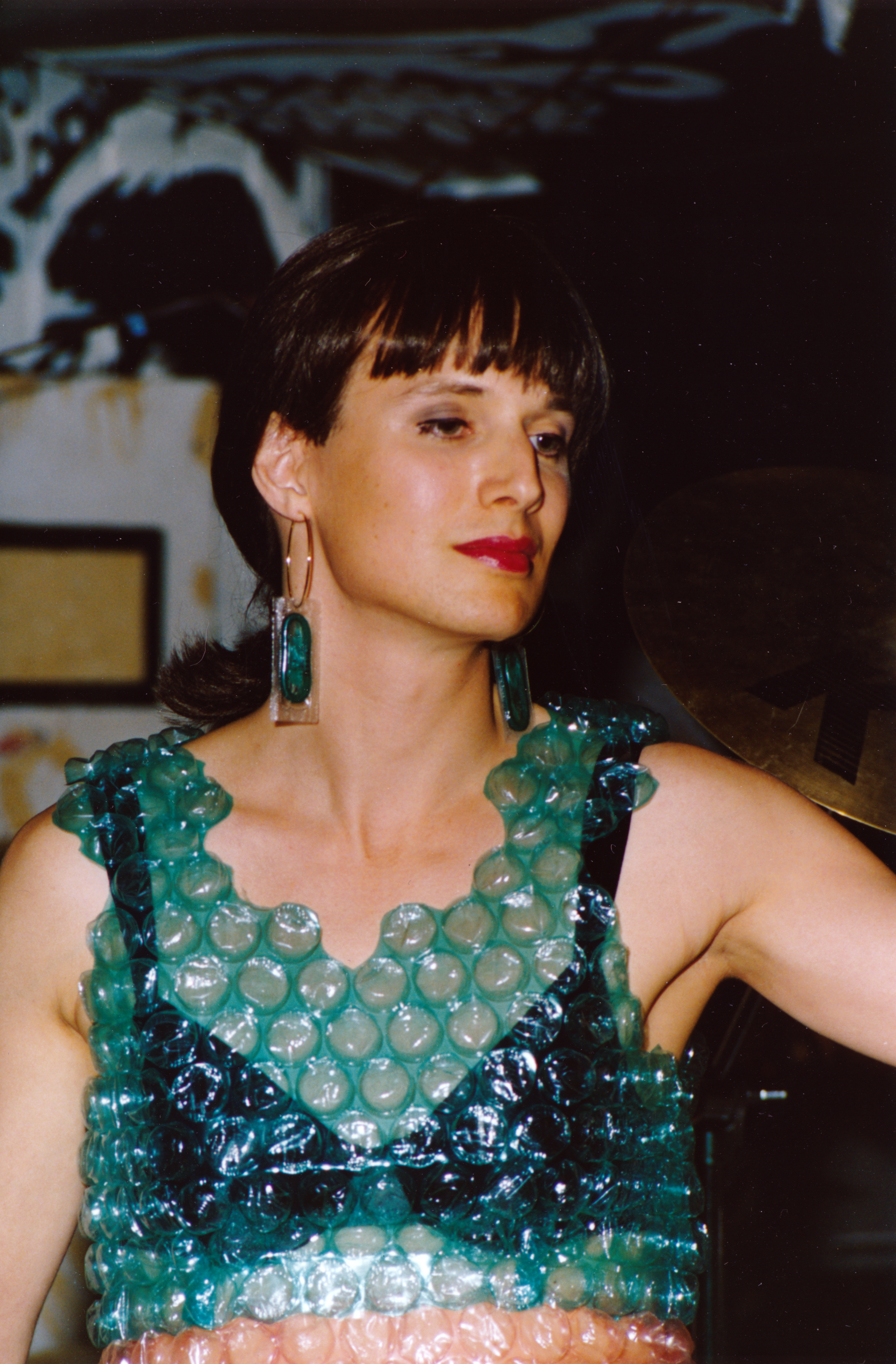
- Born: 1962 (age 63–64); New York City, U.S.
- Occupations: Artist, Musician, Software Developer, Activist
- Known for: Founder of the Church of Euthanasia
- Father: Michael Korda
- Relatives: Vincent Korda (grandfather); Alexander Korda (great-uncle); Zoltan Korda (great-uncle)
- Website: Official website of Chris Korda

Chris Korda (born 1962) is an American artist, electronic musician, software developer, and environmental activist, best known as the leader of the Church of Euthanasia.

== Early life and education ==
Chris Korda was born in 1962 in New York City into a Jewish family. Korda is the daughter of Michael Korda and his first wife, Carolyn Keese. She is the granddaughter of art director Vincent Korda, and the great-niece of film directors Alexander Korda and Zoltan Korda. She is a graduate of the Hammonasset School.

== Career ==
=== Artistic work ===
In 1992, Korda founded the Church of Euthanasia, a satirical religious organization advocating for population reduction through non-traditional methods, including abortion, cannibalism, and sodomy. Korda used this platform to raise awareness about overpopulation and environmental degradation.

In 1995, Korda, together with Lydia Eccles, launched the campaign Unabomber for President. This campaign took the form of a political action committee, Unabomber Political Action Committee (UNAPACK). The group supported the arguments set forth in the Unabomber Manifesto, but not Ted Kaczynski himself.

The Church of Euthanasia's activities often involved performance art, including provocative demonstrations and multimedia presentations.

The music video "I Like to Watch", which was published on the website of the Church of Euthanasia after the terrorist attacks on September 11, 2001, provoked criticism. It combined footage from the coverage of the attacks with excerpts from pornographic films and sporting events.

In 2022, the "Le Confort Moderne" main gallery showed a retrospective of Korda's work. Artforum magazine wrote about the exhibition: "The cumulative effect of these pieces, ... is to sow doubt. Korda, ... excels at appropriating the very language and tools of political populism and evangelism that are prevalent across mass media and culture." Frieze Magazine reviewed the exhibition and wrote: "Korda's primary aim is to raise awareness about the environmental crisis and the need for radical solutions. Her secondary aim, ..., is to revitalize human creativity through collaboration with machines. She explores this project as a software developer, creating programs designed to generate forms and music exceeding human capacities."

In 2024, Korda's work was featured in an exhibition titled "Artist's Con(tra)ception" at the Kölnischer Kunstverein in Germany. This exhibition showcased the depth of Korda's artistic contributions, presenting her blend of art, activism, and performance.

=== Musical work ===
Korda began experimenting with electronic music in the late 1980s, using synthesizers and computer software. Her albums include Six Billion Humans Can't Be Wrong (1999), The Man of the Future (2003), and Akoko Ajeji (2019).

Korda toured Europe with the album The Man of the Future, released in 2003 by the German electronic music record label International Deejay Gigolo Records. Korda has performed at numerous electronic music festivals and events worldwide, including the Sonar Music Festival in Barcelona in 2001. Korda's live performances often feature the use of her own software.

=== Software development ===
In 2008, Korda designed Fractice, a fractal renderer. She is also the inventor of music software such as Waveshop (2013), a bit-perfect lossless free audio editor, and ChordEase (2014), a free software tool that simplifies playing notes on any MIDI instrument. ChordEase was presented at the 2015 International Conference on New Interfaces for Musical Expression.

== Personal life ==
Korda is transgender and has been open about her gender identity.

== Reception and legacy ==
Korda's work has been both celebrated and criticized for its unorthodox approach and provocative messaging.

== Selected discography ==
=== Albums ===
- Six Billion Humans Can't Be Wrong (1999) – DJ Mix; as Chris Korda & The Church Of Euthanasia; International Deejay Gigolos
- The Man Of The Future (2003) – International Deejay Gigolo Records
- Victim Of Leisure – Live @ BURN.FM (2004) – Platoniq
- Akoko Ajeji (2019) – Perlon
- Polymeter (2020) – Mental Groove Records
- Apologize To The Future (2020) – Perlon
- More Than Four (2022) – Chapelle XIV, CHXIV05, 12" x 2 + Digital
- Indirect Methods (2022) – Kevorkian Records, Kevorkian 6, Digital
- Passion For Numbers (2022) – Mental Groove, MG135, 12" + Digital
- All My Problems Are Soluble (2025) – Bandcamp

=== Singles and EPs ===
- Save The Planet, Kill Yourself (1993) – Kevorkian Records
- Save The Planet, Kill Yourself (Re-Release; 1997) – International Deejay Gigolos
- Sex Is Good (1998) – International Deejay Gigolos
- I Like To Watch (2002) – Null Records
- When It Rains EP (2002) – International Deejay Gigolos
- The Man Of The Future (2003) – International Deejay Gigolos
- Magic Cookie EP (2020) – Partout
- Primitive Man (2023) – Yoyaku / YYK No Label, YYKordaPM, 12" + Digital
- Not My Problem, I'll Be Dead (2023) – Yoyaku / YYK No Label, BBB, 12" + Digital
- Avenging Angels of Software (2024) – Slacker 85, HRL010, 12" + Digital

== Publications ==
- Overshoot (2025), Chris Korda. Road House, Paris. Hardcover, 30.5 × 30.5 cm, 90 pages. ISBN 978-2-488450-01-0.
- Adagio For Color Fields (2023), Chris Korda & Ruiz Stephinson (eds.). Goswell Road, Paris. Hardcover, 21.6 × 30.5 cm, 54 pages.
- Snuff It, The Quarterly Journal of The Church of Euthanasia / Issue #1–#5 (2019), Chris Korda & Various (comp.). Goswell Road, Paris. Softcover, 21 × 29.7 cm, 148 pages. ISBN 979-10-97061-20-3.
- Chris Korda & The Church of Euthanasia / Archives 1992–2019 (2019), Ruiz Stephinson (ed.). Goswell Road, Paris. Softcover, 21 × 29.7 cm, 80 pages. ISBN 979-10-97061-18-0.
