= That Hamilton Woman =

1941 film by Alexander Korda

That Hamilton Woman (Lady Hamilton)
- theatrical release poster
- Directed by: Alexander Korda
- Written by: Walter Reisch; R. C. Sherriff
- Produced by: Alexander Korda
- Starring: Vivien Leigh; Laurence Olivier; Alan Mowbray
- Cinematography: Rudolph Maté
- Edited by: William W. Hornbeck
- Music by: Miklós Rózsa
- Production company: London Films
- Distributed by: United Artists
- Release date: 30 April 1941
- Running time: 128 minutes
- Countries: United States; United Kingdom
- Language: English
- Budget: $1,250,000
- Box office: over $1 million (US/Canada, 1941 release) £119,305 (UK, 1948 re-release); 2,360,970 admissions (France, 1945)

That Hamilton Woman, also known as Lady Hamilton, is a 1941 black-and-white historical film drama produced and directed by Alexander Korda for his British company during his exile in the United States. Set during the Napoleonic Wars, the film tells the story of the rise and fall of Emma Hamilton, dance-hall girl and courtesan, who married Sir William Hamilton, British ambassador to the Kingdom of Naples, and later became Admiral Horatio Nelson's mistress.

The film was a critical and financial success, and while on the surface the plot is both a war story and a romance set in Napoleonic times, it was also intended to function as a film that would portray Britain positively within the context of World War II, which was being fought at that time. At the time it was released, France, Belgium, the Netherlands, Norway, Poland and Denmark were all occupied by Germany and the Soviet Union was still officially allied with the Third Reich, so the British were fighting against the Nazis alone and felt the need to produce films that would both boost their morale and also portray them sympathetically to the foreign world, especially the United States. On Rotten Tomatoes, That Hamilton Woman has a 100% rating based on 11 reviews.

== Plot ==
The aging, alcoholic Lady Emma Hamilton is clapped into debtor's prison in the slums of Calais. In a husky, despairing, whiskey-soaked voice, she narrates her life story to her skeptical fellow prisoners. In one of the early scenes that launches the flashback, Emma looks into a mirror and remembers "the face I knew before", the face of the young, lovely girl who captured the imagination of artists—most notably George Romney and Joshua Reynolds.

Emma Hart's early life as the mistress of the charming but unreliable Charles Francis Greville leads to her meeting with his wealthy uncle Sir William Hamilton, the British ambassador to Naples.

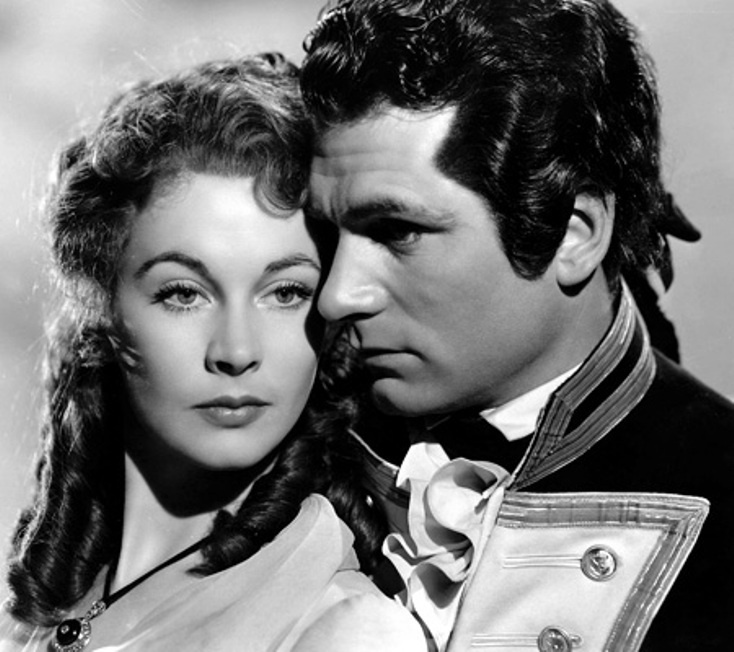
Vivien Leigh and Laurence Olivier

Greville gives Emma to Sir William in exchange for relief on his debts. At first, Emma is crushed by this turn of events. But gradually she comes to appreciate her luxurious surroundings and glamorous new life. She also grows to respect Sir William, who marries her and explains the reasons for Britain's war against Napoleon. When Horatio Nelson arrives in Naples, Emma is soon deeply attracted to him and impressed by his passionate insistence upon resisting Napoleon's wars of conquest. She leaves Sir William to live with Nelson, who is also married. Their idyllic life together is threatened by the continuing war and their infidelity to their spouses. The Admiralty contacts Sir William and he graciously explains to Emma that it (not he) has ordered her to go to Cairo and Nelson to return to Britain. She informs Nelson and they have a passionate farewell. However, both end up in England. When Lady Nelson meets Emma, she is less forgiving than Sir William.

Following Nelson's maiden speech at the House of Lords, the crowds spot both Lady Nelson and Emma and gossip starts as to which he will go to first afterwards. It is here that they say "There is that Hamilton woman". Nelson chooses his wife, but Emma faints, and Lady Nelson ushers the carriage away. Against the pleas of his father, a clergyman of the Church of England, Lord Nelson separates from the enraged Lady Nelson, who vows she will never give him a divorce.

Emma bears Nelson's child, but Nelson is called back to sea. Meanwhile, Sir William dies and Emma is left impoverished. When Nelson finds out, he is enraged and buys her a country house, where they live together.

Napoleon declares himself Emperor of the French and the war restarts. Nelson leaves to confront the French Navy off the coast of Spain. The fleet sing "Heart of Oak" as Nelson raises the signal "England expects that every man will do his duty". Captain Hardy warns Nelson that wearing his multitude of decorations could attract snipers, but Nelson insists, as he earned them in combat.

The Battle of Trafalgar begins, a huge, ferocious battle between the opposing fleets. Nelson is shot through the spine by a sniper and taken below deck. "Poor Emma, what will become of her?" he muses. Outside, Admiral Villeneuve's flagship surrenders and the fighting continues despite 14 enemy ships destroyed or captured. Nelson orders them to continue until 20 are lost. After 18, he says, "Thank God. I have done my duty" and dies.

In England, Hardy goes to Emma and describes the battle, but starts weeping and reveals Nelson's death. Considering her life over, she spirals into poverty and alcoholism.

== Cast ==
- Vivien Leigh as Emma, Lady Hamilton
- Laurence Olivier as Admiral Horatio Nelson
- Alan Mowbray as Sir William Hamilton
- Gladys Cooper as Lady Frances Nelson
- Heather Angel as Mary Smith
- Gilbert Emery as Lord Spencer
- Ronald Sinclair as Josiah
- Norma Drury as Queen of Naples
- Juliette Compton as Lady Spencer
- Sara Allgood as Mrs Cadogan-Lyon
- Henry Wilcoxon as Captain Hardy
- Halliwell Hobbes as Rev. Edmund Nelson
- Miles Mander as Lord Keith
- Luis Alberni as King of Naples
- Olaf Hytten as Gavin
- Guy Kingsford as Captain Troubridge

== Production ==
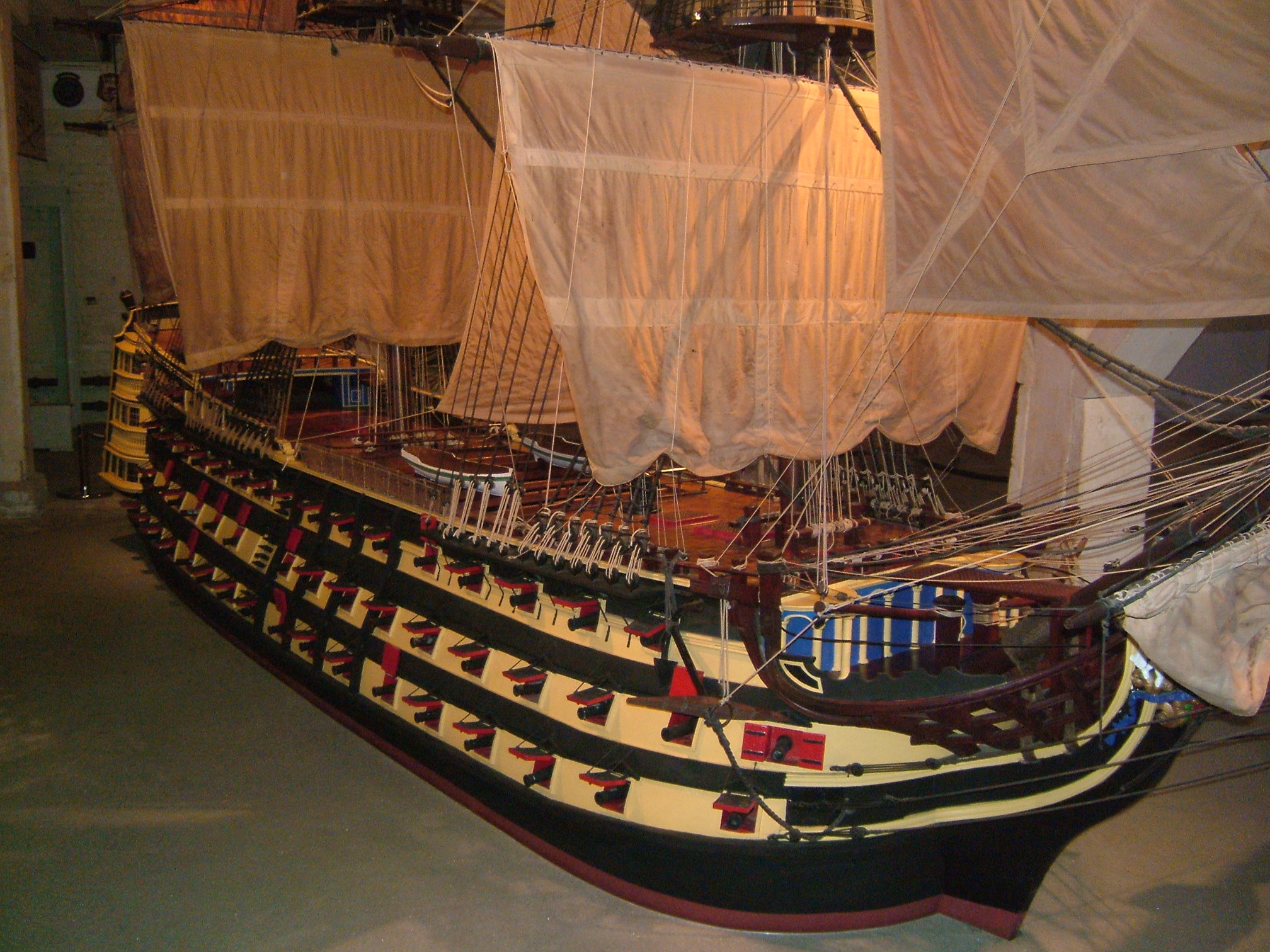
HMS Victory made for That Hamilton Woman

Shot in the United States during September and October 1940, That Hamilton Woman defines Britain's struggle against Napoleon in terms of resistance to a dictator who seeks to dominate the world. The film was intended to parallel the current situation in Europe and to serve as propaganda at a time, before the attack on Pearl Harbor, when the U.S. was still formally neutral. Korda's brother Vincent designed the sets, creating Sir William Hamilton's palatial home that looked out over the sea of Naples, as well as the interiors of Merton Place, the home Emma and Nelson shared when they returned to England. On a tight budget, Korda completed filming in only five weeks, working from an original screenplay by Walter Reisch and R.C. Sherriff. Originally to be titled The Enchantress, the film was first released in Britain as Lady Hamilton.

Stars Vivien Leigh and Laurence Olivier were newlyweds at the time of filming and were considered a "dream couple". The film's tagline was The Year's Most Exciting Team of Screen Lovers! That Hamilton Woman is the last of three films they made together and their only film as a married couple. Korda also produced their first film, Fire Over England.

Because of the strict Motion Picture Production Code, the two lovers never appear in bed together or ever even partially undressed together. Before the affair begins Emma sits on her bed, wherein Nelson is recovering from exhaustion, to feed him some soup. According to K.R.M. Short's study of the film, the major problem for the Production Code office was not the scenes showing romantic encounters: It was the script's treating an "adulterous relationship as a romance instead of a sin".

The supporting cast of That Hamilton Woman includes Sara Allgood as Emma's mother, Henry Wilcoxon as Captain Hardy, Gladys Cooper as Lady Nelson, and Alan Mowbray as William Hamilton, Emma's husband, the British ambassador to Naples and a collector of objets d'art.

During the filming a wad of flame fell from a torch directly on Olivier's head, setting his wig afire. Wilcoxon, standing right beside him, tried and failed to extinguish the blaze. Finally he wrested the wig from Olivier's head, but both his hands were badly burned, while Olivier's eyebrows were scorched.

While That Hamilton Woman was marketed as historical romance, its subtext is war propaganda. In July 1941, the isolationist America First Committee (AFC) targeted That Hamilton Woman and three other major Hollywood feature films (The Great Dictator, Chaplin/United Artists, 1940; Foreign Correspondent, Wanger/United Artists, 1940; The Mortal Storm, MGM, 1940) as productions that "seemed to be preparing Americans for war". The AFC called on the American public to boycott theaters showing these movies.

Informed of Napoleon's promise of peace, Nelson replies in a speech that clearly links the historical narrative to the contemporary threat of a dictator at war:

"Gentlemen, you will never make peace with Napoleon… Napoleon cannot be master of the world until he has smashed us up, and believe me, gentlemen, he means to be master of the world! You cannot make peace with dictators. You have to destroy them–-wipe them out!"

— That Hamilton Woman

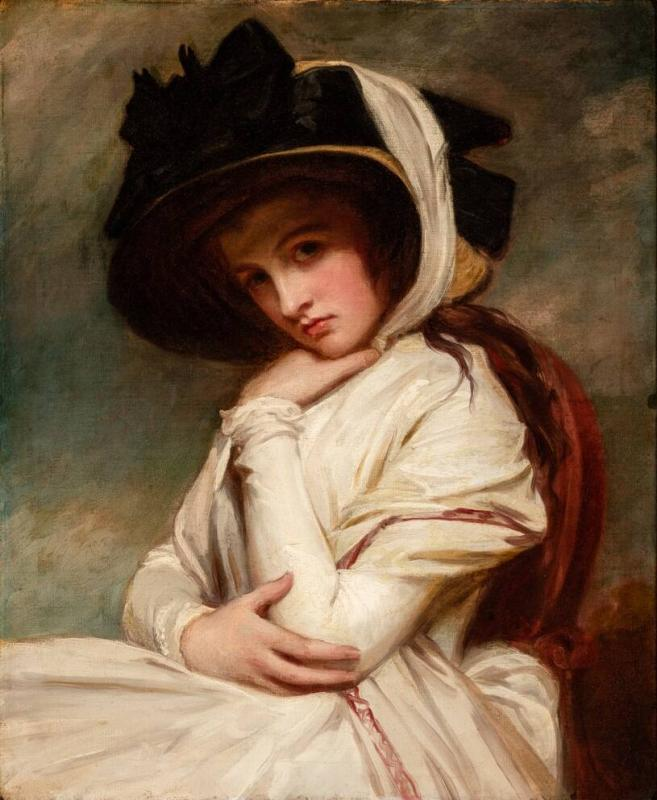
Emma Hart, later Lady Hamilton, in a Straw Hat, c. 1782–84, by George Romney

== Reception ==
The movie premiered at the Radio City Music Hall, and in his review of That Hamilton Woman for The New York Times, Bosley Crowther said the film is "just a running account of a famous love affair, told with deep sympathy for the participants against a broad historic outline of the times... Perhaps if it had all been condensed and contrived with less manifest awe, the effect would have been more exciting and the love story would have had more poignancy. As it is, the little drama in the picture is dissipated over many expansive scenes; compassion is lost in marble halls." Of the two stars, Crowther wrote, "Vivien Leigh's entire performance as Lady Hamilton is delightful to behold. All of the charm and grace and spirit which Miss Leigh contains is beautifully put to use to capture the subtle spell which Emma most assuredly must have weaved. Laurence Olivier's Nelson is more studied and obviously contrived, and his appearance is very impressive, with the famous dead eye and empty sleeve."

Critical sources usually mention that That Hamilton Woman was Winston Churchill's favorite film. (Note: Film historian Stacey Olster claims that it was Winston Churchill who suggested the story of the Hamilton/Nelson romance because of his interest in a vehicle "that would promote Britain's historic role as a scourge of tyrants with Adolf Hitler equated with Napoleon Bonaparte.") During the Atlantic Conference of August 1941, Churchill and his party aboard HMS Prince of Wales screened the film again and again, and it brought Churchill to tears.

In her research on the subject, film historian Professor Stacey Olster reveals that at the time the film was made, Alexander Korda's New York offices were "supplying cover to MI-5 agents gathering intelligence on both German activities in the United States and isolationist sentiments among makers of American foreign policy." According to Olivier's biographer Anthony Holden, That Hamilton Woman "became Exhibit A in a case brought against Korda by the Senate Foreign Relations Committee. The Committee had accused him of operating an espionage and propaganda center for Britain in the United States—a charge Korda only escaped by virtue of the fact that his scheduled appearance before the committee on December 12, 1941 was preempted by the Japanese bombing of Pearl Harbor five days earlier".

=== Box office ===
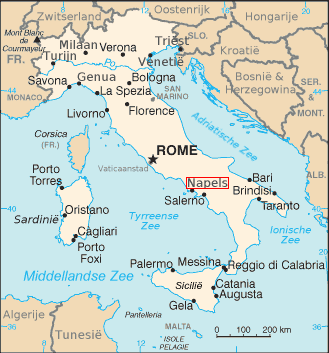
Map of Italy showing Naples

According to Kinematograph Weekly, the film was the fifth most popular movie at the British box office in 1941, after 49th Parallel, The Great Dictator, Pimpernel Smith and All This, and Heaven Too.

The film was given a successful re-release in Britain in 1944.

== Awards and honors ==
At the 14th Academy Awards, That Hamilton Woman was nominated for four Oscars and won for Best Sound.

Nominated

- Best Art Direction (Vincent Korda, Julia Heron)
- Best Cinematography (Rudolph Maté)
- Best Effects, Special Effects (Lawrence W. Butler, William A. Wilmarth)

Won

- Best Sound, Recording (Jack Whitney)

== See also ==
- Napoleonic Wars

Films about Lady Hamilton
- Lady Hamilton (1921), a German silent film directed by Richard Oswald
- The Divine Lady (1929), a Vitaphone sound film with no dialogue, directed by Frank Lloyd
- Emma Hamilton (1968), a co-production between Italy, West Germany, France and the United States, directed by Christian-Jacque
- Bequest to the Nation (1973), Hal Wallis Productions, based on the 1970 Terence Rattigan play A Bequest to the Nation, directed by James Cellan Jones. The film was released in the United States under the title The Nelson Affair.
- Emma and Nelson (2014—In development). Kate Williams' biography of Emma Hamilton, England's Mistress: The Infamous Life of Emma Hamilton (2006), has been optioned for a film by Picture Palace.
