= Sudo Room =

Sudo Room is a free hackerspace based in Oakland, California located in the Omni Commons
