= Nsumi =

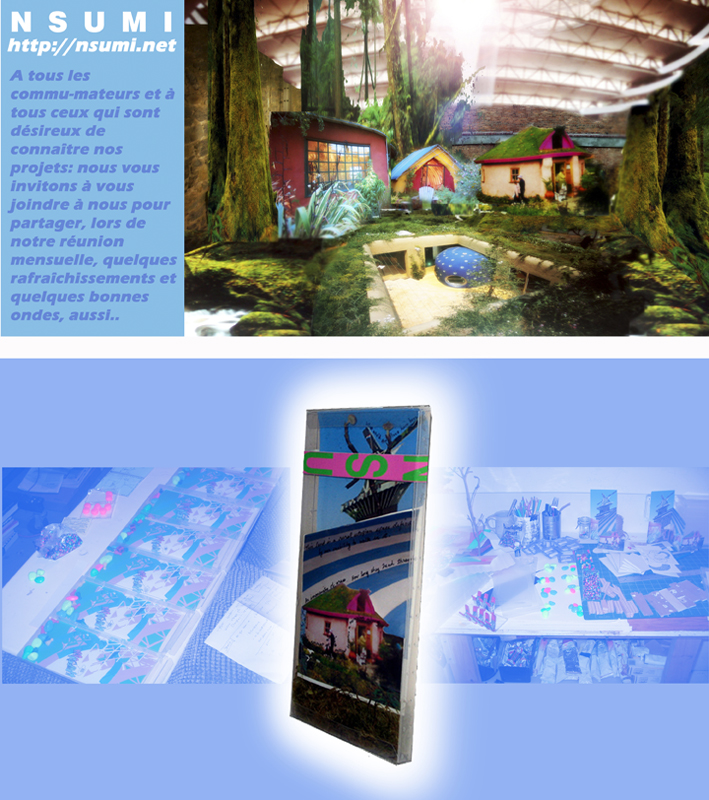
Commune Starter Kits, 2003.

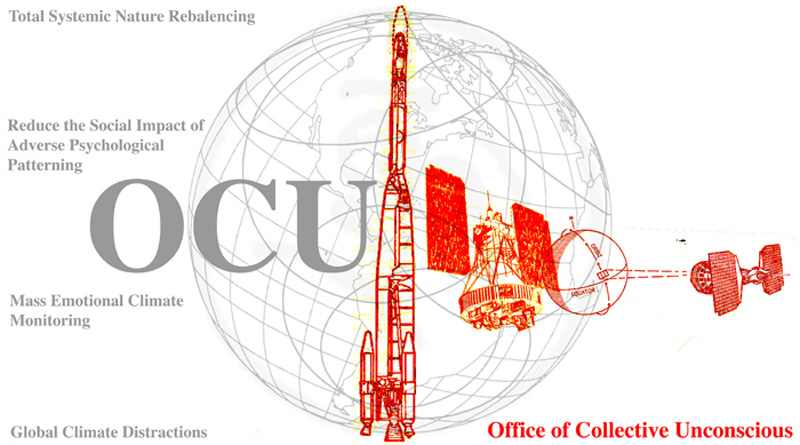
Office of Collective Unconscious from The Institute for Wishful Thinking exhibition at Momenta Gallery, 2011.

Nsumi, or "Nsumi Collective" is an art collective, initially formed as a New School student association called Nsumiscope in the fall of 2001 the week directly following September 11th. Their projects last for years at a time, and are not always documented or publicized.

Nsumi's work occurs mostly within the back-end of the art world where ideas wobble around before becoming embodied as art. Members of Nsumi have claimed that the group spawns art collectives and experimental groups through a gift economy consulting project and other tactics, such as workshops, art exhibitions and performances, zines, street classes, academic research, and public interventions. The group's changing membership has included educators, artists, scientists, architects, landscape designers, curators, collectors, and others.

Nsumi operates fluidly, frequently collaborating with artists and collectives including Trevor Paglen, Brandon Ballengée, Rainer Ganahl, AUNTS Collective and Peter Fend, in addition to those who participate anonymously.

Their insider/outsider practice involves a range of disciplines including traditional art, trend analysis and Network theory, urban planning and mapping, interventions within ecosystems, grassroots political organizing and prefigurative politics.

Sometimes Nsumi fully or partially joins other art groups, adopting an individual or quasi-individual identity. Occasionally the group will exchange or swap members with different collectives, bring on temporary members, or work with artists who join the group for one-off events and exhibitions. Nsumi blurs its own boundaries since it is unclear which identity the group is operating through at a given moment or who exactly is involved. Nsumi operates under different monikers, such as Lightning Chasers, Black Magic Guild and Nsumi Group, and has been known to appear in the same group exhibition under multiple individual and group names.

Nsumi also appears in more conventional art exhibitions at galleries, universities and museums including the Queens Museum, Momenta Gallery, Deitch Projects and the Center for Architecture in New York City. Their work has appeared in Satya magazine, ARTE Television and TRACKS TV in Europe, Total Theatre Magazine, The New York Times, Archinect, The Economist, the New York Sun, and Art News.

Between 2013 and 2014 Nsumi launched two projects that blur the lines between creative production and grassroots politics. Banner Action (2013) is a performance involving protest banners, formal decentralization, semiotics and memetics. Oubliettes (2014) is a project about prison abolition and the human rights crimes at the MDC federal prison in Sunset Park, Brooklyn, following up on their 2005 collaboration with Trevor Paglen. The project resulted in a protest outside MDC prison on New Year's Eve, December 2014.
