= Petro Wodkins =

- Born: Russia
- Education: Unknown
- Known for: Performance Art, New media art, Street art, Sculpture Photography, Video Art, Satire, Social commentary
- Notable work: Armani Diapers Pissing Petro; Closed until further Notice; The Price of Art Sound of Power
- Movement: Conceptual art
- Website: petrowodkins.com

Petro Wodkins is a Russian artist and performer, known for a series of art happenings covered by global media.

His name is a pseudonym that derives from the Russian artist Kuzma Petrov-Vodkin (1878, Khvalynsk, now Saratov Oblast – February 15, 1939, Leningrad). His date of birth and background is uncertain.

His provocative and subversive art has its roots in street art and media art. Wodkins works in a collaborative way and often invites photographers, directors and creatives to be part of the art works.

== Notable artworks ==
=== Sound of Power ===
Sound of Power (SOP) is an art series where Wodkins portrays powerful people who, in their own way, played the world like instruments. According to Wodkins Sound of Power is a contemporary reincarnation of classical busts turned into powerful speakers and his first attempt to create "useful art". Wodkins explains this artwork as a way to "play the people who play the world". Busts of Vladimir Putin, Kim Jong-Un, Margaret Thatcher, Donald Trump and Pablo Escobar were made in an edition of 100 pieces.

=== My Gift to Robert ===
In the beginning of 2014 Wodkins built a huge golden statue of himself as a gift to Robert Mugabe. It included the rap song entitled "My Gift to Robert" with lyrics "I'm bad for my country, but good for myself" and "My name is Mugabe my face top five, if don't agree I'll burn you alive". Wodkins traveled the streets of Zimbabwe with his statue, playing My Gift to Robert. According to Wodkins this went well until he arrived in the city center of Harare, were the statue was confiscated after only five minutes. Wodkins fled the country before being caught.

=== Armani Diapers ===
In the name of Emporio Armani Wodkins produced fake Armani Diapers, marketing it on a specially created web page for Russian Armani. Wodkins managed to trick some blogs as well as media outlets Die Welt and PRiv'et Russia on RT into believing that the diapers were real. This until Armani denied being part of the diapers, threatening to take legal action.

=== Pissing Petro ===
Wodkins replaced the Manneken Pis in Brussels with a statue of himself urinating. The statue was taken into custody by the authorities. Reports of the street art went viral in Europe, Asia and the United States. The art work was described as one of the most bold and daring performances of street art seen in a while.

=== Closed until Further Notice ===
Closed until Further Notice is a series of artworks where Wodkins claims to close down contemporary art museums by creating fake webpages, sending out press releases as well as barricading himself outside museum entrances. He has performed this for Louisiana Museum of Modern Art (Denmark) and MUMOK (Austria).

=== Art market ===
In the artwork "Price of Art" Wodkins investigated the art world's relationship to money. Wodkins acted like the businessman Petr Fomin, representing Emomalii Rahmon, the president of Tajikistan, trying to buy art. Tajikistan is a poor and corrupt country and Rahmon has ruled for 19 years. Wodkins' question was whether this would affect art dealers' willingness to sell art to the President - being paid from off offshore bank accounts, leaving no trace of the buyer, and arranging for discrete delivery of the art, including pieces by Ai Wei Wei, via the free-port of Geneva. It transpired that galleries Lisson Gallery and Hauser & Wirth were willing to sell art under such conditions to Rahmon.
