= Church of Euthanasia =

Religious anti-natalist organization

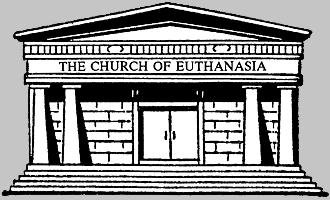
- The official symbol of the Church of Euthanasia is a representation of a Greek temple with four pillars
- Abbreviation: CoE
- Headquarters: Boston, Massachusetts, United States
- Founder: Chris Korda, Robert Kimberk
- Origin: 1992; Registered in the state of Delaware
- Official website: churchofeuthanasia.org

The Church of Euthanasia (CoE) is a religion and antinatalist activist organization founded by Chris Korda and Robert Kimberk (Pastor Kim) in Boston, Massachusetts in 1992. As stated on its website, it is "a non-profit educational foundation devoted to restoring balance between Humans and the remaining species on Earth." Its members affirm that this can only turn into a reality by a massive voluntary population reduction, which will depend on a leap in human consciousness to species-awareness. According to Korda, it is likely that this church is the world's only anti-human religion. Its most popular slogan is "Save the Planet, Kill Yourself", and its founding ideology is set in one commandment, "Thou Shalt not Procreate", and four main pillars: suicide ("optional but encouraged"), abortion ("may be required to avoid procreation"), cannibalism ("mandatory if you insist on eating flesh" but only if someone is already dead), and sodomy ("any sexual act not intended for procreation"). The church stresses population reduction by voluntary means only, and rejects murder and eugenics as a means of achieving it.

The church promotes its environmental views. They also utilize sermons, art performances, public demonstrations, culture jamming, music, publicity stunts, and direct action to promote their idea of Earth's unsustainable population. They consider their methods similar to those of the Dadaist movement, finding the modern world so absurd that the means needed to spread their message to the public must be absurd themselves. The Church of Euthanasia is also notorious for its conflicts with anti-abortion Christian activists. The group's slogans include "Save the Planet, Kill Yourself", "Six Billion Humans Can't Be Wrong", and "Eat a Queer Fetus for Jesus".

In its heyday the CoE claimed hundreds of official members and thousands of subscribers. Since 2015, the group has become idle but their website remains online as an archive. Some founders of the group, including Korda, continue their antinatalist activism.

== Notable incidents ==
Korda appeared on an episode of The Jerry Springer Show titled "I Want to Join a Suicide Cult", which aired in 1997.

Following the September 11 attacks, the church posted on its website a four-minute music video titled I Like to Watch, combining hardcore pornography with footage of the attacks and the collapse of the World Trade Center. Over the video played an electronic soundtrack recorded by Korda with the lyrics, "People dive into the street / While I play with my meat" and "My steel melted and my tower's coming down." It also showed a man ejaculating and then cleaning himself with an American flag. Korda described the project as reflecting her "contempt for and frustration with the profound ugliness of the modern industrial world."

In 2003, a 52-year-old woman used the church's instructions on "how to kill yourself" by asphyxiation with helium and died by suicide in St. Louis County, Missouri, resulting in legal threats against the organization.

== See also ==
- Animal rights
- Climate change
- Holocene extinction
- Misanthropy
- Negative population growth
- Neo-Dada
- Voluntary Human Extinction Movement
