= Improv Everywhere =

Comedic performance art group based in New York City

- Founded: New York, 2001
- Founder: Charlie Todd
- Type: Organization
- Purpose: Comedic performance art group
- Region served: US and worldwide
- Method: Various missions and events organized locally and globally
- Website: improveverywhere.com

Improv Everywhere (often abbreviated IE) is a comedic performance art group based in New York City, formed in 2001 by Charlie Todd. Its slogan is "We Cause Scenes".

The group carries out pranks, which they call "missions", in public places. The stated goal of these missions is to cause scenes of "chaos and joy." Some of the group's missions use hundreds or even thousands of performers and are similar to flash mobs, while other missions utilize only a handful of performers. Improv Everywhere has stated that they do not identify their work with the term flash mob, in part because the group was created two years prior to the flash mob trend, and the group has an apolitical nature.

While Improv Everywhere was created years before YouTube, the group has grown in notoriety since joining the site in April 2006. To date, Improv Everywhere's videos have been viewed over 470 million times on YouTube. They have over 1.9 million YouTube subscribers. In 2007, the group shot a television pilot for NBC. In May 2009, HarperCollins released a book about Improv Everywhere, Causing a Scene The book, written by founder Charlie Todd and senior agent Alex Scordelis, is a behind-the-scenes look at some of the group's stunts. In 2013, a feature-length documentary about Improv Everywhere premiered at the South By Southwest Festival in Austin, Texas. The film, titled We Cause Scenes, was released digitally on iTunes, Netflix and other platforms in 2014.

In 2019, Improv Everywhere produced the Disney+ live-action series Pixar In Real Life, which premiered on 12 November 2019, with eleven episodes released monthly.

== Background ==
After graduating from the University of North Carolina at Chapel Hill, Todd started the group in August 2001 after playing a prank in a Manhattan bar with some friends that involved him pretending to be musician Ben Folds. Later that year Todd started taking classes at the Upright Citizens Brigade Theatre in New York City where he first met most of the "Senior Agents" of Improv Everywhere. The owners of the theatre, The Upright Citizens Brigade (UCB), had a television series from 1998 to 2000 on Comedy Central. While primarily a sketch comedy show, the UCB often filmed their characters in public places with hidden cameras and showed the footage under the end credits. Both the UCB's show and their teachings on improv have been influential to Improv Everywhere. Todd currently performs on a house team at the UCBT in New York, where he also taught for many years.

== Missions / events ==
All the missions share a certain modus operandi: Members ("agents") play their roles entirely straight, not breaking character or betraying that they are acting. IE claims the missions are benevolent, aiming to give the observers a laugh and a positive experience.

=== Frozen Grand Central ===
Improv Everywhere's most popular YouTube video is "Frozen Grand Central", which has received over 35 million views. The two-minute video depicts 207 IE Agents freezing in place simultaneously for five minutes in New York's Grand Central Terminal. The video was listed as number 49 in Urlesque's 100 Most Iconic Internet Videos. Martin Bashir declared on Nightline that the video was "one of the funniest moments ever captured on tape." According to Charlie Todd, the prank has been recreated by fans in 100 cities around the world.

=== Fake U2 Concert ===
On 21 May 2005, IE staged a fake U2 street concert on a rooftop in New York hours before the real U2 were scheduled to perform at Madison Square Garden. Just like at the filming of the band's Where the Streets Have No Name video in 1987, the police eventually shut the performance down, but not before IE was able to exhaust their four-song repertoire and get most of the way through an encore repeat of "Vertigo". The crowd, even those who had realized that this was a prank, shouted "one more song!", and then "let them play!" when the police officers arrived. This mission was number 23 on the VH1 countdown of the "40 Greatest Pranks."

=== Look Up More ===
This 2005 performance piece, marking the biggest mission to that date both in logistics and personnel size, on line at Youtube with about 2 million views; shows 70 agents performing timely choreographed moves while situated in each of the 70 windows in a large six-floored Manhattan retail store. The performers were all clothed in all black and were instructed to espouse directions (written down on palmsized sheets) unique to their spot (window). The performance lasted about 4 minutes and included a solo dance by three performers and the spelling of 'Look Up More' with 4-foot tall letters held up by 10 of the performers.
