= Andrew Boyd =

Andrew Boyd may refer to:

- Andrew Boyd (bishop) (1566–1636), Bishop of Argyll
- Andrew Kennedy Hutchison Boyd (1825–1899), Scottish minister and writer
- Andrew Hunter Boyd (1849–1935), Maryland jurist
- Andrew Boyd (fencer) (1910–2002), American Olympic fencer
- Andrew Boyd (author) (born 1962), American author and activist
- Drew Boyd, fictional character on Queer as Folk

== See also ==
- Andrew Boyd Cummings (1830–1863), U.S. naval officer in the American Civil War
