= Tactical frivolity =

Political protest using humor

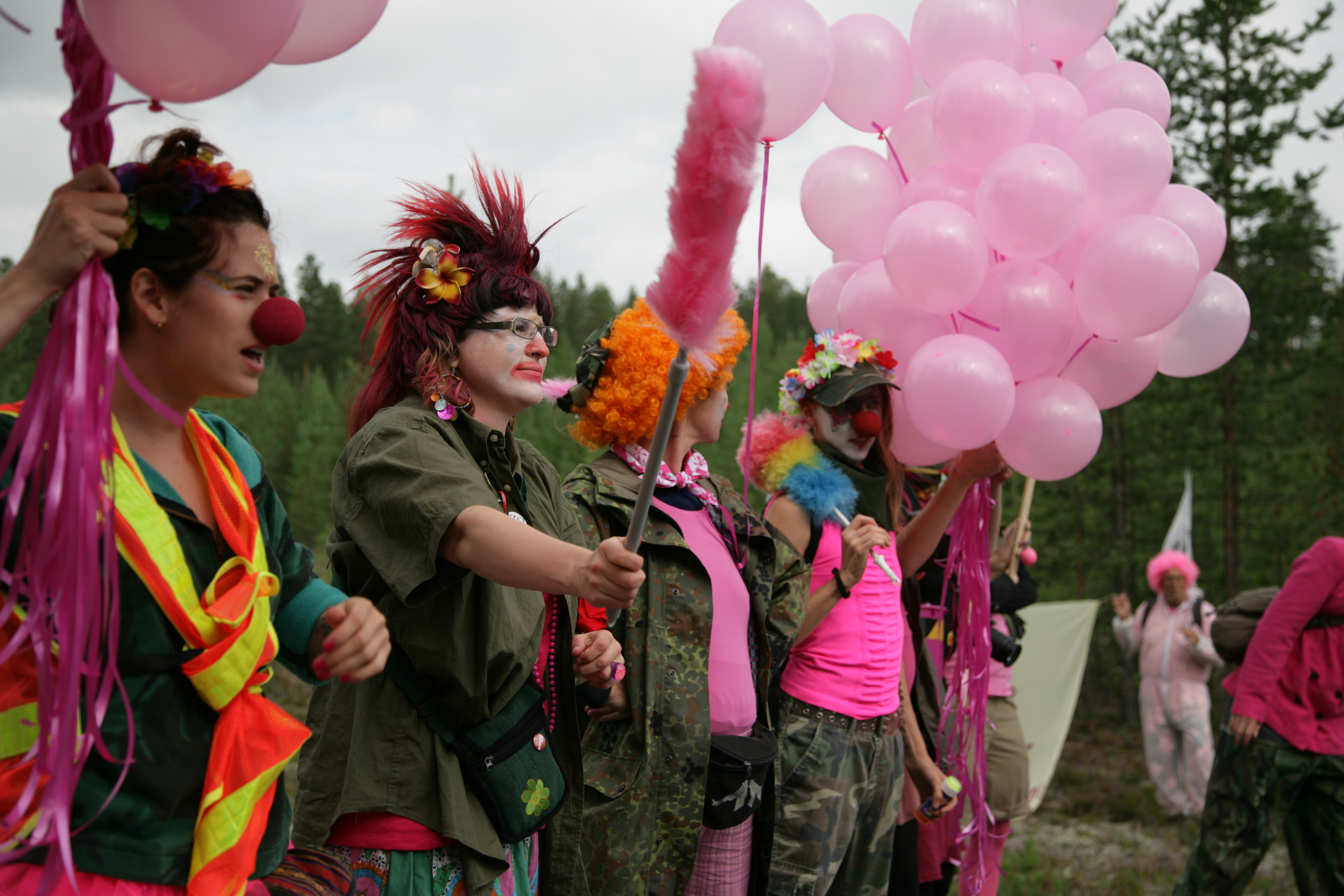
Swedish anti-war protestors blocking a road while dressed as clowns

Tactical frivolity is a form of public protest involving humour; often including peaceful non-compliance with authorities, carnival and whimsical antics. Humour has played a role in political protests at least as far back as the Classical period in ancient Greece, or more recently with some guerrilla theater. In the 1990s, the term tactical frivolity gained currency for using humour in opposing perceived political injustice. Generally, the term is used to denote a whimsical, nonconfrontational approach rather than aggressive mocking or cutting jokes.

== History of humour in political protest ==
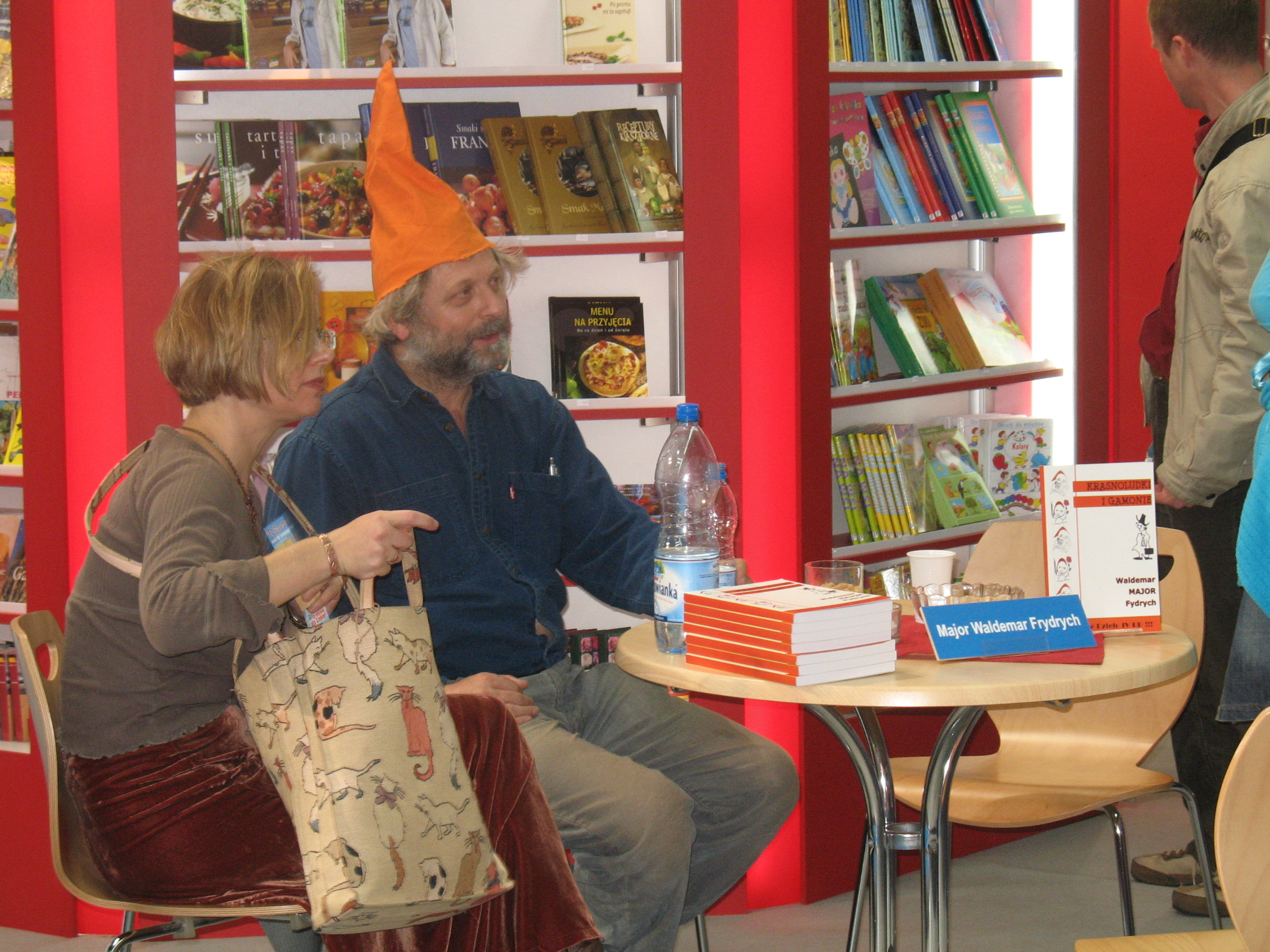
Major Waldemar Fydrych founder of the Orange Alternative, seen wearing the movement's trademark elf hat at Kraków Book Fair October 2006

The study of humour by social historians did not become popular until the early 1980s and the literature on this subject studying periods before the 20th century is relatively sparse. An exception is the frequently cited Rabelais and His World by Russian scholar Mikhail Bakhtin. The work discusses the life and times of the writer and satirist François Rabelais with emphases on what the author considers to be the powerful role of humour in medieval and early times. Carnivals, Satire and the French folk custom of Charivari were discussed as mediums that allowed the lower classes to use humour to highlight unjust behaviour by the upper classes. These humorous protests were generally tolerated by the ruling authorities. Examples of the use of humour for political protest even from Classical times, such as the play Lysistrata by ancient Greek dramatist Aristophanes, have been described as "Rabeleisan protest". Studies of hunter gather tribes thought to have systems of social organisation that have changed little since prehistoric times, have found that ridicule or anger is used by many tribes to oppose any individual who tries to assume authority in a way that violates the tribe's egalitarian norms. Tribes observed to show this behaviour include the !Kung, Mbuti, Naskapi and Hazda. An example of a political protest making extensive use of humour in early modern times was the 17th century British movement, the Levellers. There is much more extensive literature covering the use of humour by the protest movements which emerged in the 20th century.

In the United States, Abbie Hoffman, Jerry Rubin, and the Yippies were well-known users of frivolous tactics. Active in the 1960s and 1970s, their actions included dropping money onto the trading floor of the New York Stock Exchange, running a pig as a candidate for president, and "levitating" the Pentagon.

One of the earliest protest groups whose use of humour has been specifically described as "tactical frivolity" is the Orange Alternative, a movement that emerged in Poland during the early 1980s as a part of the broader Solidarity campaign. They made extensive use of visual jokes and theatrical stunts to protest against oppression by the authorities. A common theme was to dress up as elves (sometimes translated dwarves or gnomes). Orange Alternative have been described as the most "influential of the solidarity factions", central to enabling the overall movement to prevail, due in part to the success their comedic "happenings" enjoyed in attracting the attention of the world's media. A protest movement described as partly responsible for popularising the contemporary use of "Tactical Frivolity" is Reclaim the Streets (RTS). They formed in 1991 in Great Britain, inspired in part by the anti-road protests of the previous decades and in part by the Situationists. As the 1990s advanced, RTS inspired splinter groups in other countries across the world, and was heavily involved in organising the international Carnival against Capitalism—an anti-capitalism event held in many cities simultaneously on June 18, 1999. Carnival against Capitalism, frequently known as J18, is sometimes credited as being the first of the major international anti-capitalist protests. RTS have reported that many of their organisers were inspired by independently reading the work of Bakhtin.

== In international anti-capitalist protests ==
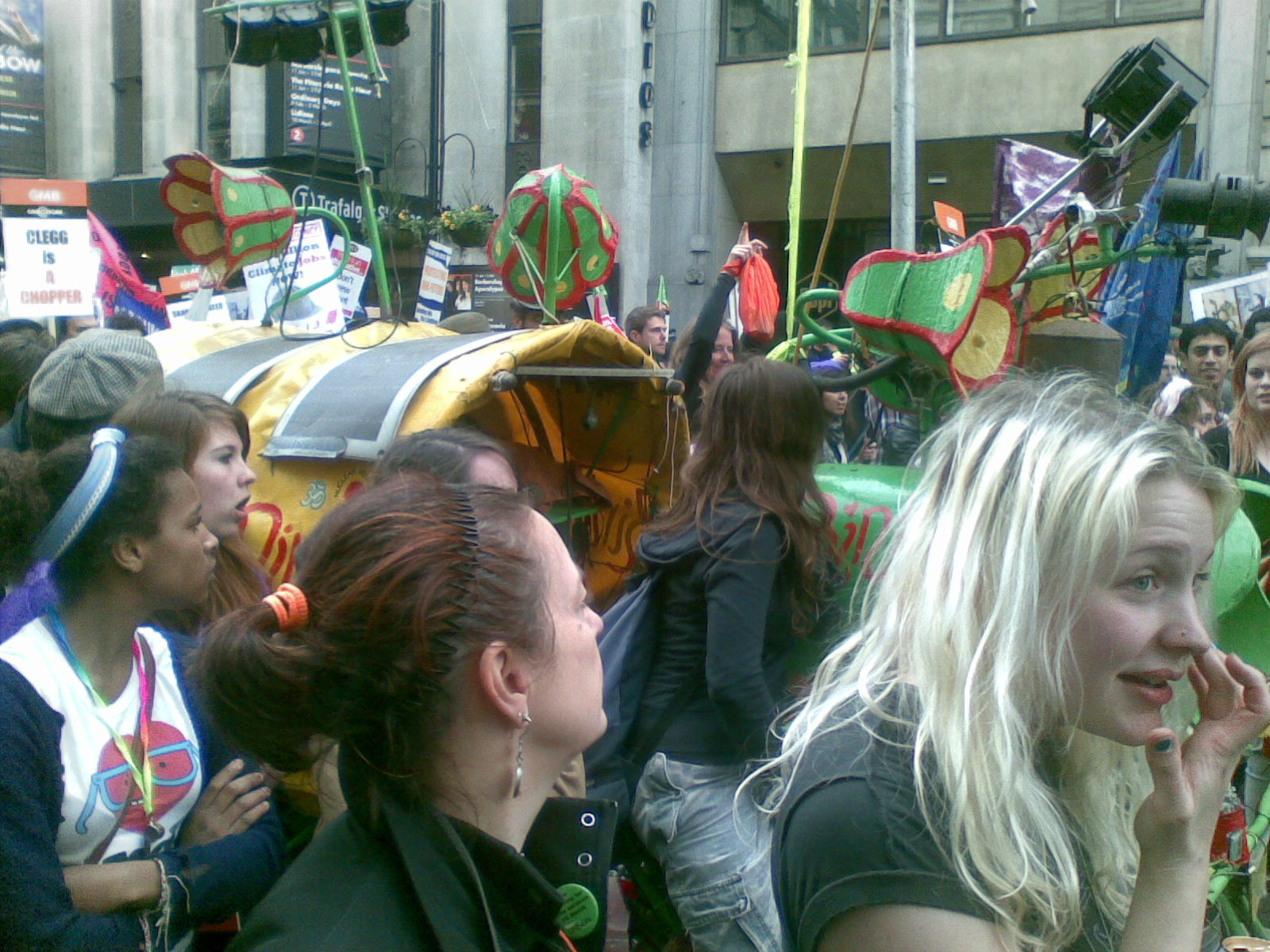
A tactical frivolity float, surrounded by protestors at the 2011 London anti-cuts protest

Large scale International anti-capitalist protests are widely seen as dawning between 1998 and 2000 with events such as the protests at the Birmingham 1998 G8, J18, the Seattle 1999 WTO protests and the Prague 2000 IMF protests.

The 1999 Seattle demonstrations saw extensive violent clashes with the police. For the 2000 protest in Prague, demonstrators divided themselves into three broad groupings based in part on the way they wished to engage with the authorities. There was a "Yellow march" for traditional nonviolent protest, a "Blue march" for those who were up for physically taking on the police, and a "Silver and Pink" group which is described as employing "tactical frivolity", this group being the most successful in terms of penetrating the security cordon around the IMF meeting. Attending Prague was also a small group specifically calling itself "Tactical Frivolity", which consisted of a Samba band plus thirteen women from Yorkshire dressed as pink fairies.

Ten months later, a group of protesters dressed in carnival outfits and again calling themselves the Pink and Silver bloc, or Pink Fairies, used the term "tactical frivolity" to describe their own methods when protesting at the 27th G8 summit in Genoa. These included waving "magic fairy wands" at the police and training "radical cheerleaders," as well as the deployment of a "revolutionary spaghetti catapult" designed to "splatter the leaders with pasta". The device failed to hit any leaders with spaghetti, but, according to journalist Johann Hari, the Pink Fairies did succeed in causing mass laughter among the crowds.

In the early 21st century, tactical frivolity was often used at much smaller events than global summits; for example, the group Billionaires for Bush would stage humorous events at US Republican conventions. Similar actions and pranks were staged in Australia during the 2004 federal election by the John Howard Ladies’ Auxiliary Fan Club, named for the country's conservative Prime Minister. According to David Graeber, this upswell in the use of humorous protest tactics can be traced in part to the Yippies of the 1960s and the Zapatista, which began operations in the 1990s.

At the 2005 G8 summit in Scotland, tactical frivolity was again used by protesters such as the Clandestine Insurgent Rebel Clown Army a group whose theatrical and carnival like performances succeeded in attracting considerable media attention and were funded by Arts Council England. The large scale use of tactical frivolity at the 2001 and 2005 G8 protests failed to deliver any tangible change in policy, but the method continued to be used, for example at protests held concerning air travel at Heathrow, England during 2007.

Tactical frivolity was used at the 2011 London anti-cuts protest. Some of the tactical frivolity protestors integrated fully into the main march; others trailed in the wake of black bloc anarchists, while remaining non violent themselves. Adbusters, the magazine credited for starting the global Occupy movement, called for Occupiers to use tactical frivolity, though the method has only been used sporadically. Author and academic Luke Bretherton has suggested that tactical frivolity allows protestors to represent the otherwise inexpressible sacred power of imagination, which is achieved partly through the "use of huge puppets, dance and street theatre".

== Ku Klux Klan counter protests ==
Klan marches reliably attract counter protests.

- Molly Ivins describes one: "A recent Ku Klux Klan rally in Austin produced an eccentric counter- demonstration. When the fifty Klansmen appeared (they were bused in from Waco) in front of the state capitol, they were greeted by five thousand locals who had turned out for a 'Moon the Klan' rally. Citizens dropped trou both singly and in groups, occasionally producing a splendid wave effect. It was a swell do."
- In North Carolina, a group of clowns shouting wife power and throwing white flour outnumbered and outshouted the Klansmen.
- In South Carolina, Matt Buck humiliated the KKK simply by walking with them while performing on his sousaphone.

== Portland ICE protests ==
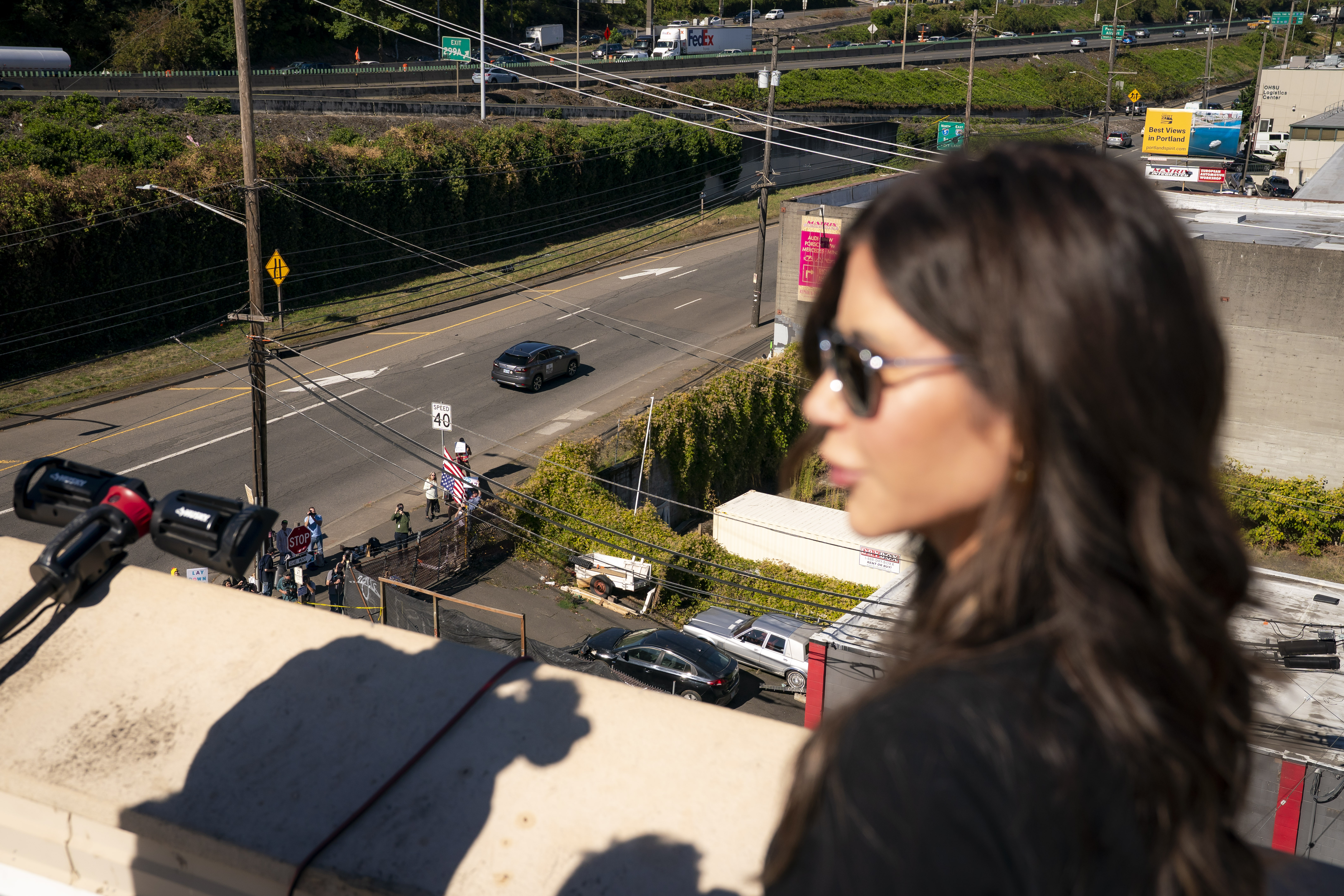
Kristi Noem watches a small protest from atop the Portland, Oregon ICE facility

Protesting Immigration and Customs (ICE) presence, Portland's response to counter federal officials' misleading narrative–which has characterized the city as a war zone–leaned on improv theater and ridiculous costumes.

Dressing-up "dismantles their narrative a little bit," Jack Dickinson, also known as the "Portland Chicken," told Willamette Week. "It becomes much harder to take them seriously when they have to post a video saying Kristi Noem is up on the balcony staring over the Antifa Army and it's, like, eight journalists and five protesters and one of them is in a chicken suit."

== Other ICE protests ==
Protests in April, 2026 at ICE facilities outside Broadview in Chicago included as many as 350 dildos in what protesters called it "Operation Dildo Blitz".

== See also ==
- ACT UP
- Anarchism and violence
- Clandestine Insurgent Rebel Clown Army
- Culture jamming
- Fathers for Justice
- Front Deutscher Äpfel
- Glitter bombing
- Kabouters
- Pink Chaddi Campaign
- Protest art
- Queer Nation
- Rhythms of Resistance
- The arts and politics
- Wavy Gravy
