= Six Characters in Search of an Author =

1921 Italian play

- Written by: Luigi Pirandello
- Characters: Director/Manager; Actors; Stage technicians; Father; Mother; Stepdaughter; Son; Boy; Child
- Original language: Italian
- Genre: Absurdism, metatheatre
- Setting: A theatre

Premiere
- Date premiered: 1921
- Place premiered: Teatro Valle, Rome

Six Characters in Search of an Author (Italian: Sei personaggi in cerca d'autore [ˈsɛi persoˈnaddʒi in ˈtʃerka dauˈtoːre]) is an Italian play by Luigi Pirandello, written and first performed in 1921. An absurdist metatheatric play about the relationship among authors, their characters, and theatre practitioners, it premiered at the Teatro Valle in Rome to a mixed reception, with shouts from the audience of "Manicomio!" ("Madhouse!") and "Incommensurabile!" ("Off the scale!"), a reaction to the play's illogical progression. Reception improved at subsequent performances, especially after Pirandello provided for the play's third edition, published in 1925, a foreword clarifying its structure and ideas.

The play was given in an English translation in the West End of London in February 1922, and had its American premiere in October of that year at the Princess Theatre, New York.

== Characters ==
The characters are:

- The Father
- The Mother
- The Stepdaughter
- The Son
- The Boy
- The Child
- Madame Pace
- The Manager/Director
- Leading Lady
- Leading Man
- Second Lady
- L'ingénue
- Juvenile Lead
- Other Actors and Actresses
- Property Man
- Prompter
- Machinist
- Manager's Secretary
- Door-Keeper
- Scene-Shifters

== Synopsis ==
Performance by the Pirandello Theatre of Art, Rome, given in London in 1925: the Manager/Director with the family

An acting company prepares to rehearse the play The Rules of the Game by Luigi Pirandello. As the rehearsal is about to begin, they are unexpectedly interrupted by the arrival of six strange people. The Director of the play, furious at the interruption, demands an explanation. The Father explains that they are unfinished characters in search of an author to finish their story. The Director initially believes them to be mad, but as they begin to argue among themselves and reveal details of their story, he begins to listen. The Father and The Mother had one child together (The Son), but they have separated and Mother has had three children by another man – The Stepdaughter, The Boy and The Child (a girl). The Father attempted to buy sex from The Stepdaughter, claiming he did not recognize her after so many years, but The Stepdaughter is convinced he knew who she was the entire time. The Mother walked in on The Father and The Stepdaughter shortly after The Father's proposal and informs The Stepdaughter that he is her ex-husband; they both express their disgust and outrage. While The Director is not an author, he agrees to stage their story despite disbelief among the jeering actors.

After a 20-minute break, The Characters and The Company return to the stage to perform some of the story so far. They begin to perform the scene between The Stepdaughter and The Father in Madame Pace's shop, which the Director decides to call Scene I. The Characters are very particular about the setting, wanting everything to be as realistic as possible. The Director asks The Actors to observe the scene because he intends for them to perform it later. This sparks the first argument between The Director and The Characters over the acting of the play because The Characters had assumed that they would be performing it, seeing as they are The Characters already. The Director continues the play, but The Stepdaughter has more problems with the accuracy of the setting, saying she doesn't recognize the scene. Just as The Director is about to begin the scene once more, he realizes that Madame Pace is not with them. The Actors watch in disbelief as The Father lures her to the stage by hanging their coats and hats on racks, and Madame Pace follows, "attracted by the very articles of her trade".

The Manager, The Stepdaughter and The Father, played by Egisto Olivieri, Marta Abba and Lamberto Picasso, 1925

The scene begins between Madame Pace and The Stepdaughter, with Madame Pace exhorting The Stepdaughter, telling her she must work as a prostitute to save The Mother's job. The Mother protests at having to watch the scene, but she is restrained. After The Father and The Stepdaughter act half of the scene, The Director stops them so that The Actors may perform what they have just done. The Characters break into laughter as The Actors try to imitate them. The Actors continue but The Stepdaughter cannot contain her laughter as The Actors use the wrong tones of voice and gestures. The Father begins another argument with The Director over the realism of The Actors compared to The Characters themselves. The Director allows The Characters to perform the rest of the scene and decides to have the rehearsals later.

This time, The Stepdaughter explains the rest of the scene during an argument with The Director over the truth on stage. The scene culminates in an embrace between The Father and The Stepdaughter, which is realistically interrupted by the distressed Mother. The line between reality and acting is blurred as the scene closes with The Director pleased with the first act.

The final act of the play begins in the garden. It is revealed that there was much arguing among the family members as The Father sent for The Mother, The Stepdaughter, The Child, The Boy, and The Son to come back and stay with him. The Son reveals that he hates the family for sending him away and does not consider The Stepdaughter or the others a part of his family. The scene ends with The Child drowning in a fountain, The Boy committing suicide with a revolver, and The Stepdaughter running out of the theater, leaving The Son, The Mother, and The Father on stage. The play ends with The Director confused over whether it was real or not, concluding that in either case he lost a whole day over it.

== Productions ==
=== Première ===
The play was staged in 1921 by the Compagnia di Dario Niccodemi at the Valle Theatre in Rome to mixed results. The public split into supporters and adversaries. The author, who was present at the presentation with his daughter Lietta, was forced to leave the theatre through a side exit in order to avoid the crowd of opponents. However, the play was a great success when presented in Milan.

=== West End production, 1922 ===
The first production in English was given at the Kingsway Theatre, London on 26 February 1922, directed by Theodore Komisarjevsky, with the following cast:

- The Father – Franklin Dyall
- The Mother – Lilian Moubrey
- The Stepdaughter – Muriel Pratt
- The Son – William Armstrong
- The Boy – Frederick Peisley
- The Little Girl – Sylvia Spagnoletti
- Madame Pace – Margaret Yarde
- The Manager and Leading Comedian – Alfred Clark
- The Leading Man – George Hayes
- The Leading Lady – Sylvia Young
- The Juvenile Man – Maurice Colbourne
- The Juvenile Lady – Elizabeth Arkell
- The Heavy Lady – Muriel Hope
- The Third Actor – Hugh Owen
- The Fourth Actor – D. A. Clarke-Smith
- The Stage Manager – Matthew Forsyth
- The Prompter – J. Leslie Frith
- The Stage Doorkeeper – Gilbert Davis

=== Broadway and off-Broadway productions ===
- American premiere: 30 October 1922, 136 performances, Princess Theatre, directed by Brock Pemberton
- 26 February 1924, 17 performances, 44th Street Theatre, directed by Brock Pemberton
- 15 April 1931, 13 performances, Bijou Theatre, staged by William W. Schorr
- 11 December 1955, 65 performances, Phoenix Theatre, adapted by Tyrone Guthrie and Michael Wager based on a translation by Frank Tauritz, staged by Tyrone Guthrie
- 8 March 1963, 529 performances, Martinique Theatre, directed by William Ball, received Outer Critics Circle Award and three Obie Awards

=== Other ===
- 1926: Gregan McMahon produced the play, performed by the Sydney Repertory Company, at the Conservatorium in Sydney, Australia.
- 1931: Tyrone Guthrie directed the play at the Westminster Theatre in London
- 1948: Ngaio Marsh directed the play with the Canterbury Student Players at the Little Theatre, Christchurch, New Zealand, as a special performance for The Old Vic touring company featuring Laurence Olivier and Vivien Leigh.
- 1949: Ngaio Marsh directed the play on a 140 performance tour for 25,000 people with the Canterbury Student Players to Sydney, Canberra and Melbourne, Australia.
- 1996: Robert Brustein adapted the play for the American Repertory Theater in Cambridge, Massachusetts
- 2000: Cesear's Forum, Cleveland's minimalist theatre company, presented the play in the intimate Kennedy's Theatre at Playhouse Square in a July/August production.
- 2000: Part of the Shaw Festival season (Niagara-on-the-Lake) at the Court House Theatre, directed by Tadeusz Bradecki and translated by Domenico Pietropaolo. Revived in 2001.
- 2008: A production in the Minerva Theatre, Chichester, adapted by Ben Power and Rupert Goold and directed by Goold, transferred to the Gielgud Theatre, London, for a limited run
- 2011: Produced by the Hong Kong Academy for Performing Arts at Hong Kong, adapted and directed by Wingo Lee
- 2012: Produced by The Hypocrites at the Chopin Theatre in Chicago; adapted by Steve Moulds and directed by Artistic Director Halena Kays
- 2013, 2–14 April: Produced by WOH Productions at the Rose Theatre, Bankside in London; adapted by Anthony Khaseria and Manuela Ruggiero, directed by Manuela Ruggiero
- 2014: Adapted in Urdu language, produced by National Academy of Performing Arts, Karachi (Pakistan)
- 2014: Adapted by the Sydney University Dramatic Society featuring student actors playing themselves
- 2014: A production by Théâtre de la Ville-Paris, translated and adopted in French by François Regnault, and directed by Emmanuel Demarcy-Mota, toured the United States
- 2016: Adapted by New England Youth Theater in Brattleboro Vermont, adapted and directed by Rebecca Waxman, with students cross-cast with characters and actors exchanging parts in alternating performances
- 2022: Adapted by Crane Creations Theatre Company in Canada in a play date event. This play reading is meant to spread awareness and increase appreciation of playwrights and playwriting from around the world and to global audiences.
- 2026: Produced by Ad Astra Theatre Company at the Galaxy Theatre in Brisbane, Australia, directed by Heidi Gledhill.

== Translations into English ==
- Edward Storer (E. P. Dutton & Co., 1922)
- Frederick May (1954)
- Eric Bentley (1964)
- Paul Avila Mayer (1967)
- John Linstrum (1979)
- Felicity Firth (1988)
- Mark Musa (Penguin, 1996)
- Anthony Mortimer (Oxford, 2014)
- Penelope Bussolino (Broadway Play Publishing Inc, 2025)

== Adaptations ==
- 1946: BBC Home Service radio – translated by H. K. Ayliff; Monday 30 September 1946. With Raymond Lovell (the producer), Ernest Milton (the father), Rachel Gurney (the daughter).
- 1954: BBC Television – translated by Frederick May; Tuesday 20 April 1954. With Mary Morris (the step-daughter), Ralph Michael (the father), Yolande Healy (the leading lady), Ralph Nossek (the leading man). Produced by Royston Morley. The cast was drawn from the company of the Library Theatre, Manchester, and accordingly the setting of the play was relocated there.
- 1959: BBC Home Service, World Theatre radio – translated by Frederick May; Monday 27 July 1959. With Noel Johnson (the producer), Donald Wolfit (the father), Lydia Sherwood (the leading lady), Gabriel Woolf (the son). Produced and adapted by H. B. Fortuin.
- 1959: an opera by Hugo Weisgall, libretto adapted from Pirandello by Denis Johnston
- 1963: An Australian film adaptation directed by Christopher Muir
- 1973: Danmarks Radio's public television adaptation, Seks roller søger en forfatter
- 1976: A PBS television adaptation directed by Stacy Keach, and starring Andy Griffith, John Houseman, and Stacy's brother James Keach; available on DVD
- 1986 BBC World Service and BBC Radio 4 21 Sep 1986: A radio adaptation with Charles Gray, Yvonne Bryceland, Emrys James, and Cherie Lunghi.
- 1992: A BBC film adaptation directed by Bill Bryden
- 2012: Director-choreographer David Gordon's The Beginning of the End of the..., a dance-theatre piece based on Six Characters as well as other works by Pirandello, performed at the Joyce Soho for the month of June.
- 2013: Six Characters in Search of a Stage A chamber opera composed by Edward Lambert
- 2022: Film set in Thailand by Dhewakul, M. L. Pundhevanop (15 September 2022)

== In popular culture ==
- "Six Charlies in Search of an Author" (1956), episode of The Goon Show
- "Five Characters in Search of an Exit" (1961), an episode of The Twilight Zone (1959 TV series), references the play in its title and existentialist themes
- Eight Characters in Search of a Sitcom (2003) – starring Ed Asner, James L. Brooks, Georgia Engel, Valerie Harper and Gavin MacLeod, written and directed by Matthew Asner and Matthew Gold
- Dead White Writer on the Floor (2011) by Drew Hayden Taylor, a play borrowing from the Theatre of the Absurd featuring a cast of characters inside a writer's head
- Six Characters in Search of an Outlet (2016), a widely circulated cartoon in The New Yorker by illustrator Liam Francis Walsh
- "12 Characters in Search of an Apocalypse: On the Road" (2017) – essay by American author Andrew Boyd that was turned into a travelling conversation / performance
- The 2020 BBC comedy series Staged features David Tennant and Michael Sheen attempting to rehearse the play via internet video conferencing during a period of COVID-19 lockdown. The 2021 third series sees Simon trying to get Michael and David to agree to a Christmas staged version of Six Characters in Search of an Author, and later A Christmas Carol, before becoming a metafictional behind the scenes documentary of the show entitled BackStaged.
- The 2022 Italian movie La Stranezza, directed by Roberto Andò, tells how Pirandello, played by Toni Servillo, was inspired to create the play following the meeting with a group of amateur performers led by actors Onofrio Principato and Sebastiano Vella, played by comedy duo Ficarra e Picone

== See also ==
- A Sensation Novel – another play of the same genre from the 1870s by W. S. Gilbert
- At Swim-Two-Birds – novel by Flann O'Brien
- Stranger than Fiction – film starring Will Ferrell with similar themes
