= Publixtheatre Caravan =

Publixtheatre Caravan logo

The Publixtheatre Caravan is the English name for a travelling project of the Volxtheater Favoriten, a Vienna-based international theatrical troupe that has been creating site-specific theatrical interventions in public space as well as stage-based performances since 1994. It is a political and artistic project that is part of the No Border Network and the Platform for a World Without Racism. It creates critical performance theatre that targets racism, borders, migration control, biometric data collection, and other forms of social control.

Since May 2001, the Publixtheatre Caravan has been creating international travelling informational, media, and artistic campaigns, to squat reality by directly interposing theater and artistic installations into everyday life.

The Volxtheater Favoriten is based out of the Ernst Kirchweger Haus (EKH), the former headquarters of the Austrian Communist Party in Vienna, a legalised squat that hosts migrants and refugees, community activities, and political groups. The Volxtheater has no permanent cast. There are no directors; the plays are developed communally during long discussions, with great disparity of views.

== Projects ==
The first production was a version of Bertolt Brecht's "The Threepenny Opera" (autumn 1994 and September 1995), followed by the Greek play "Penthesilea" (March 1996), "We can't pay? We won't pay" (June-November 1996, "Chor der Werkstätigen und Nichtwerkstätigen" (Choir of the Working and the Not Working) (Winter 1996), "EKHberet" (January 1997) "Theatercollagen" (Theatre Collages) (March 28 and 29 1997), "Der Auftrag" (The Commission) (May/June and October 1997) and "Schluss mit Lustig" (No More Joking) (December 1999). "Schluss mit Lustig" was developed in reaction to the rise to power of Austria's extreme right-wing Freedom Party, and premiered in the Vienna Schauspielhaus.

Since November 2002, the Caravan has been producing full-length video and musical performance play based on the book, "Bukaka Spat Here," by Alexander Brener and Barbara Schurz.

In addition to full-length plays, the Volxtheater sees itself as an actionist group provoking political responsibility and moral courage by artistically intervening - spontaneously or planned - in public space, via street theatre and "guerrilla fun".

A few of the street theatre actions of the Volxtheater include: crossing the Danube channel (spring 1995), army parade (October 26, 1995), matamorphile hexaphonium (spring 1996), demonstration against the government's cuts on social payment (April 1996), street theatre during trials against people who signed an appeal to refuse to obey orders in the army (fete of Bewegung Rotes Wien in June 1996) Krems: performance of the play "We can't pay? We won't pay!" on the street (July 1996), "Auf zur großen Grenzschutzaktion" (Let's Go for the Big Frontier Protection Action) (April 26, 1997). "Spendenaufruf für die europäische Sicherheit" (Call for Charity for European Safety) on the army parade (October 26, 1999).

In summer 2000 the idea emerged to form a caravan to advance the political actionism of the Publix Theatre. As a part of the "cultural caravan through Carinthia and Styria", that held cultural events in villages and small towns in Carinthia and Styria and international resistance days in Klagenfurt, the caravan moved through Austria. The aim was to combine theatrical actions and information campaigns to enact change. The caravan left monuments with the inscription "no border no nation - for an open carinthia, for an open Europe" in its wake. The Publixtheatre caravans of 2001, 2002 and 2003 took this idea to an international level. Creating public theatrical interventions while dressed as UNO soldiers, police, border guards, and biometric researchers, the Publixtheatre has always provoked confusion as to whether they represent fiction or reality.

== Genoa Group of Eight Summit protest ==
After its participation in protests during the G8 summit in Genoa, 2001, the caravan was arrested in Italy. The 25 activists, journalists, and hitchhikers who were arrested there were kept in the custody of local police and then spent the next 3–4 weeks in the Voghera and Alessandria prisons in Italy before being deported and banned from re-entry. They were accused of being members of a "criminal organisation" that Italian authorities gave the name of the "black bloc" whose imputed goal was said to be "devastation and looting". They were charged with property destruction, looting, and criminal association. The police evidence against them included their possession of black clothing, knives used to create a mobile street kitchen, as well as juggling clubs, poi, and other props.

== See also ==
- Anti-globalization
- Culture jamming
- Guerrilla communication
- Spaßguerilla
