= Guerrilla communication =

Communication technique

Guerrilla communication and communication guerrilla refer to an attempt to provoke subversive effects through interventions in the process of communication. It can be distinguished from other classes of political action because it is not based on the critique of the dominant discourses but in the interpretation of the signs in a different way. Its main goal is to make a critical non-questioning of the existing, for reasons ranging from political activism to marketing. In terms of marketing, journalist Warren Berger explains unconventional guerrilla-style advertising as "something that lurks all around, hits us where we live, and invariably takes us by surprise". These premises apply to the entire spectrum of guerrilla communication because each tactic intends to disrupt cognitive schemas and thought processing.

The term was created in 1997 by Luther Blissett and Sonja Brünzels, with the publication of Kommunication Guerrilla Handbook (originally in German, translated in 2001 to Spanish and Italian). Both pertain to autonome a.f.r.i.k.a gruppe, which includes many people involved in communication guerrillas such as activists and non-artists living in different German peripheries. However, it was used before in 1984 by Jay Conrad Levinson, as a marketing strategy for small businesses.

== Forms ==
One form of guerrilla communication is the creation of a ritual via participative public spectacle to disrupt or protest a public event or to shift the perspectives of passers-by. Such spectacles often take the form of street and guerrilla theater. Another way to create such spectacle is via tactical frivolity. Pie-throwing as performance art is a form of guerrilla communication. Other forms of guerrilla communication include adbusting, graffiti, hacktivism (notably cybersquatting), and reclaiming.

An example of guerrilla communication are the demonstrations taking place since 15 May 2011 in Spain and cities in other countries, such as London, Berlin or Paris. These demonstrations, organized through the Internet, are trying to create awareness among the population about other ways to manage governments, using the motto "Real Democracy NOW!"

== Main methods of action ==
Generally, the techniques and methods used are guided by two principles: distanciation and over-identification.

Distanciation is based on subtle modifications in the regular representation, which lights new aspects of the representation and produces by displacement, new meanings unforecast. It consists on taking images, ideas and forms to change the communication process or its usual presentation to create confusion and reconsideration about each own cultural grammar. The new elements in the communication process create perturbations, which are effective to offer a critic vision to general public in front of the traditional point of view. The goal of this method is to create distance in front the existing to gain a new perspective. For example, in the mid-1990s the ad agency Crispin Porter + Bogusky employed distanciation in order to raise support for a local homeless shelter. Their method included printing posters on dumpsters that said "kitchen" and a "House" poster was placed on bus shelters. Creative director Bogusky had the notion that the homeless "live in separate culture, where things take on new meanings- a bench becomes your bed; a shopping cart becomes your closet". In this case, distinction confronts the passers-by to re-consider the traditional concept of "home" and how this seemingly basic concept is not applicable to homeless people.

On the other hand, over-identification means to publicly express those aspects which are well known but still taboo, or consciously disregarded. An effective way of subversion may consist in expressing positively the hidden aspects of the communication in a convincing way, better if it is close to the system dominant logic. This is a call to the background parts of the message not always seen but felt. Another example of over-identification exists in the work of street artist Banksy. In October 2003 he entered the landscape room at the Tate Britain, removed a framed painting from his bag, and glued it to the wall. Beside the work, a rural scene with an image of police tape stenciled over it, the artist placed a card reading: "Banksy 1975. Crimewatch UK Has Ruined The Countryside For All Of Us. 2003. Oil On Canvas." As mentioned prior, this installation ensures that the "felt message" is also the "seen message". It is a reaction to a culturally dominating institution, Crimewatch UK. It was accomplished in a guerrilla-esque, under-the-radar manner, and it also amplifies a consensus of sentiments towards such institutions.

== See also ==
- 2007 Boston bomb scare, corporate guerrilla communication gone awry
- Culture jamming
- Situationist prank
- Subvertising

Practitioners of guerrilla communication

- The KLF / K Foundation
- Lavender Menace
- Andreas Heusser
- monochrom
- Publixtheatre Caravan
- Reclaim the Streets
- Spaßguerilla
- Women's International Terrorist Conspiracy from Hell (W.I.T.C.H.)
- Youth International Party
