= Guerrilla theatre =

Form of guerrilla communication

Guerrilla theatre, generally rendered guerrilla theater in the US, is a form of guerrilla communication originated in 1965 by the San Francisco Mime Troupe, who, in spirit of Che Guevara's writings from which the term guerrilla is taken, engaged in performances in public places committed to "revolutionary sociopolitical change". The group performances, aimed against the Vietnam War and capitalism, sometimes contained nudity, profanity and taboo subjects that were shocking to some members of the audiences of the time.

Guerrilla (Spanish for 'little war'), as applied to theatrical events, describes the act of spontaneous, surprise performances in unlikely public spaces to an unsuspecting audience. Typically these performances intend to draw attention to a political/social issue through satire, protest, and carnivalesque techniques. Many of these performances were a direct result of the radical social movements of the late 1960s through mid-1970s. Guerrilla theatre, also referred to as guerrilla performance, has been sometimes related to the agitprop theatre of the 1930s, but it is differentiated from agitprop by the inclusion of Dada performance tactics.

== Origins ==
The term guerrilla theatre was coined by Peter Berg, who in 1965 suggested it to R.G. Davis as the title of his essay on the actions of the San Francisco Mime Troupe, an essay that was first published in 1966. The term "guerrilla" was inspired by a passage in a 1961 Che Guevara essay, which read:

The guerrilla fighter needs full help from the people.... From the very beginning he has the intention of destroying an unjust order and therefore an intention... to replace the old with something new.

Davis had studied mime and modern dance in the 1950s and had discovered commedia dell'arte. In autumn 1966 around 20 members of the San Francisco Mime Troupe broke off and started their own collective called the Diggers, who took their name from a group of 17th century radicals in England.

== Guerrilla theatre in practice ==
Guerrilla theatre shares its origins with many forms of political protest and street theatre including agitprop (agitation-propaganda), carnival, parades, pageants, political protest, performance art, happenings, and, most notably, the Dada movement and guerrilla art. Although this movement is widely studied in Theater History classrooms, the amount of research and documentation of guerrilla theater is surprisingly lacking. The term "guerrilla theatre" seems to have emerged during the mid-1960s primarily as an upshot of activist radical theatre groups such as The Living Theatre, San Francisco Mime Troupe, Bread and Puppet Theater, El Teatro Campesino, and the Free Southern Theater. It also has important roots in Allan Kaprow's "happenings".

The first widely documented guerrilla performances were carried out under the leadership of Abbie Hoffman and the Youth International Party (Yippies). One of their most publicized events occurred on August 24, 1967, at the New York Stock Exchange where Hoffman and other Yippies threw dollar bills onto the trading floor below. Creating a media frenzy, the event was publicized internationally. In his later publication, Soon to be a Major Motion Picture (1980), Hoffman refers to his television appearances with specially planned subversive tactics as "guerrilla theatre."

Guerrilla theatre was used as a protest demonstration by the anti-war organization Vietnam Veterans Against the War. An article from the summer of 1971 published in the glossy magazine Ramparts detailed one such performance in Washington, D.C.:

A squad of soldiers moved through the part adjoining the U.S. Capitol. They were grubby looking troopers, clad in jungle fatigues and "boonie hats" with wide brims turned up. Jumping a low fence, they began shouting at a group of tourists. 'All right. Hold it. Hold it. Nobody move. Nobody move.' Their voices were full of tension and anger. A man broke out of the crowd and started running. Several soldiers fired at once, and the man fell, clutching his stomach. Blood could be seen on the clean sidewalk. The tourists turned away in horror. 'Get a body count,' a soldier yelled.

Another squad of soldiers emerged from under the Capitol steps. 'All right. ID. ID,' they screeched. 'You got no ID and you VC.' They quickly grabbed a young woman and led her away, binding her wrists behind her back and prodding her with their rifles.... They grabbed [a] young man and threw him on the ground, tying his hands behind his back. Several of the soldiers kicked him, seeming to aim for his groin.

Then someone took out a long, thick hunting knife and lifted up the man's shirt, holding the knife to his bare stomach, and pushed against it slightly. 'You VC? You VC?' The man said nothing. He was pushed to his feet and shoved down again. Then he was told to get up. This time the knife was pushed to the side of his neck, and the same question was repeated. Still no answer. The man was dragged away.... Then the soldiers left, and a smaller, less angry group of men dressed in khaki fatigues passed out leaflets to the astonished tourists.

"A US Infantry platoon just passed through here!" the pink colored piece of paper read in big bold letters. "If you had been Vietnamese... We might have burned your house. We might have shot your dog. We might have shot you... HELP US END THE WAR BEFORE THEY TURN YOUR SON INTO A BUTCHER OR A CORPSE."

== Post-1970s performance theatre ==
Another guerrilla performance group that continued the use of the term was the Guerrilla Girls. This group of feminist artist-activists was established in New York City in 1985 with the purpose of bringing attention to the lack of female artists in major art galleries and museums. The Guerrilla Girls began their work through guerrilla art tactics which broadened to include guerrilla theatre. Some common practices in their guerrilla theatre techniques that have been replicated by other groups include appearing in costume, using assumed names, and disguising their identity.

== Guerrilla theatre groups ==
The origins and legacy of guerrilla theatre can be seen in the work of these political/performance groups:

- ACT UP
- Billionaires for Bush
- Billionaires for Wealthcare
- Bread and Puppet Theater
- The Church of Euthanasia
- Circus Amok
- Clandestine Insurgent Rebel Clown Army
- El Teatro Campesino
- Free Southern Theater
- Reclaim the Streets
- Reverend Billy and the Church of Stop Shopping
- San Francisco Mime Troupe
- Situationism
- Vietnam Veterans Against the War
- Youth International Party (Yippies)
- FEMEN
