= Spaßguerilla =

Part of the 1960s German student protest movement

The Spaßguerilla or Spaßgerilja (lit. 'fun guerrilla') was a grouping within the student protest movement of the 1960s in Germany that agitated for social change, in particular for a more libertarian, less authoritarian, and less materialistic society, using tactics characterized by disrespectful humour and provocative and disruptive actions of a minimally violent nature. Events organized by the groups included actions such as attacking politicians or the police with custard pies.

One of the main proponents was Fritz Teufel, sometimes referred to as the political clown of the Extra-parliamentary Opposition (Außerparlamentarische Opposition). The lack of respect for traditional, "bourgeois," "repressive" forms of authority and ritual, countered by irony and humour, was typified by Fritz Teufel's reply when told to stand for the judge at a trial: "If it helps the search for the truth" (Wenn's der Wahrheitsfindung dient).

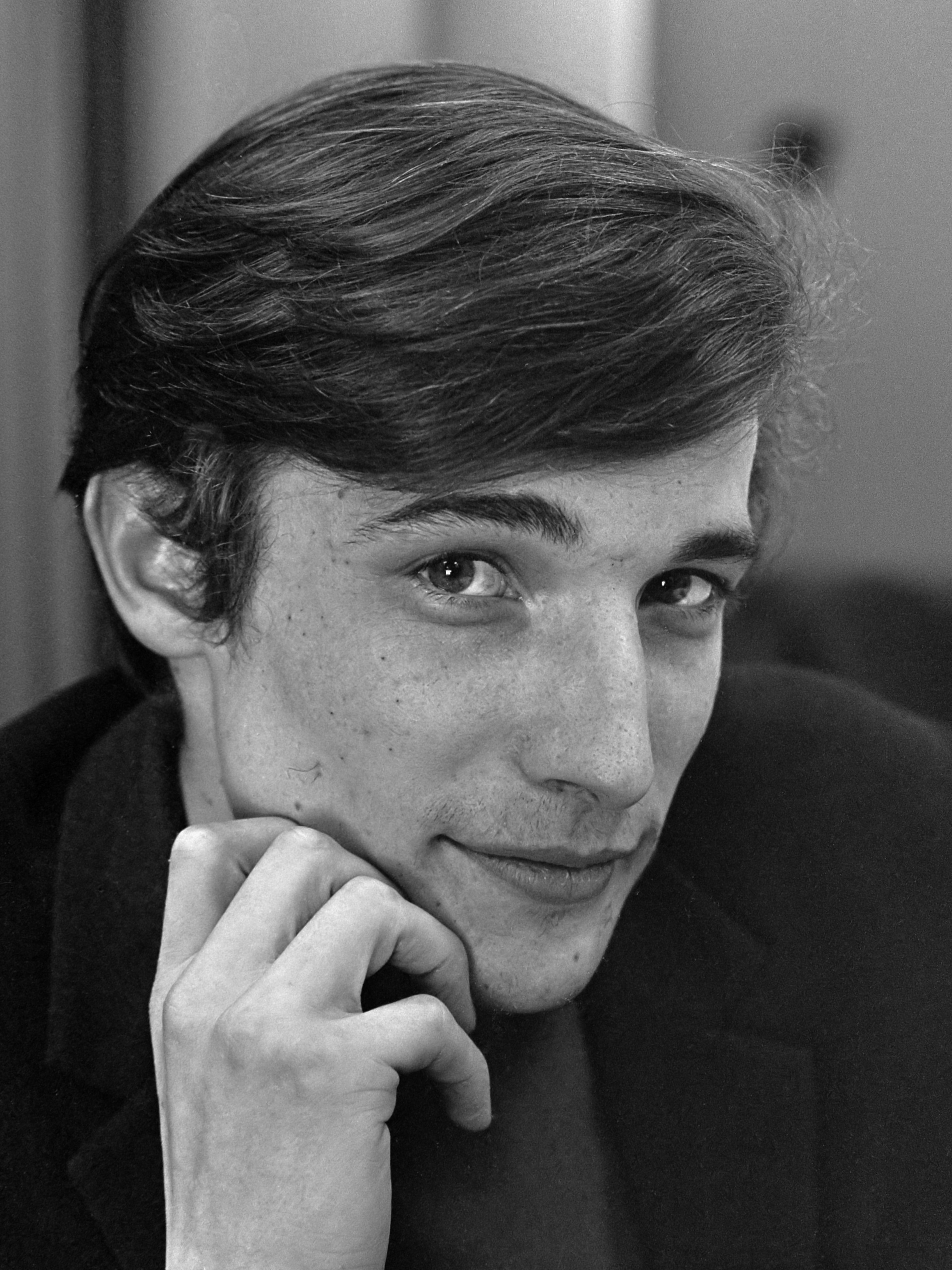
Wolfgang Lefèvre (1968)

The tactics of the Spaßguerilla were characterized by civil disobedience, symbolic (rather than real) violence, provocation of authority, using actions of the "authoritarian" state, such as trials, as opportunities for "unmasking" outdated traditions. These tactics and attitudes were in contrast to the more serious, revolutionary rhetoric and actions of other groups centred on the SDS and figures like Rudi Dutschke. While Dutschke spoke of a "Stadtguerilla" (urban guerrilla), Teufel spoke of a "Spaßguerilla" (fun guerrilla).

It was Wolfgang Lefèvre who said that every event or demonstration should be planned so as to be fun for the participants.

The forms of provocative and disruptive protest invented by the Spaßguerilla were later adopted by the peace movement of the 1980s and later by youth protest movements in the reunified Germany. Similar forms of disruption have also been adopted by hacktivists.

== Spelling ==
Fritz Teufel used the word "Spaßgerilja". Though the normal German spelling is Spaßguerilla, Teufel's spelling became known as the "teuflische Schreibweise" (a pun meaning either "Teufelian" spelling or "diabolical spelling"; Teufel in German means devil). This spelling is retained by some, including academics (see references).

== See also ==
- Kommune 1
- Biotic Baking Brigade
- Clandestine Insurgent Rebel Clown Army
- German Apples Front
- Guerrilla communication
- Gemüseschlacht
- New Left
- Situationism
