= Billionaires for Wealthcare =

External image
- The Coat of Arms of the Billionaires for Wealthcare (The Caduceus is designed to resemble the US dollar symbol, the green to further represent money or wealth and the shield as a reference to Blue Cross and Blue Shield.)

Billionaires for Wealthcare were a political guerrilla theatre and culture jamming group that was satirically opposed to U.S. President Barack Obama's attempts at healthcare reform in the United States. Their stated satirical goals were meant to expose the moneyed interests in keeping the status quo of healthcare at the time.

== Modus operandi ==
Much like the earlier Billionaires for Bush, its members arrived at events (both pro- and anti-reform) in phony limousines wearing fancy attire (tuxedos, top hats, evening gowns, pearls etc.) and addressed one another by pseudonyms such as "Phil T. Rich", "Z. Roe Compassion" and "Frida Market". They carried signs with slogans such as Let Them Eat Advil, Do Not Harm Our Bottom Line and If We Ain't Broke, Don't Fix It! (the latter also being the group's official motto). Their chants included: Walk. It. Off., Wealthcare, Not Healthcare! and Your Pain, Our Gain. Their repertoire also included songs with satirically modified lyrics set to well known tunes such as The Battle Hymn of the Republic and We Shall Overcome.

They were always friendly and polite to reform opponents, making sure to thank them profusely for fighting to protect their supposed fortunes. Likewise they adopted a polite but faux taunting posture towards pro reform advocates. Often these tactics created confusion, with reform opponents returning their friendly gestures and supporters responding angrily back.

== History ==
At the time, there had been some remnants of the older Billionaires for Bush (B4B) members around the country that were beginning to push back against the Tea Party. The "Billionaires for Wealthcare" name was created and first used by a small group in Phoenix, AZ. Their first action was on August 22, 2009, at a Tea Party Protest at Representative Harry Mitchell's office. They created the website and owned the domain. Local activist/videographer, Dennis Gilman, recorded the Billionaires encounter with the Tea Party protesters and produced a video that garnered much media attention.

Another group in North Carolina, led by Chase Foster, also began similar actions in the same timeframe.

After the media attention from the Arizona action, the Phoenix group decided to hand over the domain to the original Billionaires for Bush activists in New York. They were more capable in managing the website and expanding the movement in the same ways they had with B4B. They united the groups in AZ, NC and other cities under the B4W banner.

== Activities, growth and media coverage ==
They had chapters in 20 states and the District of Columbia. The BFW have been featured or mentioned in numerous media outlets, both mainstream and underground. On October 23, 2009, at the final day of the Washington DC conference of America's Health Insurance Plans, an insurance industry advocacy group, BFW members interrupted a speech by Republican pollster Bill McInturff, with a version of the song Tomorrow from the musical Annie, featuring lyrics modified to mock those opposed to the public option , ,. This happened to include most everyone attending the conference. The BFW members continued to sing as they were escorted out by security.
