= Loldiers of Odin =

Finnish activist group

Loldiers of Odin are a Finnish activist group who dress as clowns, parodying the anti-immigration Soldiers of Odin. The group first appeared on the streets in Tampere in January 2016, dancing and singing alongside a silent march by the Soldiers of Odin.

== Issues ==
In January 2016, two members were arrested for disrupting a torchlit "Close the Borders" anti-immigration parade. Two of the members have been convicted of petty crime: they have been sentenced to fines for committing nonviolent crimes such as disobedience against police, squats and an unlawful threat against a politician.

== See also ==
- Clandestine Insurgent Rebel Clown Army
