= 12 Characters in Search of an Apocalypse: On the Road =

Performance

- Written by: Andrew Boyd
- Original language: English
- Genre: Climate Emergency

Premiere
- Date premiered: October 13, 2017
- Place premiered: Portsmouth, UK

12 Characters in Search of an Apocalypse: On the Road is a travelling interactive performance of the collection of essays entitled 12 Characters in Search of an Apocalypse by USA author Andrew Boyd published in 2017. The essays have been described as a "Vagina Monologues for the apocalypse". A UK group working with Wales-based Community Interest Company Giraffe Social Enterprises began a travelling roadshow that used the Characters as a focus for encouraging communities to discuss how they are being affected by the climate emergency and called the roadshow 12 Characters in Search of an Apocalypse: On the Road.

== Essay ==
The essay 12 Characters in Search of an Apocalypse was written by American author Andrew Boyd and published April 2017 in issue 11 of The Dark Mountain Project. The title is a reference to the absurdist play Six Characters in Search of an Author by Luigi Pirandello. The 12 independent sections of the essay are each told from viewpoint of a very different person, living in the USA – "as diverse as America itself." Andrew has described these as Characters, Sketches, or A slice of inner life.

Boyd performed some of the Characters at the launch party for Dark Mountain Issue 11 held at Wild Goose Space in Bristol on 12 May 2017.

The essays are part of the larger project I Want a Better Catastrophe due out in early 2020.

As of December 2019, the essay has been translated into German, Arabic, Romanian, French, and Spanish.

== Roadshow ==
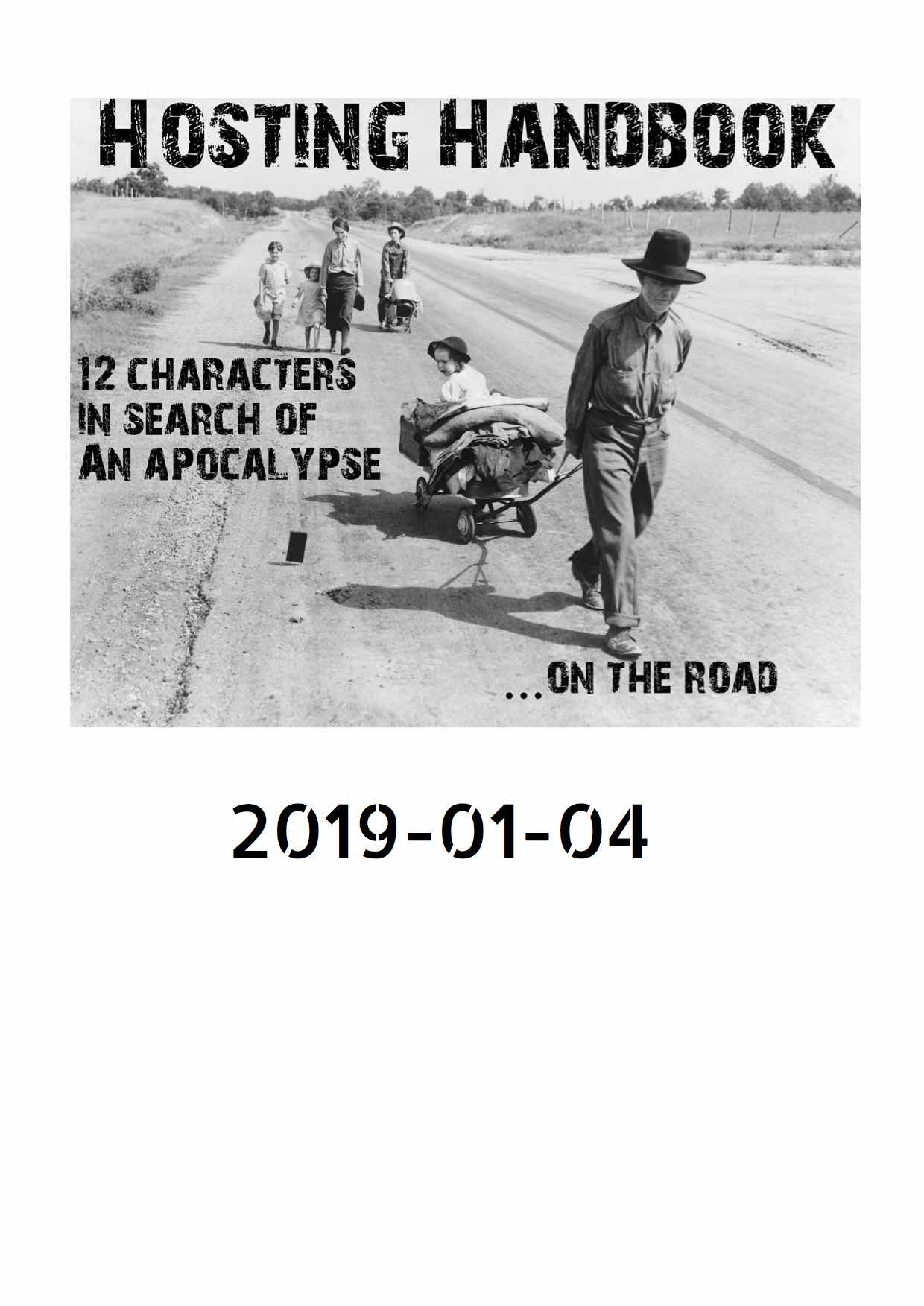
Cover of the Hosting Handbook, the book distributed for event hosts

In August 2017, a group from Giraffe Social Enterprises, a community interest company in Wales, began a travelling performance of the monologues to encourage community-wide conversations about the challenge of climate change. 12 Characters in Search of an Apocalypse ...On the Road has been performed venues as diverse as private homes, festivals, cafes, hacker conventions, intentional communities, and Quaker centers.

Because of significant amount of audience participation each gathering is distinct, depending on the combination of organizers, participants, and place. The first publicly advertised gathering happened in a private home on Kent Road in Portsmouth.

An organizer of On the Road describes the events as gatherings rather than performances or plays: "We've called them 'Gatherings' because we haven't found a more descriptive label that fits. They are half performances (we read the monologues and people listen for 45 minutes) and half conversations (in between every 3rd monologue there are interludes for neighbors to share with one another and after the readings are finished there is 90 minutes for an open hosted conversation). Currently my focus is learning how to assist people to share candidly and listen vulnerably during the conversation."

=== Performances ===
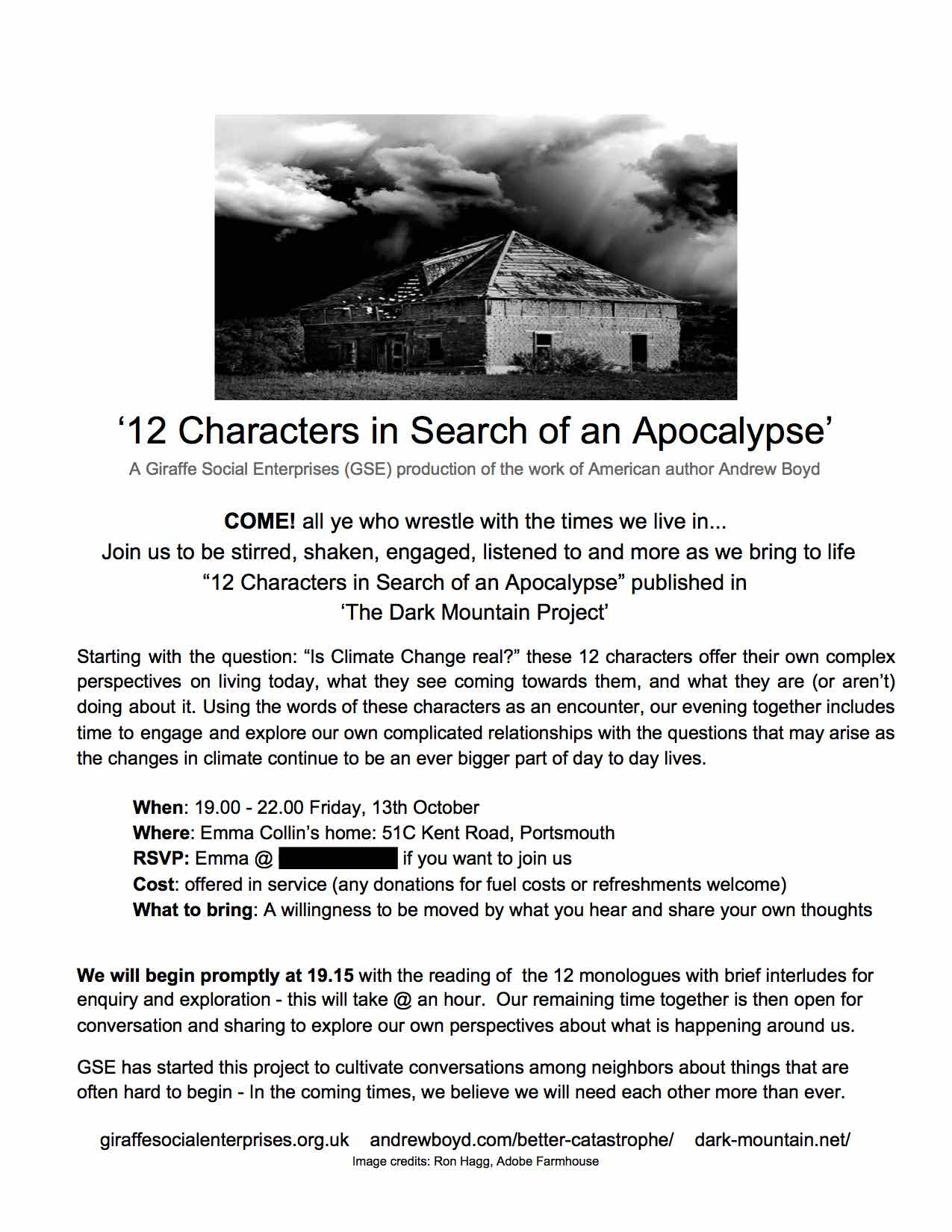
Initial event flyer for first public Portsmouth performance

The first trial performance happened in Norfolk in August 2017 and the first public performance happened on 13 October 2017, in Portsmouth. There have been 20+ gatherings in Wales, England, and Scotland to date with most events taking place in private homes, some in cafes and at schools Ysgol Dewi Sant, in Wales. Since the translation of the Characters was added to the Open Source Transifex translation site, the event began to spread internationally. And as of January 2020 there have been gatherings hosted in the US, Germany, Spain, Romania, Austria, and Australia.

== Activism ==
In May 2018, activists from the eXtinction Rebellion participated at a gathering in Bristol and were inspired by the performances. They began to use 12 Characters in Search of an Apocalypse alongside their normal information talks as a way of inspiring people to be concerned about the dire state of human culture's current trajectory. The 23 October 2018 gathering in Glastonbury is the only known gathering hosted by eXtinction Rebellion team.

== Follow-up book ==
Boyd is writing a book called I Want a Better Catastrophe: 69 Paradoxes for Surviving the 21st Century, which will include the 12 Characters essay and is intended to be published early 2020.

== Characters ==
Andrew Boyd refers to the individual sections of the essay as Characters or perspectives or slices of inner life. Each is a unique, narrow viewpoint of how a particular individual alive in 2017 experiences climate change. The original 12 characters published in Dark Mountain issue 11 are all extremely USA-centric and they all believe climate change is real and that it is a critical problem. Only the Character If it gets too bad, God will intervene released as one of the seven additional Characters doesn't believe that climate change is a serious problem.

=== Original Characters ===
The original Characters included in the Dark Mountain publication were:

- I did the math – a stock analyst in New York City learns about climate change after Hurricane Sandy. He begins wrestling with the three big numbers from Bill McKibben's Rolling Stone article Global Warming's Terrifying New Math – "I’ve got a head for numbers, and numbers for me are realities you base decisions on. But those numbers hurt my head. They hurt my everything."
- Let's party like it's 2099 – a seemingly self-absorbed but harshly observant Character – "Don’t get me wrong: I’m not happy about all this. But the way I see it, there’s nothing I can do, and we’re the last generation that gets to let it rip full throttle."
- I am prepared – one of the extremely USA-centric Characters, a bunker building Prepper – "My family and I are going to survive this, even if we’re the last ones on Earth."
- It's gonna happen – but to somebody else – one of the beautifully complex Characters who on one hand clearly observe what is happening and how severe it is but on the other hand sees themselves as somehow magically being able to get away while the world is going to Hell – "Do I think justice is at work here? Hardly. It’s pretty much the opposite of justice. I’m just telling you how it looks from where I stand. When I imagine the climate apocalypse, when I play out the nightmare scenarios, I’m never in them."
- What will the future think of me? – a family man has an existential attack of guilt over his inaction towards the climate - "Will my as-yet-unborn grandkids and grandnephews come visit me? Maybe. Though not with blue ribbons, I suppose. What will the future say about me? He lived a full life, he was a good father, but he was asleep at the switch when we needed him most."
- The apocalypse is my gravy train – engineer / boss of a high-profile construction company wants people to realize that big problems need big solutions - "No offense, but it won’t be about the folks in New Orleans’ Third Ward this time. We’re looking at Manhattan, Miami's Gold Coast and Boston's Financial District, for starters. Now that's some property there. I'm guessing the government is going to come up with the cash needed to do the job right this time, and our firm is well positioned to help."
- Bring it on! – a character helping to bring on the collapse of industrial civilization, suggested by some authors such as Derrick Jensen as inevitable and necessary - "When Nature finds its own rhythms again, we can, too. The only way forward is backwards. The only way forward is collapse."
- Better to be hopeful – a character that is torn by both how fucked up the world is and how beautiful the world is decides to focus on hope - "I won’t reassure you that everything is going to be OK. It most certainly won’t be. I’m not over-bubbling with enthusiasm and cheerfulness, I’m just quietly, soberly hopeful."
- Defend this ground – a septuagenarian from Michigan does what is possible to fight against the developers - "What keeps me going is this patch of ground, this sacred bit of Earth. Lake Superior, that God, is the heart and lungs of the continent. The Devil is the mining companies and the real estate developers. I don’t have a lot of strength left, but I’m still putting up a fight where I can."
- Despair is our only hope – a character that testifies to the cost of fighting to stay hopeful and the dark power of despair - "I used to believe the revolution was just around the corner, that before I turned thirty, we’d be celebrating in the streets. Well, that didn’t happen."
- This means war – a character that realizes, slowly over time that we are at war - "If it had been an army of Orcs led by the Eye of Sauron, or gangly robots from Mars, or jackbooted Nazis and their henchmen marching into town, then I would have known. I would have seen it plainly. I would have taken up arms, joined the Resistance. But our 21st Century Lords of Carbon, in their suits and pipelines and feel-good logos, blend in better."
- Hopelessness can save the world – "Martin Luther King said, ‘The arc of the moral universe is long but it bends toward justice.’ But from where we stand now, it's more accurate to say, ‘The arc of the moral universe might be long, and it might bend towards justice, but we’re never gonna find out because: total ecosystem collapse.’"

=== Additional Characters ===
Andrew Boyd published a further 7 Characters on his website in 2018:

- I refuse to go extinct - This is one of the only Characters taken from an actual speech - by Swedish environmental activist Greta Thunberg on 31 October 2018 delivered during the reading of the declaration of the eXtinction Rebellion outside the British Parliament)
- We can get through this together - regardless of the ultimate consequences of the climate collapse, there's a lot of work to do and we're better off doing it together - "I say: Enough with the isolation and despair. Enough with feeling overwhelmed. Enough with expecting someone else to take care of it. We need to push through all that, and get busy."
- I want a better catastrophe - this Character explores the hard choices that lie ahead if we turn to face them - "If projections tell us 50% of the Earth’s species are likely to die off, and we can do something to help make that 'only' 49%, shouldn’t we try? Indeed. We must protect all that we can."
- I have kids, hopelessness is simply not an option - becoming a parent changes this character's view on the significance of climate change. "Now, I have to believe that there’s a way to brake the train or miraculously switch tracks, or for some to jump clear before the end. I have to have hope. The alternative is a death sentence for my children."
- If it gets too bad, God will intervene - a fundamentalist Christian view - "Likewise, I trust the scientific instruments that have been recording the rise in temperature over the last 30 years. But the Earth and everything in the Universe is God’s Creation. Unless it is His will, God will never let it come to ruin."
- Science will find a way - "Science got us into this mess, and science will get us out, even if that means putting huge solar reflectors in space, or seeding the atmosphere with sulphur aerosols or turning half the Pacific into a carbon sequestration sink."
- We can fix this - "With the possible exception of Exxon’s lobbyists, we’re all on the same team: Team Earth. Failure is simply not an option."
