= Andrew Boyd (fencer) =

American fencer

Personal information
- Born: January 30, 1910 New York, New York, United States
- Died: January 10, 2002 (aged 91) Bishop, California, United States

Sport
- Sport: Fencing

Andrew Boyd (30 January 1910 – 10 January 2002) was an American fencer. He competed in the team épée events at the 1936 and 1948 Summer Olympics.
