= Andrew Boyd (author) =

American author

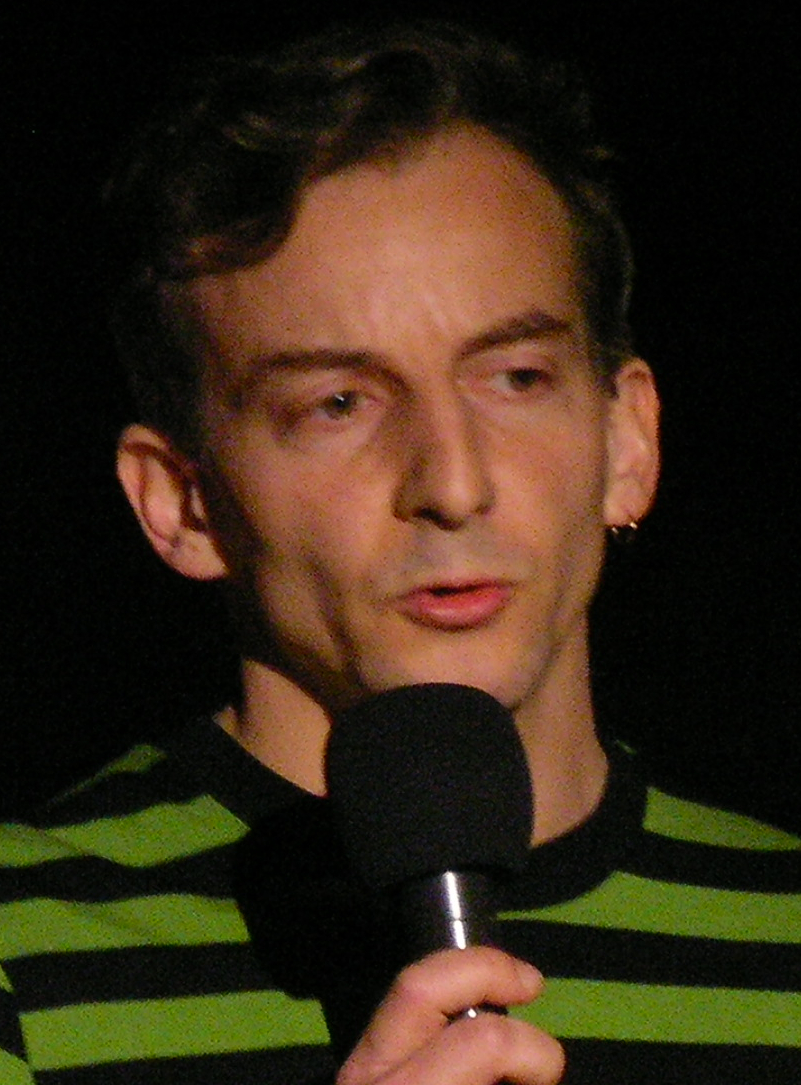
- Andrew Boyd speaking publicly
- Born: 1962 (age 62–63); New York City, U.S.
- Education: University of Michigan
- Occupation(s): Writer and activist
- Known for: Books, pranks
- Notable work: Beautiful Trouble, Daily Afflictions, I Want a Better Catastrophe

Andrew Boyd (born 1962) is an American author, humorist, and veteran of creative campaigns for social change. He led the decade-long satirical media campaign Billionaires for Bush. He co-founded Agit-Pop Communications, a "subvertising" agency, as well as the netroots social justice movement, The Other 98%. He's the author of five books: I Want a Better Catastrophe, Beautiful Trouble, Daily Afflictions, Life’s Little Deconstruction Book and the Activist Cookbook.

== Biography ==
Andrew grew up in Manhattan while his father taught at New York University. He attended University of Michigan and became radicalized around the global peace movement at 19. During a year off from university, he travelled to California where he attended his first nonviolence training in preparation for a big civil disobedience protest at the Lawrence Livermore nuclear weapons facility. This event began a lifelong passion for peace and justice.

A pioneer of viral activism, Andrew was one of the driving forces behind Billionaires for Bush and the Million Billionaire March including events that pranked donors at elite fundraising events. He founded, and for several years directed, the arts and action program at United for a Fair Economy. He has taught "creative activism" at New York University. His writing has appeared in The Nation, The Village Voice and several anthologies on social movements.

His first book, The Activist Cookbook: Creative Actions for a Fair Economy (United for a Fair Economy, 1997), is a hands-on manual that showcases media stunts, street theater skits, and creative direct actions from the labor and social justice movements.

His second book, Life's Little Deconstruction Book: Self-Help for the Post-Hip (W. W. Norton & Company, 1998), provides an introduction to theoretical posturing, a commentary on postmodernism, a subversive satire, and a tribute to the love-hate relationship some have with fashionable ideas.

His third book, Daily Afflictions: The Agony of Being Connected to Everything in the Universe, published in 2002 by W. W. Norton & Company, is a dark, twisted, existential manifesto posing as a book of daily inspiration.

His fourth book, Beautiful Trouble: A Toolbox for Revolution (OR Books, 2012), is an activist resource. It assembles the ideas of 10 organizations and over 70 individuals into a set of interlocking design principles. The complete work is a database of stories, tactics, principles, theories and methodologies. In 2018, Andrew was co-editor of the follow-up toolkit, Beautiful Rising: Creative Resistance from the Global South (OR Books, 2018). The contents of both have been made available for free as part of the online learning platform Beautiful Trouble.

His most recent work I Want a Better Catastrophe: Navigating the Climate Crisis with Grief, Hope, and Gallows Humor was published in 2023. An excerpt of this was published in Dark Mount Issue 11 titled "12 Characters in Search of an Apocalypse". The collection of 12 short essays was turned into a travelling performance about climate change, 12 Characters in Search of an Apocalypse: On the Road, that started in the UK and has spread to numerous other countries.

== Books ==
=== As author ===
- I Want a Better Catastrophe: Navigating the Climate Crisis with Grief, Hope, and Gallows Humor (2023, New Society Publishers) ISBN 9780865719835
- Daily Afflictions: The Agony of Being Connected to Everything in the Universe (2002, W. W. Norton & Company) ISBN 978-0-393-32281-1
- Life's Little Deconstruction Book: Self-Help for the Post-Hip (1998, W. W. Norton & Company) ISBN 0393318702}
- The Activist Cookbook: Creative Actions for a Fair Economy (1997, United for a Fair Economy) ISBN 0965924904

=== As editor ===
- Beautiful Trouble: A Toolbox for Revolution (2012, OR Books) ISBN 1935928570
- Beautiful Rising: Creative Resistance from the Global South (2018, OR Books) ISBN 1944869816

== Essays ==
- 12 Characters in Search of an Apocalypse - published in issue 11 of The Dark Mountain Project ISBN 9780995540217
