= German Apples Front =

German Apples Front Front Deutscher Äpfel
- Abbreviation: F.D.Ä.
- Founder: Alf Thum
- Founded: 2004, Leipzig, Germany
- Ideology: Satirical anti-fascist

Party flag

Website
- https://www.apfelfront.de/

The German Apples Front (German: Front Deutscher Äpfel, FDA), also called the Apple Front (German: Apfelfront) is a satirical organisation, founded in Leipzig in 2004. It satirizes right extremist parties, especially the Nationaldemokratische Partei Deutschlands (NPD). In the style of former and existing right extremist organisational structures it is subdivided into numerous sub-groups like the youth organisation Nationales Frischobst Deutschland (NFD; National Fresh Fruit of Germany), the women's organisation Bund weicher Birnen (B.W.B.; League of Soft Pears, compare League of German Girls; Birne, pear, is a German colloquial term for head, "eine weiche Birne haben" ("to have a soft pear"), is synonymous to "being very stupid"), and many further local Gaue (a term used by the Nazi Party).

== Platform ==
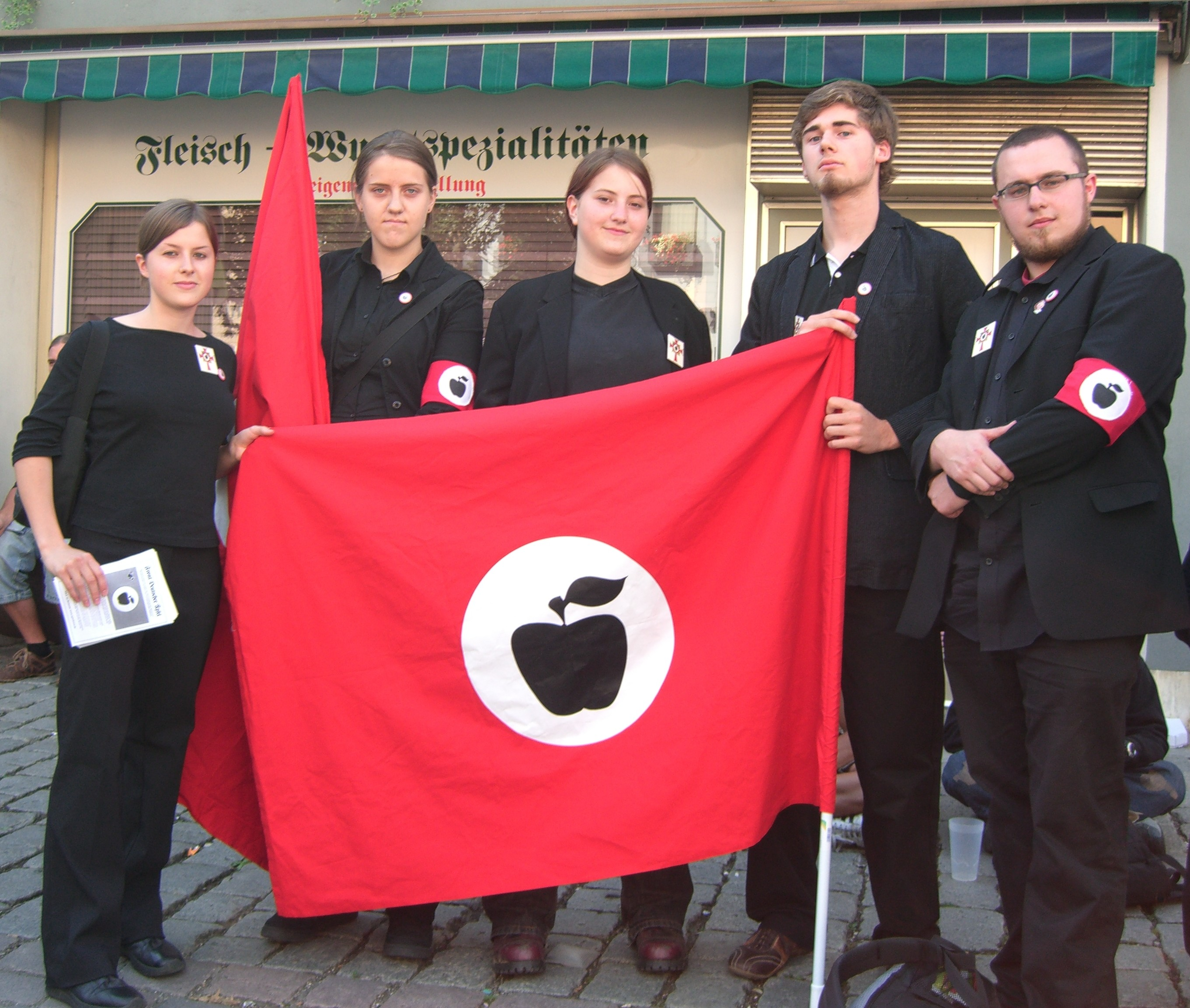
Apple Front activists in typical uniform with satirized right extremist symbols and bearing: compare with

The Apple Front argues in favour of political requirements for purification of the German fruit crop. The organisation describes itself as "Nationale Initiative gegen die Überfremdung des deutschen Obstbestandes und gegen faul herumlungerndes Fallobst" - translated "National initiative against the overforeignization of German fruit crop and against lazy/rotten mooching fallen fruit" (faul means both lazy and rotten).

The key demands of the organisation are:

1. Termination of the overforeignisation of German fruit by engrafting of foreign species.
2. Closing the borders against tropical fruits ("Grenzen dicht für Fremdobst!" - English "Close the borders against foreign fruit!").
3. Elimination of lazy/rotten (compare faul above) windfall ("Macht Fallobst zu Mus!" - English "Make windfall to mush!").

The Apfelfront tries to use overly Germanized terminology in press releases and statements, at public demonstrations and on their website just like original right and extreme right internet services, and mimics the public appearance of the NSDAP and modern right extremist organisations. Therefore "homepage" is called "Heimseite", "webpage" is named "Weltnetzseite"' and "bulletin board/forum" is turned into "Brett" (all three English terms are common in current German usage; the translated/transformed German terms are commonly perceived as xenophobic or at least ridiculous in context of information technology).

Particular terms, slogans and rhetorical devices used by the NPD and especially by Holger Apfel, their chairperson in the Landtag of Saxony, such as "Grenzen dicht!" ("Close the borders!") are picked up by the Apple Front and get used overly explicitly but are changed in their political message to orcharding and fruit utilization in order to make the original political statements and their representatives appear ridiculous.

== History and activities ==
The Front Deutscher Äpfel was founded shortly after the Saxon election of 19 September 2004. The group, and Alf Thum, its founder, considers itself not as leftist but as non-right. They consider themselves to be artists who are trying to break away from the demonstration-counterdemonstration ritual.

The Front's youth organisation (most German political parties have active youth organisations) is called "Nationales Frischobst Deutschlands" ("National Fresh Fruit of Germany"). The "Bund weicher Birnen" ("League of Soft Pears/Heads") is affiliated with them in their national struggle.

Since its founding, the Apfelfront has attended all larger NPD and neo-nazi marches/parades, especially in Eastern Germany. They have also got involved with Berlin 05 Youth Politics Festival, sponsored by the German federal government.

== See also ==
- Culture jamming
- Discordianism
- Guerrilla marketing
- Spaßguerilla

== Sources ==
- Sven Näbrich: Verbunden mit der deutschen Rundfrucht Sächsische Zeitung, 12 June 2005 – cited in: Aktion Zivilcourage Pirna: Die Rundfrucht-Patrioten www.nadeshda.org
