= Clandestine Insurgent Rebel Clown Army =

British left-wing activist group (2003–05)

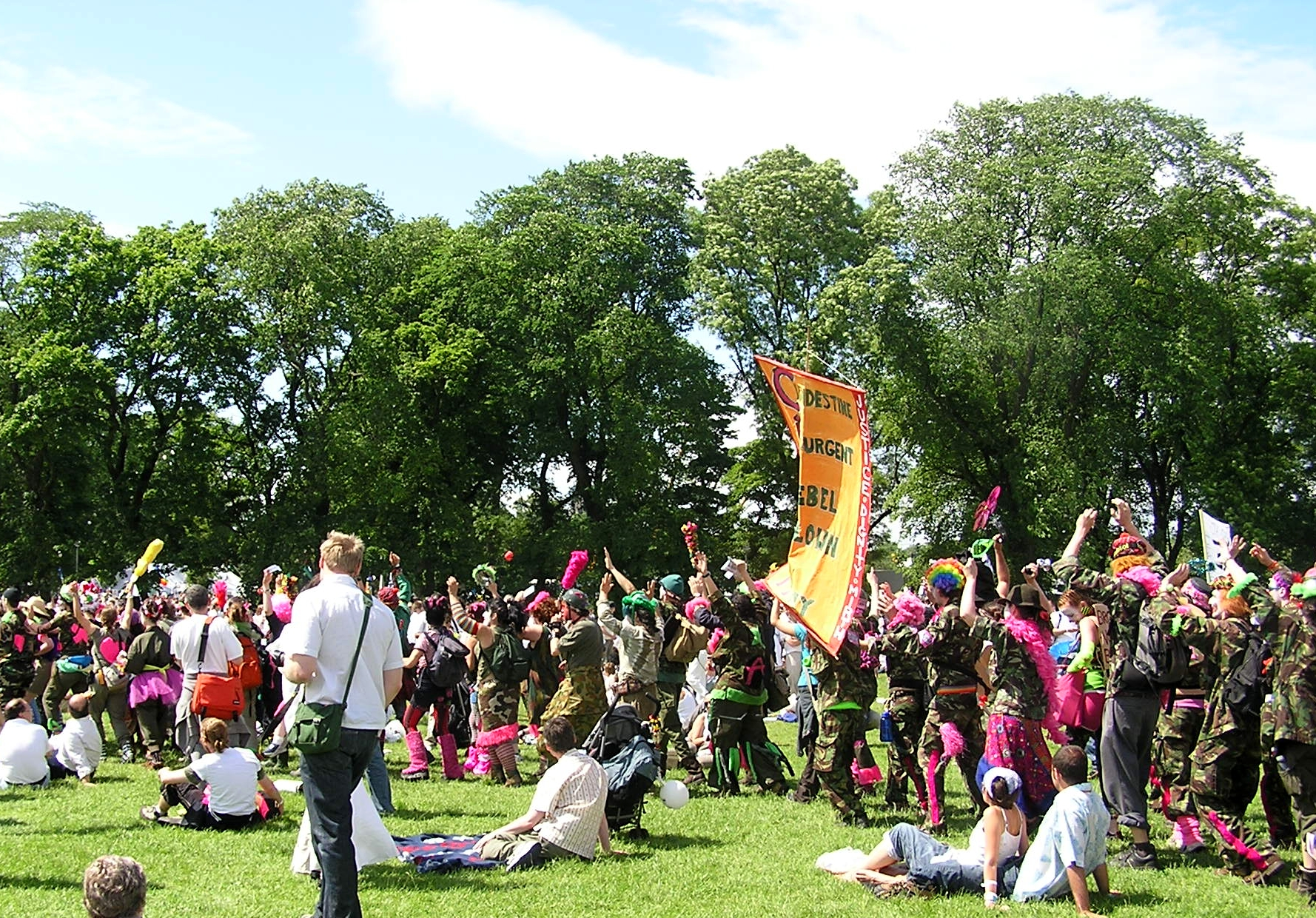
CIRCA at the 2005 Make Poverty History March

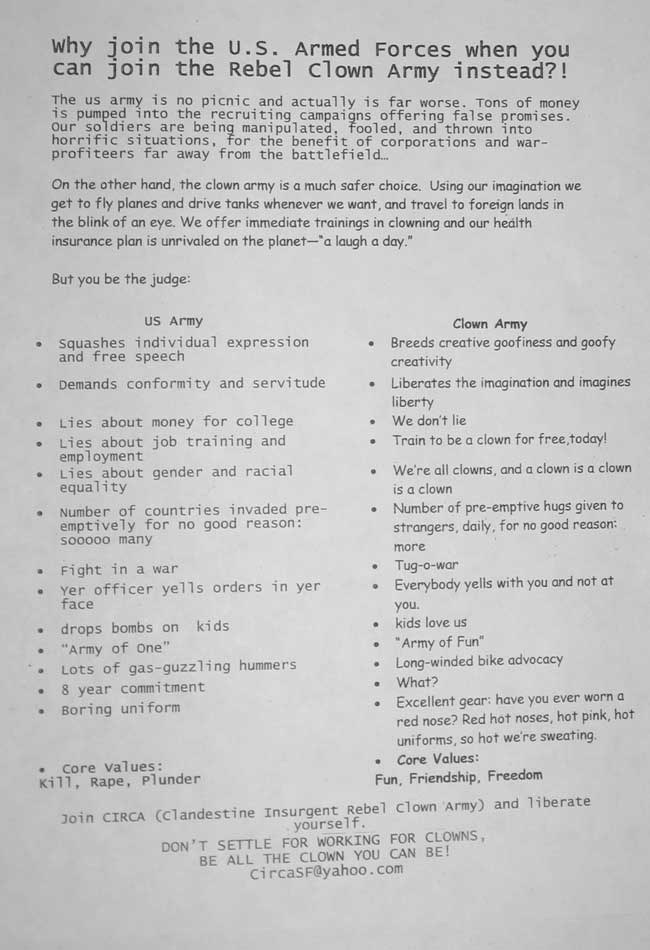
CIRCA recruitment poster, with side by side comparison with U.S. Army incentives, standards, and values.

The Clandestine Insurgent Rebel Clown Army (also known as CIRCA and Clown Army) was an anti-authoritarian left-wing activist group primarily active from 2003 to 2005 in the United Kingdom. The Clown Army used clowning and non-violent tactics to act against corporate globalisation, war, capitalism, and heavy policing of protests, among other issues.

== Activity ==
=== Origin ===
CIRCA emerged from the direct action movement in London in November 2003 in response to U.S. President George W. Bush's visit to the United Kingdom.

The Clown Army was founded by Lawrence M. Bogad (Colonel Oftruth), Jay [formerly John] Jordan (Kolonel Klepto), Hilary Ramsden (General Confusion), Theo Price, Matthew Trevelyan, Jennifer Version, and Zoe Young (Private Individual).

=== George Bush protest ===
CIRCA's protest against George W. Bush's 2003 visit to the United Kingdom was announced under the premise that the clown army would storm Buckingham Palace in a protest against the Queen inviting the 'wrong sort of fool' back in.

The Clown Army paraded through the streets of London in a militant formation, following satirical orders of "Right-sneer!" and "Left-spit!". They marched behind the guards at the Tower of London and launched pink pretzels (in reference to Bush previously choking on a pretzel) at corporate buildings from a cardboard circus cannon. In the park across from Buckingham Palace, the clowns dropped to the ground and army-crawled towards the palace in a pantomime of sneaking, pretending to take cover behind singular fallen leaves they held up. Upon arrival at the Palace, the Clown Army delivered a manifesto denouncing Bush, cheered and celebrated, then disbanded.

=== Occupation of Leeds ===
In response to the United Kingdom's incomplete withdrawal from Iraq in June 2004, CIRCA occupied Leeds under what they labelled the Clown Provisional Authority in their Anti-Official Communique #3, “Re: the so-called handover of Iraq, June 2004”.

The Clown Army occupied the Leeds BBC HQ, the Labour Party offices, the Menwith Hill spy base, and the local armed forces recruitment centre, causing a scene and refusing to leave. After the recruitment centre was forced to close early due to CIRCA's disruption, the clowns set up their own Clown Army recruitment centre outside.

=== G8 Protest Recruitment Tour ===
Prior to the 31st G8 Summit in Scotland, CIRCA travelled to London, Bristol, Manchester, Birmingham,Cork- Eire,Sheffield, Aberdeen, Edinburgh, Newcastle, and Glasgow in a caravan pulled by a biodiesel-fueled van, courtesy of the Laboratory of Insurrectionary Imagination.

In each city, CIRCA would put on a performance involving puppetry, origami, performance art, and video presentations that would spread their message and raise consciousness about the issues that the Clown Army was fighting against. They would also hand out organic chips to their audience, and explain that the leftover fat from the chip fryer would fuel their van to get them to the next city.

After their performance, CIRCA would lead two day Big Shoe Camps for any locals who may be interested in enlisting in the Clown Army.

=== G8 protests ===
About 150 clowns acting for the Clandestine Insurgent Rebel Clown Army showed up to the protests against the G8 summit in July 2005. Each day of the protests, a clown council made up of about 15 affinity groups, called 'gaggles', would be held to determine courses of action for the day.

==== Make Poverty History March/Operation Brown-Nose ====
On 1 July 2005, the day before the Make Poverty History march in Edinburgh, CIRCA held a press conference in Bristo Square and released the communique #8.86, “Re: Operation BROWN-NOSE”. The press conference demonstrated CIRCA's protest techniques such as marching and call-and-response, and explained their approach to the protests against G8. Operation Brown Nose responded to the promised presence of Labour Party leaders Gordon Brown and Hillary Benn at the Make Poverty History March. The operation would involve patrolling and protecting the march and otherwise participating in the demonstration as usual.

During the Make Poverty History march on 2 July 2005, CIRCA marched alongside other protestors and played games, performed slapstick routines, and improvised. When a group of black bloc protestors were surrounded by police, the Clown Army encircled the police until the protestors were released.

==== Faslane nuclear submarine base blockade/Operation Mass Distraction ====
CIRCA participated in a blockade of the Faslane nuclear submarine base organized by the Campaign for Nuclear Disarmament on 4 July 2005. The Clown Army labelled their deployment in the blockade as Operation Mass Distraction, in reference to the war on Iraq being framed as a war against a terrorist state with weapons of mass destruction, and distracting from the countries of the G8 protecting their own nuclear weapons.

==== Carnival for Full Enjoyment ====
CIRCA facilitated and participated in the Carnival for Full Enjoyment in Edinburgh on 4 July 2005. This city-wide event called for workers to cast aside corporate concerns for the day and enjoy life without the pressures of capitalism. Filling the streets with festivities, the Carnival disrupted daily corporate proceedings and aimed to provide a free space for imagination to run wild. Carnival-goers played games, danced to samba bands, and celebrated.

Since the Carnival was anti-authority in nature, no permits were requested for the event. Viewing the event as a possible threat, a police force of approximately 10,000 was called in response.

Many confrontations occurred between police and protestors, ranging from benign to playful to even violent, in one instance where dancing clowns were baton-charged by police. In another, more frivolous, instance, clowns atop a bridge convince the police to play a game of ‘Dwarfs, Wizards, and Giants’ (a variant on rock paper scissors involving teams and full body movements) with them. When both the clowns and the police chose to be wizards, they, as per the rules, called it a draw and hugged.

The Carnival for Full Enjoyment was largely inspired by the 18 June 1999 Carnival Against Capital that occurred in response to the 25th G8 Summit in Cologne, Germany.

==== Operation HA.HA.HAA ====
CIRCA's Operation HA.HA.HAA (Helping Authorities House Arrest Half-witted Authoritarian Androids) took place on 6 July 2005, the first date of the 31st G8 Summit, during the mass protest organized by G8 Alternatives outside of the Gleneagles Hotel where the summit was being held.

The operation was intended to invert the expectations of how protestors would act. It was based on the premise that the police guarding the summit were not keeping protestors out, but rather keeping the ‘dangerous’ members of the G8 inside. Rather than try to scale the fences and break in to disrupt the meeting, rebel clowns helped build fences higher and ‘guard’ where the members of the G8 were ‘being detained’. The clowns also created mobile road blocks to disrupt travels to the G8 meeting.

=== Decline ===
After the protests at the G8 summit, CIRCA fell into a period of inactivity and eventual dissolution. CIRCA's website domain (www.clownarmy.org) became defunct and was put up for sale in 2015.

== Structure and organization ==
The Clandestine Insurgent Rebel Clown Army was a non-hierarchical, horizontalist organization. It had no real leaders and operates as a collective of smaller locale-based affinity groups, known in the Clown Army as ‘gaggles’. Each gaggle consisted of roughly ten to fifteen clowns, identified by monikers such as Glasgow Kiss, Group Sex, or Backward Intelligence. The clowns themselves were known as 'clownbattants', 'rebel clowns', or simply clowns, fools, buffoons, or any number of synonyms. Individual rebel clown names typically parody military ranks, such as General Confusion, Major Disaster, or Private Parts.

Any decisions that affect the larger group were made through consensus via clown council. In a clown council, all gaggles of clowns sat in a circle and elected a spokesperson, and the spokes council discusses the matter. The gaggles then discussed amongst themselves before returning to the larger group to communicate their decision. Once the council reached a consensus on one issue, they would move on to the next. Sometimes this consensus would simply take the form of each gaggle doing what they wanted to do.

Leadership responsibilities were distributed based on circumstances and were limited to temporarily organizing specific actions. Most actions of CIRCA, however, require no leaders and are determined by collectivity, spontaneity, and emergent intelligence.

This non-hierarchical approach made surveillance and control of the Clown Army by authorities more difficult and served as a prefiguration for the autonomist future that the Clown Army was working towards. Since no clown had any more authority than another, members could not be coerced into doing something they did not want to do, and each member was equally responsible for keeping the army alive through participation and commitment.

== Big Shoe Camp ==
New members of CIRCA were required to take part in a minimum two-day training known as "Big Shoe Camp", in a parody of military boot camps. In these trainings, members learned marches and maneuvering, as well as building skills for working together without leaders. The training also helps new recruits to develop their clown persona, including creating a clown name, makeup look, physicality, and costume. CIRCA uses games and exercises in the training to practice being a clown, working together, and improvising under pressure, many of which are adapted from theatre improvisation games and Boal's Theatre of the Oppressed.

=== Name switch ===
This game involves walking around a room, pointing at objects, and alternating between calling them the correct name and calling them what they are not. This is intended to encourage spontaneity and break normal patterns of thinking.

=== Hug tag ===
This game is identical to the classic game of tag, except that the players must hug another player in order to not be tagged. This is intended to familiarize recruits with physicality and touch, as well as the importance of helping others and not running away when in danger.

=== Yes, Let's All... ===
This exercise involves one participant suggesting an action in the “Let's all..” format and demonstrating the action, which the other participants repeat and mimicking until a new participant suggests a new action. This is intended to practice taking and surrendering leadership, as well as acting together as a group.

=== Pass the Red Nose ===
This exercise is a modified version of the classic hot potato game, in which the players pass a red clown nose while singing a song. When they stop, whoever is holding the nose must put it on and stand in front of the group while being watched and complimented. This is intended to make recruits more comfortable with attention, as well as to build confidence.

== Appearance ==
The costumes of members of CIRCA were created and customized by each member, but they shared common characteristics- a multiform rather than a uniform. The costumes and clown personae helped create a barrier between the members of CIRCA and the emotional or verbal abuse that they may endure. Insults were thrown at the clown, not the person underneath.

All clowns wore face paint and makeup. The designs were unique and personalized, but they typically reflected the white-faced clown style, complete with red noses. The makeup added to the comical atmosphere the Clown Army brings to protests while also protecting the anonymity of members, offering the clown a sense of separation from expected social etiquette, and fostering a sense of unity across the clown army.

Second-hand military fatigues were cut up, decorated, and trimmed with pink and green faux fur, the signature colors of the Clown Army. They wore helmets made from steel colanders and were armed with items like water pistols and feather dusters.

Clownbattant's pockets were stuffed to the brim with absurd things such as strings of sausages, rubber ducks, flower petals, and sex toys. In cases of searches by police or arrests, the pockets would be emptied, and the items documented and itemized.

== Tactics, beliefs, and goals ==
CIRCA helped popularize the form of protest known as rebel clowning, which combines clowning performance art and activism. It is an offshoot of tactical frivolity and is inspired by Bakhtin’s Rabelaisian carnival, Boal’s Theatre of the Oppressed, bouffon, and historical fools. CIRCA's beliefs, as demonstrated by their actions and press releases, most closely align with post-anarchist ideology, with an emphasis on anti-authoritarianism and anti-capitalism.

We are clandestine because we refuse the spectacle of celebrity, and without real names, faces or noses, we show that our words, dreams, and desires are more important than our biographies. We are insurgent because we have risen up from nowhere and are everywhere, and because an insurrection of the imagination is irresistible. We are rebels because we love life and happiness more than 'revolution,' and because while no revolution is ever complete, rebellions continue forever. We are clowns because inside everyone is a lawless clown trying to escape, and because nothing undermines authority like holding it up to ridicule. We are an army because we live on a planet in permanent war– a war of money against life, of profit against dignity, of progress against the future. We are an army because a war that gorges itself on death and blood and shits money and toxins, deserves an obscene body of deviant soldiers. We are circa because we are approximate and ambivalent, neither here nor there, but in the most powerful of all places, the place in-between order and chaos.

— Clandestine Insurgent Rebel Clown Army, defunct CIRCA website (www.clownarmy.org)

CIRCA utilized 'clown logic', a form of associative logic which plays upon perceived stupidity, using improvisation, spontaneity, and humour. Clown logic assumes all of those around them are friends, including police trying to control them at protests.

As part of the Clown Army's satirical performance of military, the clownbattants often march in pseudo-military formation (then break out into clown chaos at any moment) and perform the CIRCA Clown Salute, which involves using one's right hand to thumb their nose, wiggling their fingers, and grinning.

The rebel clowns also perform a maneuver they call fishing, after the movement of a school of fish. This movement involves a tightly clustered group all moving in one direction at the same pace, sometimes making the same sound and gesture, then seemingly simultaneously changing direction, with a different clown heading the group each time they rotate. This brings a collectivity to the Clown Army and makes their movements more unpredictable.

=== Bringing joy back to social justice ===
At protests, clowns could often be seen playing games with other protestors and even police. The clownbattants seemed perpetually happy and energetic, and this can inspire others, who may have been turned off from the solemnity and outrage associated with protests, to participate in social justice.

A key part of the process of becoming a clownbattant was reconnecting with one's emotions and learning how to be vulnerable and open to new experiences. This approach can help avoid activist burn-out and serve as emotional rejuvenation while still staying active in social justice causes. It also helps members develop a sense of clown logic.

=== Creating a carnivalesque free space ===
CIRCA engaged in prefigurative politics, not only through its non-hierarchical structure, but also through its work to produce spaces in which there is no authoritative leader or social rules. CIRCA aims to show with their actions that the kind of world they are working towards is possible.

=== Subverting expectations ===
One of the key goals of the Clown Army was to subvert the expected behaviors and concept of protestors, to activists, authorities, and the media alike.

They did not respond to police officers with confrontation; rather, they aim to confuse them. The rebel clowns aren't scared of the police officers, instead treating them as ‘friends’. The clowns will deliberately misunderstand orders given by police or ask why the line they are asked to stay behind is so important. This fearlessness and refusal to acknowledge the power dynamic of police and protestors is meant to take power away from the authorities. It also can disarm the police, as they are trained to deal with angry protestors, not giggling clowns. They fraternize with the police, playing games and collaboratively building on their orders to establish a human connection and break stereotyping.

The methods of CIRCA disrupted the media narrative of protesters as angry and dangerous. One of the most famous images to come out of CIRCA's actions is a rebel clown known as Trixie smearing a lipstick-covered kiss on the riot shield of a police officer during the Carnival for Full Enjoyment. This image and other CIRCA images and descriptions juxtaposed with news articles denouncing and dehumanizing protestors are intended to cause readers to re-evaluate their beliefs about activists.

=== Drawing attention ===
CIRCA drew in media attention through their absurd appearance and actions, which stand out from the typical protestors with signs. This attention allows them to speak through the media to spread their messages to a larger audience. Their method of clowning and active engagement with audiences is also intended to make the public more receptive to their ideas.

=== Protecting protestors ===
Since an integral part of the Clown Army's operations is humour, one of the duties it assumed is diffusing tense situations, which could cause a non-violent protest to escalate through protestors’ frustration or police brutality. The clowns brought a light-hearted atmosphere to events they attend, and work to undermine the provocation that police may use by engaging the police with their antics.

The clowns also worked to ensure protection and safety for their fellow activists. They went out of their way to stand in front of police cameras and prevent evidence gathering teams from doing their work. In one instance, when a group of black bloc protestors were surrounded by police during the Make Poverty History march, the Clown Army encircled the police until the protestors were released. Similarly, if one of the clownbattants is arrested, the rest of the army would surround the police station, decorating the exterior and celebrating wildly until the clown is released to them.

If any potentially violent confrontations with police arise, the Clown Army will often step in front of other protestors, because, in the words of co-founder Larry Bogad, it “is politically more costly to club a clown on camera than it would be to do the same thing to a demonstrator”.

=== War on Error ===
The "War on Error", a parody of the war on terror, was a framing device used by CIRCA as a basis for all of the issues they concerned themselves with. "Errorisms" could be anything CIRCA deemed as having a negative impact on the world and stood against. Examples of errorism that the Clown Army provided included privatization, imperial wars, pollution, and neoliberalism. Each of CIRCA's undertakings were under the larger umbrella of fighting in the War on Error.

== International impact ==
Since the 2005 protest against the G8 summit, rebel clowning has become an internationally utilized form of protest, with CIRCA inspiring many different rebel clown offshoots in countries such as Germany, Israel, Belgium, Spain, France, and the Netherlands. Many original members of the Clown Army have gone on to work on other projects that incorporate elements of rebel clowning.

Another clown army joined the protests against the 33rd G8 summit in Germany in 2007, and in Finland, a group called the LOLdiers of Odin parody and mock anti-immigration group the Soldiers of Odin. Groups of rebel climate clowns work to raise awareness about climate change and protest poor environmental policy.

In the American South, rebel clowns have responded against neo-Nazi and Ku Klux Klan rallies. The Bike Lane Liberation Clowns in New York City have acted to improve bicycle-friendly infrastructure in the city, and rebel clown group the Boredom Patrol confronts and satirizes the paramilitary Minutemen who patrol the United States-Mexico border.

== Police infiltration ==
In 2020, the Undercover Policing Inquiry (UCPI) opened a public inquiry into the undercover infiltration and policing of activist groups on behalf of 18 core participants, including the Clandestine Insurgent Rebel Clown Army. The inquiry asserted that CIRCA had been infiltrated by undercover police in the early 2000s, with one officer, known as EN34, having joined and participated in the group under the fake name of 'Lynn Watson'.

== See also ==
- Loldiers of Odin
- Overpass Light Brigade
- Tactical frivolity
