= Billionaires for Bush =

Political street theater organization

Billionaires for Bush was a culture jamming political street theater organization that satirically purported to support George W. Bush, drawing attention to policies which were perceived to benefit corporations and the super-wealthy. The group would typically dress as parodies of wealthy "establishment" figures in tuxedos while proclaiming slogans such as "Two Million Jobs Lost—It's a Start".

A secret New York City Police Department intelligence report, based on undercover surveillance of the group in 2003 and 2004 in advance of the 2004 Republican National Convention in New York City, described the Billionaires as "an activist group forged as a mockery of the current president and political policies".

== History ==
=== Forbes 1999 ===
The organization had first been founded by Andrew Boyd as "Billionaires for Forbes", but Forbes left the 2000 race for the Republican presidential nomination early due to a lack of adequate voter support. In 1999, Billionaires were present as Steve Forbes announced his candidacy for president and jeered him as he signed a flat tax pledge in New Hampshire. The Billionaire Manual describes the action:

They wore conservative jackets and ties (but no bowler hats, etc.) and carried innocuous signs such as "Run, Steve, Run." Happy to have grass-roots support, the Forbes handlers (who believed the Billionaires were students from a nearby business school) placed them in front of the cameras, very near to the podium from which Forbes was speaking. However, each of their signs had another sign behind it. And behind their banner (which read "Forbes 2000: He wants YOU to win") was another banner, waiting. At the most dramatic moment of his announcement, the Billionaires flipped their signs, and pulled away the large banner to reveal one which read: "Billionaires for Forbes: Because Inequality isn't Growing Fast Enough." The Billionaires started chanting "Let workers pay the tax so investors can relax!" and other slogans. Forbes and his handlers were completely thrown off, a little tussle ensued, and the Billionaires were pushed off to the side away from the cameras. Not wanting to miss the action, half the TV crews left the Forbes speech to cover the Billionaires. The action got lots of coverage.

=== Bush (or Gore) 2000 ===
During the 2000 U.S. presidential election the organization was led by Andrew Boyd and Jenny Levison as "Billionaires for Bush (or Gore)," with the message that whichever candidate became president, corporations and the wealthy were guaranteed to benefit. The group spoke out under the motto "Because Economic Inequality Is Not Growing Fast Enough".

The group appeared at the 2000 Democratic National Convention in Los Angeles, California, satirically praising major corporations for their financial support of the convention by attempting to deliver thank you cards to Fleet Bank, Fidelity Investments and Verizon Communications.

The Billionaires planned a "Million Billionaires March" at the 2000 Republican National Convention in Philadelphia held the day before the convention. Other activities included a "Vigil for corporate welfare" and an auction of corporate advertising rights for the Liberty Bell.

=== Bush 2004 ===
At a March 2004 fundraiser on Long Island attended by President Bush, Billionaires for Bush came to show their "support", with men dressed in tuxedos with top hats and women in evening gowns and long gloves. The group's laminated posters featured such slogans as "Leave No Billionaire Behind" and "Corporations Are People Too".

Their largest events to date took place as part of the 2004 Republican National Convention protest activity. A separate group, however, continued on in the plague-on-both-your-houses style as "Billionaires For Bush Or Kerry".

A "Million Billionaires March" on July 27, 2004, in conjunction with the 2004 Democratic National Convention in Boston, Massachusetts, attracted 150 marchers who presented a faux check made out for the amount of "whatever it takes" to the local offices of the Republican Party, as part of an effort to "defeat" Kerry.

Lawsuits filed against the New York City Police Department after the 2004 Republican Convention uncovered the fact that Billionaires for Bush had been among groups infiltrated by the NYPD by its undercover officers gathering intelligence in advance of the convention.

=== 2005 and beyond ===
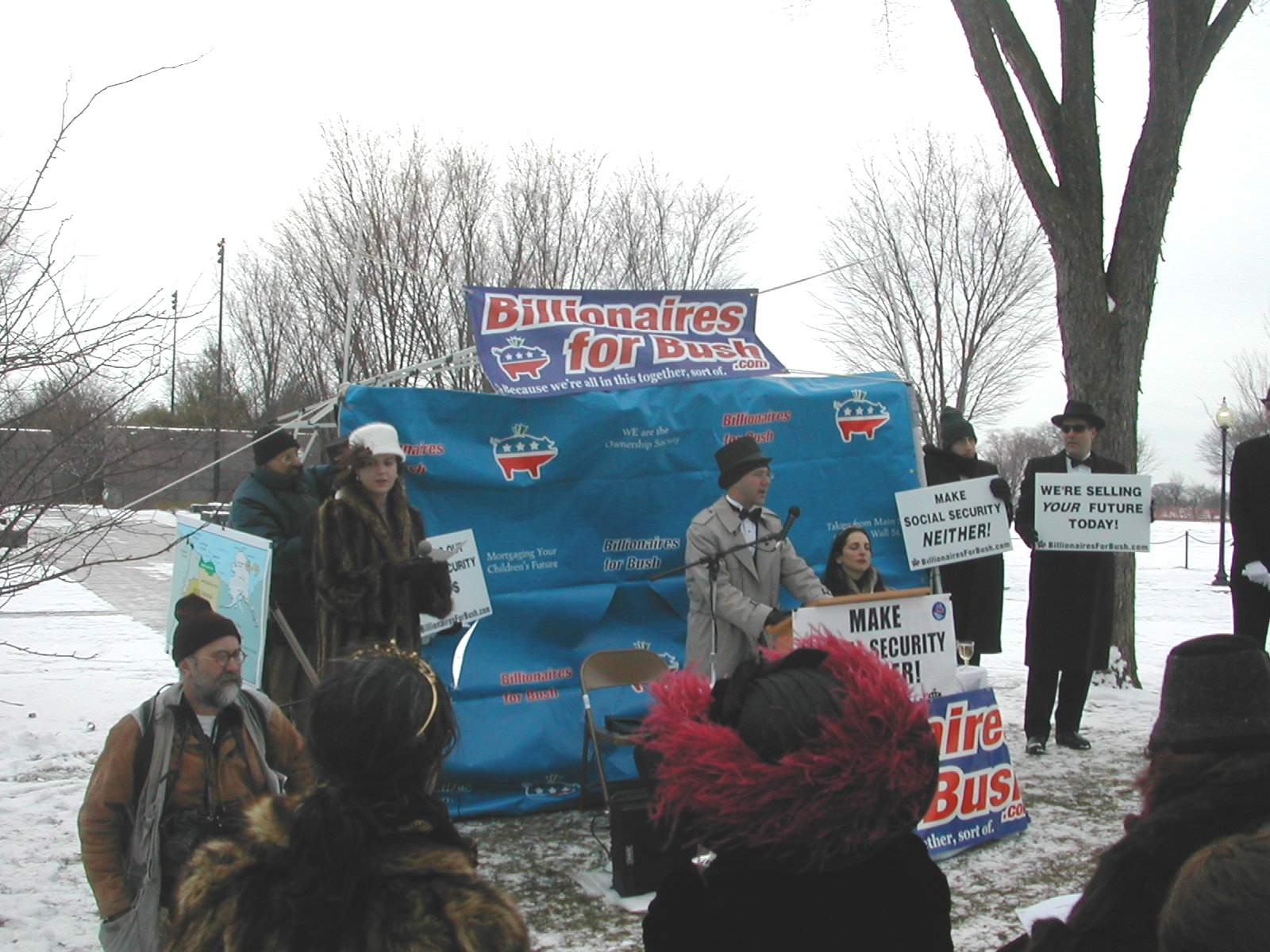
Billionaires for Bush holding a "Social Security Auction" during Bush's 2005 inauguration to protest his planned privatization of Social Security

The group remained active after 2004, but was less prominent. It used its established meme to raise awareness to a myriad of economic issues including Social Security privatization, the Iraq War, the Estate Tax and gentrification.

The group was led by a triumvirate of co-chairs Elissa Jiji, Marco Ceglie, and Melody Bates.

The group has inspired a similar street theater organization, Trillionaires for Trump, to become active in spring 2025. In their Meta social media accounts, Trillionaires for Trump claim to be a continuation of the Billiionaires for Bush group.

== Attire ==
Members typically dressed in stereotypical wealthy attire, such as tuxedos and top hats or evening gowns and pearls and adopt names like "Mo Bludfer Oyle" (more blood for oil, a reference to the Iraq war) and "Phil T. Rich" (filthy rich).

Members also dressed in less stereotypical attire to perform more subtle pranks, as described in the Forbes example, above.

== Events ==
Examples of Billionaire events include:

- Musical entertainment at anti-Bush events
- Thanking George W. Bush on his birthday for their tax cuts
- Protesting protests of the Bush administration
- Taking a pro-war stance at peace rallies
- Cross-country limousine tours
- A petition to allow oil drilling and logging of Golden Gate Park in San Francisco
- Bush League baseball

These events and message were designed to attract media coverage.

== Slogans ==
Some of their political slogans include "Small Government, Big Wars," "Because We're All In This Together, Sort Of," "Two Million Jobs Lost—It's a Start," "Leave No Billionaire Behind," "Make Social Security Neither," and "Corporations are People Too."

== See also ==
- Don't Just Vote, Get Active, a protest organization set up for the 2004 presidential election that denounced the electoral system
- Swiftboat Veterans for Truth, an organization that attacked Kerry's 2004 bid.
- The Yes Men
- Billionaires for Wealthcare
