= Ultra-Tories =

- Leader: Sir Richard Vyvyan, 8th Baronet; Sir Edward Knatchbull, 9th Baronet
- Founded: 1820s
- Dissolved: 1830s
- Succeeded by: Conservative Party
- Ideology: Toryism; Anti-Catholicism
- Political position: Far-right
- Religion: Church of England

The Ultra-Tories were an Anglican faction of British and Irish politics that appeared in the 1820s in opposition to Catholic emancipation. The faction was, in the twenty-first century, called the "extreme right-wing" of British and Irish politics.

The Ultra-Tories faction broke away from the governing party in 1829 after the passing of the Roman Catholic Relief Act 1829. Many of those labelled Ultra-Tory rejected the label and saw themselves as upholders of the Whig Revolution settlement of 1689.

The Ultra-Tories were defending "a doctrine essentially similar to that which ministerial Whigs had held since the days of Burnet, Wake, Gibson and Potter".

== History ==
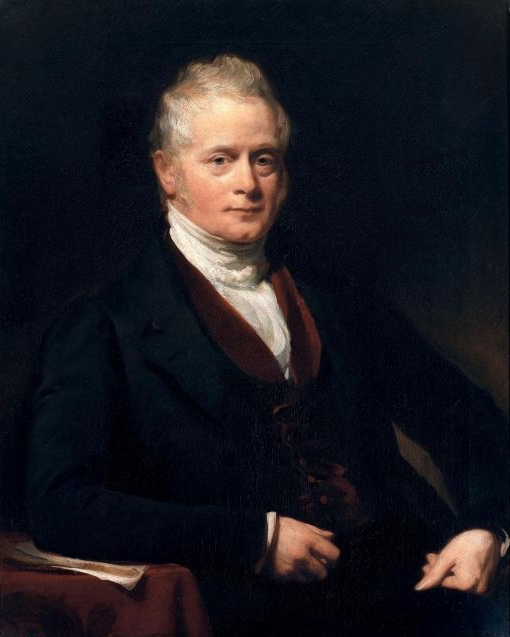
Sir Edward Knatchbull by Thomas Phillips.

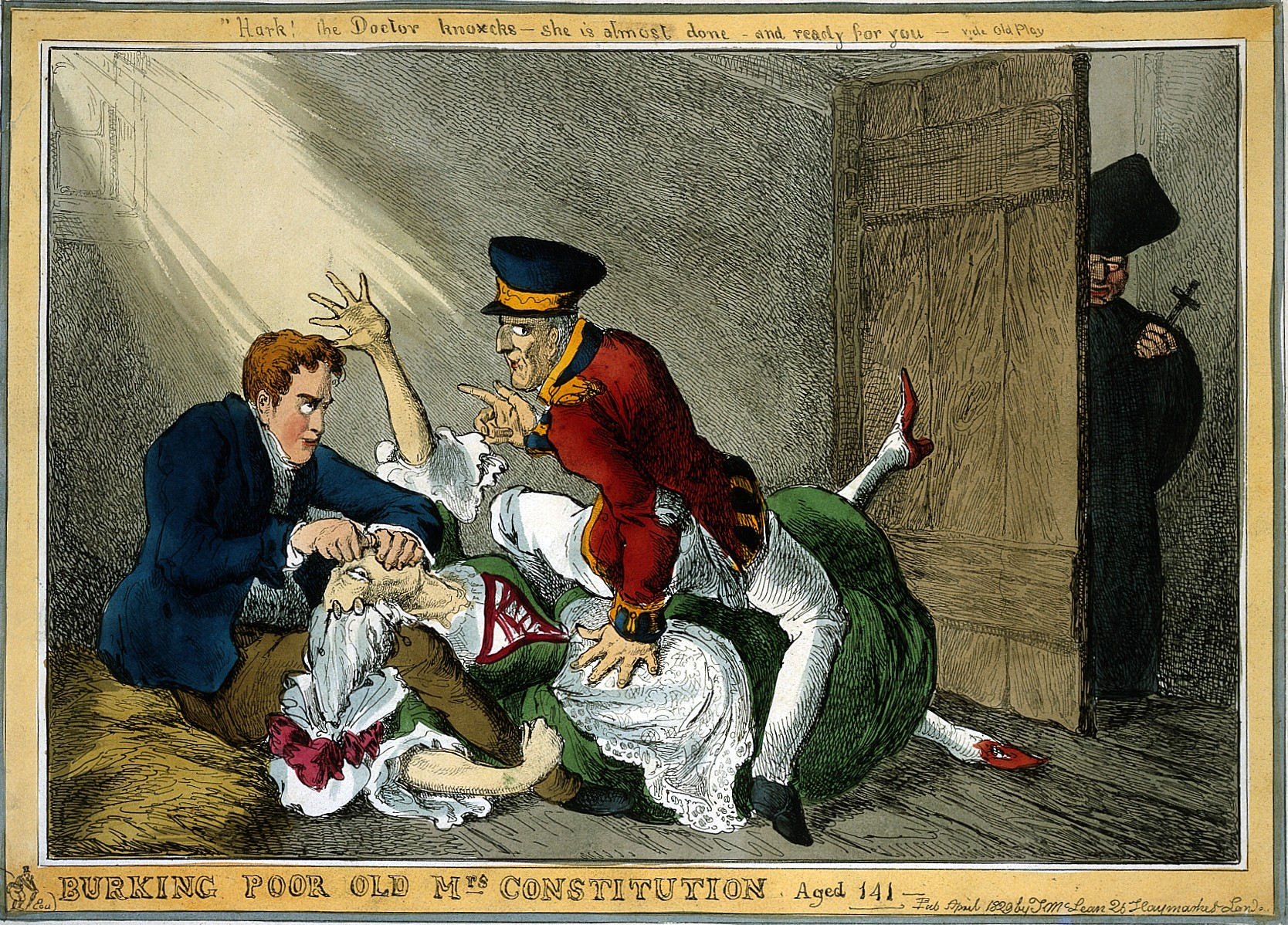
Burking Poor Old Mrs Constitution by William Heath, 1829. Wellington and Peel are shown murdering the 1688 British Constitution in the style of notorious killers Burke and Hare.

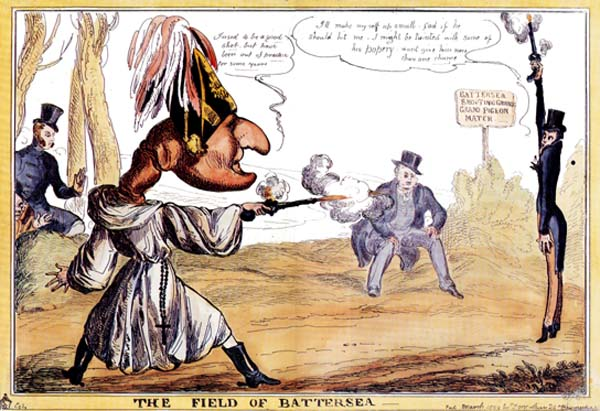
William Heath's caricature of the duel between the Ultra-Tory Earl of Winchilsea and Prime Minister the Duke of Wellington at Battersea Fields on 21 March 1829.

A faction that was never formally organised, the Ultra-Tories were united in their antipathy towards the Duke of Wellington and Sir Robert Peel for what they saw as a betrayal of Tory political and religious principle on the issue of Catholic emancipation. They took their opposition to Peel to the extent of successfully running Robert Inglis to defeat Peel when he resigned his Oxford University seat after his change of opinion in 1829. Although Peel was able to get back to Parliament via another seat, this battle further embittered internal party relations.

The Ultra-Tory faction was informally led in the House of Commons by Member of Parliament Sir Edward Knatchbull and Sir Richard Vyvyan. In the House of Lords, they enjoyed the support of a number of ex-cabinet ministers and leading peers including Duke of Cumberland, the Earl of Winchilsea and the Duke of Newcastle. Their general viewpoint could be described as extreme on the matter of defending the established Anglican ascendancy and barring Catholics from political office or influence. However, they were split on the issue of electoral reform, as large group came to think that it could strengthen the appeal of pro-Protestantism. On 21 March 1829 Winchilsea and Wellington fought the bloodless Wellington–Winchilsea duel at Battersea Fields over the issue of Catholic emancipation.

The inability of the Tories to reunite led to losses in the 1830 general election following the death of King George IV. The King's demise, the news of the July Revolution in France, and a series of bad harvests in England all combined to foment a great increase in political agitation, causing some Ultras to return to the party. However, there were sufficient Ultra-Tories left to combine with the Whigs and the Canningites and defeat Wellington, who finally resigned in November 1830. Ironically, the Canningites had previously split from the main Tory party back in 1827–1828 over the issue of Catholic emancipation, which the Canningites had supported.

Wellington's departure led to the creation of a government with Lord Grey as Prime Minister and the leading Canningites such as Lord Palmerston and Lord Melbourne. One leading Ultra-Tory, the Duke of Richmond, joined the Grey Cabinet and a few others appointed in more junior ministerial positions. However, the scope of the subsequent reforms proved too much for many of the pro-government Ultras who then moved back into opposition. Eventually, Richmond left the Whig led coalition and returned to the Tory party, or the Conservative Party as it was generally now known, after 1834.

Except for a few irreconcilables the vast bulk of the Ultra-Tories eventually moved over to the Conservatives, with some such as Knatchbull enjoying political office in Peel's first government in 1834. However, when the party split again in 1846 over the issue of abolishing the Corn Laws, the remaining Ultra-Tories quickly rallied to the protectionist banner and helped vote Peel out of office once again, this time for good.

The Ultra-Tories were civilian politicians. In practice, they had the overwhelming support of the Anglican clergy and bishops, many of whom came under severe verbal attack in their home parishes and dioceses for opposition to the Reform Act 1832.

== Legacy ==
J. C. D. Clark depicts England before 1828 as a nation in which the vast majority of the people believed in the divine right of kings, the legitimacy of a hereditary nobility and in the rights and privileges of the Anglican Church. In Clark's interpretation, the system remained virtually intact until it suddenly collapsed in 1828 because Catholic emancipation undermined Anglican supremacy which was its central symbolic prop. Clark argues that the consequences were enormous: "The shattering of a whole social order [...]. What was lost at that point [...] was not merely a constitutional arrangement, but the intellectual ascendancy of a worldview, the cultural hegemony of the old elite". Clark's interpretation has been widely debated in the scholarly literature and almost every single historian who has examined the issue has highlighted the substantial amount of continuity between the periods before and after 1828–1832.

Eric J. Evans emphasizes that the political importance of Catholic emancipation in 1829 was that it split the anti-reformers beyond repair and diminished their ability to block future reform laws, especially the great Reform Act 1832. Paradoxically, Wellington's success in forcing through emancipation converted many Ultra-Tories to demand reform of Parliament. They saw that the votes of the rotten boroughs had given the government its majority. Therefore, it was the Ultra-Tory the Marquess of Blandford who in February 1830 introduced the first major reform bill, calling for the transfer of rotten borough seats to the counties and large towns, the disfranchisement of non-resident voters, preventing Crown office-holders from sitting in Parliament, the payment of a salary to MPs and the general franchise for men who owned property. Such ultras believed that somewhat more open elections would be relied upon to oppose Catholic equality.

== See also ==
- Fourth Party
- Hughligans
