= Cliffhanger =

Plot device used in fiction

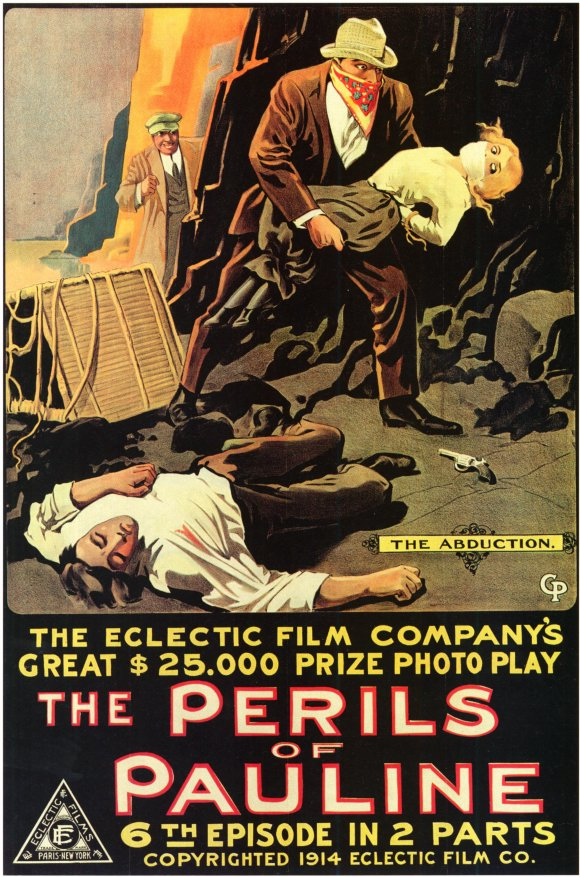
The 1914 film serial Perils of Pauline was shown in bi-weekly installments and ended with a cliffhanger.

A cliffhanger is a plot device in fiction that places a main character in an unresolved, precarious situation—such as a sudden danger, a difficult dilemma, or a shocking revelation—at the conclusion of a narrative installment. The device is designed to incentivize audience retention for subsequent installments.

Serialized narratives may conclude with textual cues such as "To Be Continued" or "The End?", and in serialized television, subsequent episodes frequently utilize a recap sequence.

Cliffhangers were used as literary devices in several works of the Middle Ages with One Thousand and One Nights ending on a cliffhanger each night. Cliffhangers appeared as an element of the Victorian era serial novel that emerged in the 1840s, with many associating the form with Charles Dickens, a pioneer of the serial publication of narrative fiction. Following the enormous success of Dickens, by the 1860s cliffhanger endings had become a staple part of the sensation serials.

== History ==
Cliffhangers were used as literary devices in several works of the Middle Ages. The Arabic literary work One Thousand and One Nights involves Scheherazade narrating a series of stories to King Shahryār for 1,001 nights, with each night ending on a cliffhanger in order to save herself from execution. Some medieval Chinese ballads like the Liu chih-yuan chu-kung-tiao ended each chapter on a cliffhanger to keep the audience in suspense.

The Scottish comic magazine The Glasgow Looking Glass, founded by English artist William Heath, pioneered the use of the phrase 'To Be Continued' in its serials in 1825.

=== Victorian serials ===
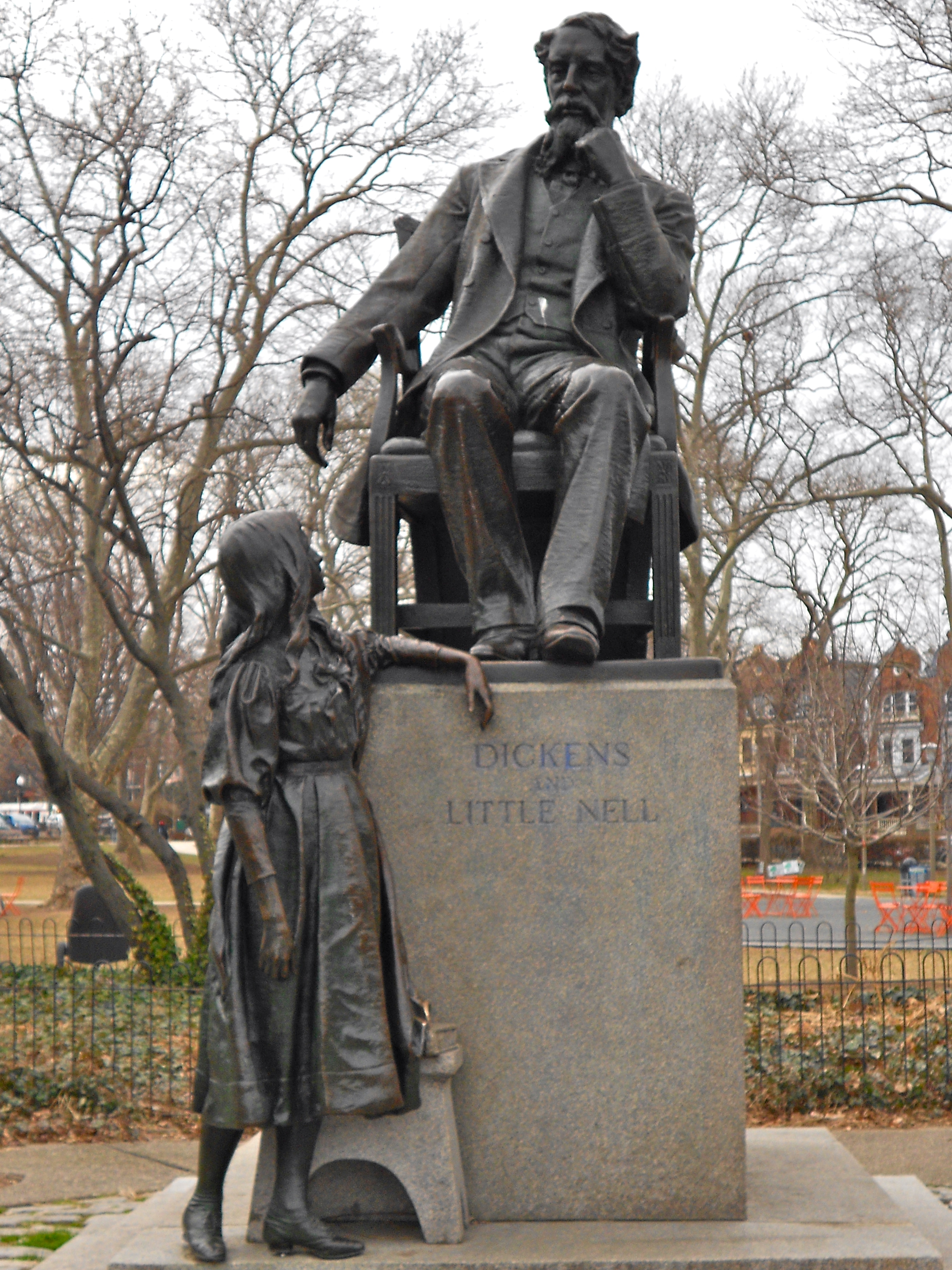
Dickens and Little Nell statue in Philadelphia

Cliffhangers became prominent with the serial publication of narrative fiction, pioneered by Charles Dickens. Printed episodically in magazines, Dickens's cliffhangers triggered desperation in his readers. Writing in the New Yorker, Emily Nussbaum captured the anticipation of those waiting for the next installment of Dickens' The Old Curiosity Shop:

In 1841, Dickens fanboys rioted on the dock of New York Harbor, as they waited for a British ship carrying the next installment, screaming, "Is little Nell dead?"

On Dickens' instalment format and cliffhangers—first seen with The Pickwick Papers in 1836 which featured Sam Weller in the fourth episode—Howsam in The Cambridge Companion to the History of the Book (2015) writes:

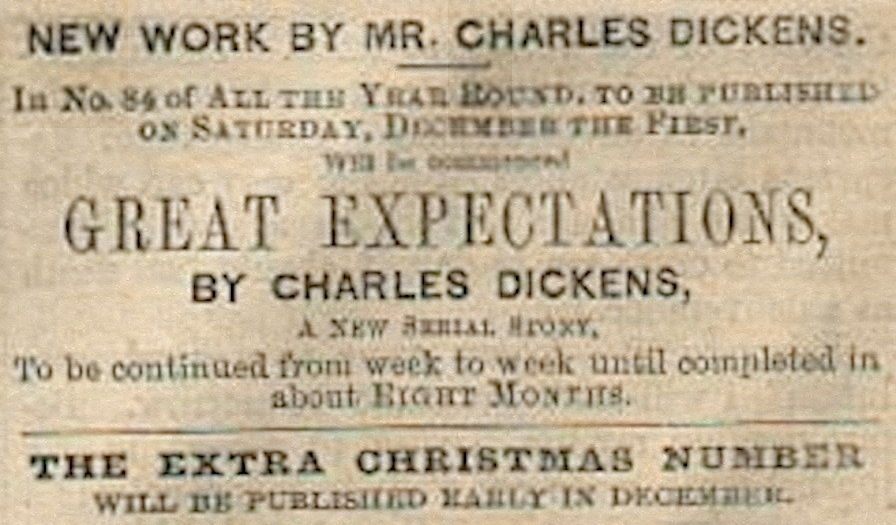
Advertisement for Dickens' Great Expectations serialised in the British weekly magazine All the Year Round, 1860. The advert displays the plot device "to be continued".

It inspired a narrative that Dickens would explore and develop throughout his career. The instalments would typically culminate at a point in the plot that created reader anticipation and thus reader demand.

With each new instalment widely anticipated with its cliffhanger ending, Dickens' audience was enormous; his instalment format was also much more affordable and accessible to the masses, with the audience more evenly distributed across income levels than previous. The popularity of his serial publications saw the cliffhanger become a staple part of the sensation serials by the 1860s. His influence is also seen in television soap operas and film series, with The Guardian stating "the DNA of Dickens's busy, episodic storytelling, delivered in instalments and rife with cliffhangers and diversions, is traceable in everything."

=== Etymology ===
The term "cliff-hanger" is defined by The Oxford English Dictionary as “a serial film in which each episode ends in a desperate situation; hence, any story, play, etc., in which suspense is a main concern.” It records the first use of the term in 1936.

Some have therefore mistakenly considered its origins to have originated with the serialised version of Thomas Hardy's A Pair of Blue Eyes (which was published in Tinsley's Magazine between September 1872 and July 1873) in which Henry Knight, one of the protagonists, is left hanging off a cliff.

In his book of essays, The Art of Fiction, David Lodge refers to this moment in Hardy's novel as "a classic scene of suspense that was, as far as I know, entirely invented. The word [suspense] derives from the Latin word meaning 'to hang', and there could hardly be a situation more productive of suspense than of a man clinging by his finger-tips to the face of a cliff unable to climb to safety - hence the generic term, 'cliff-hanger'". Lodge does not claim this is the origin of the term; just that Hardy presents a literal rendering of it in prose.

== Serial media ==
=== Film ===
Cliffhangers were especially popular from the 1910s through to the mid-1950s serials when nickelodeons and movie theatres filled the cultural niche later primarily occupied by television. The first film serial designed around the cliffhanger device was 1913's The Adventures of Kathlyn from Selig Polyscope.

Film serials were normally shown in cinemas at weekly intervals, with the cliffhanger resolved in the next instalment by a "take-out', which extracted the protagonist(s) from the perilous situation in which they had been left. Hoping that audiences would forget some important details of what they had seen a week earlier, filmmakers sometimes resolved the peril by changing some of the events in the recap sequence. The cinema scholar Deborah Allison argues that cliffhanger take-outs can be grouped into three categories, which she calls 'sequential', 'augmented' and 'incompatible'.

Sequential take-outs continue the story either by revealing pertinent facts in subsequent shots or by skipping potentially tricky explanations entirely and moving on swiftly. [...] whereas sequential take-outs fill the gaps in our knowledge after we have been shown the moment of fatal peril for the second time, augmented take-outs insert supplementary shots or scenes before the point of crisis. [...] Incompatible take-outs present narrative information that directly conflicts with that provided by the original cliffhanger.

During the 1910s, when Fort Lee, New Jersey was a centre of film production, the cliffs facing New York and the Hudson River were frequently used as film locations. The most notable of these films was The Perils of Pauline, a serial which helped popularise the term "cliffhanger". In them, the serial would often end suddenly leaving actress Pearl White's Pauline character hanging from a cliff.

=== Modern usage ===
Cliffhangers are often used in television series, especially soap operas and game shows.

Several Australian soap operas, which went off air over summer, such as Number 96, The Restless Years and Prisoner, ended each year with a major and much-publicised catastrophe, such as a character being shot in the final seconds of the year's closing episode.

Cliffhangers are commonly used in Japanese manga and anime. In contrast to American superhero comics, Japanese manga are much more frequently written with cliffhangers, often with each volume or issue. This is particularly the case with shōnen manga, especially those published by Weekly Shōnen Jump, such as Dragon Ball, Shaman King, One Piece and the origin show of the To be continued Internet meme, JoJo's Bizarre Adventure.

During its original run, Doctor Who was written in a serialised format that usually ended each episode within a serial on a cliffhanger. In the first few years of the show, the final episodes of each serial would have a cliffhanger that would lead into the next serial. The programme's cliffhangers sometimes caused controversy, most notably Part Three of The Deadly Assassin (1976), which was altered for future broadcasts following a complaint from campaigner Mary Whitehouse. Whitehouse objected to the violence of the scene (the Doctor's head is held underwater in an attempt to drown him). She often cited it in interviews as one of the most frightening scenes in Doctor Who, her reasoning being that children would not know if the Doctor survived until the following week and that they would "have this strong image in their minds" during all that time. The producer of Doctor Who at the time, Philip Hinchcliffe, cited the 1950s radio serial Journey into Space as an influence for its use of cliffhangers. A later serial, Dragonfire (1987), is notable for having a cliffhanger that involved the Seventh Doctor literally hanging from a cliff, seemingly by choice, which has been described as "the most ludicrous ever presented in Doctor Who".

From 1966 to 1968 and in broadcast syndication, "Same bat-time, same bat-channel" encouraged viewers to tune in the next night for 120 episodes of Batman. The next episode quickly resolved the heroes from each supervillain's trap. A few triple episodes had double cliffhangers.

The 1969 British caper film The Italian Job, starring Michael Caine and Noël Coward, ends literally in a cliffhanger, with the villains' coach hanging precariously over a cliff.

Cliffhangers were rare on American primetime television before 1980, as television networks preferred the flexibility of airing episodes in any order. The sitcom Soap was the first US primetime television programme to utilise the end-of-season cliffhanger, at the end of its first season in 1978. Cliffhangers then went on to become a staple of American primetime soap operas; the phenomenal success of the 1980 "Who shot J.R.?" third season-ending cliffhanger of Dallas, and the "Who Done It" fourth-season episode that finally solved the mystery, contributed to the cliffhanger becoming a common storytelling device on American television. Another notable cliffhanger was the "Moldavian Massacre" on Dynasty in 1985, which fuelled speculation throughout the summer months regarding who lived or died when almost all the characters attended a wedding in the country of Moldavia, only to have revolutionaries topple the government and machine-gun the entire wedding party. Other primetime soap operas, such as Falcon Crest and Knots Landing, also employed dramatic end-of-season cliffhangers on an annual basis. Sitcoms also utilised the cliffhanger device. As well as the aforementioned Soap, the long-running sitcom Cheers would often incorporate cliffhanger season endings, largely (in its earlier years) to increase interest in the on-and-off relationship between its two lead characters, Sam Malone and Diane Chambers. These cliffhangers did not place the characters in peril of any kind, but rather left their relationship (which was at the core of the show) hanging in the balance.

Cliffhanger endings in films date back to the early 20th century, and were prominently used in the serial films of the 1930s (such as Flash Gordon and Buck Rogers), though these tended to be resolved with the next installment the following week. A longer term cliffhanger was employed in the Star Wars film series, in The Empire Strikes Back (1980) in which Darth Vader makes a shock revelation to Luke Skywalker, and Han Solo's life is left in jeopardy after he is frozen and taken away by a bounty hunter. Some film critics distinguish the film's ending from a traditional mid-action cliffhanger, arguing instead that it functions as an open-ended "sequel hook" because it resolves its immediate third-act narrative—the escape from Cloud City—while leaving the broader trilogy arc open. The first two films in the Back to the Future series end in cliffhangers, with the first displaying the "to be continued" title card. The film adaptation of the musical Wicked is split into two parts, with the first film ending on a cliffhanger with the first act closer "Defying Gravity", making the second film Wicked: For Good begin at the top of the musical's second act.

The two main ways for cliffhangers to keep readers/viewers coming back is to either involve characters in a suspenseful, possibly life-threatening situation, or to feature a sudden shocking revelation. Cliffhangers are also used to leave open the possibility of a character being killed off due to the actor not continuing to play the role.

Cliffhangers are also sometimes deliberately inserted by writers who are uncertain whether a new series or season will be commissioned, in the hope that viewers will demand to know how the situation is resolved. Such was the case with the second season of Twin Peaks, which ended in a cliffhanger similar to the first season with a high degree of uncertainty about the fate of the protagonist, but the cliffhanger could not save the show from being cancelled, resulting in the unresolved ending. The final episodes of soaps Dallas and Dynasty also ended in similar fashion, though all three shows would return years later in some form or other to resolve these storylines. The Australian soap opera Return To Eden ended in 1986 with a dramatic cliffhanger in anticipation of a second season. However, the network chose not to renew the show and so a hastily filmed five-minute "conclusion" was made and added on to the end of existing final episode to provide closure. Some shows, however, became known for never being resolved. These included British science fiction series Blake's 7, the American supernatural series Angel, the original 1984 series V and its 2009 remake, all of which ended with unresolved cliffhangers. On occasion, TV series are given the opportunity to resolve their end-of-series cliffhangers at a later date; examples include the 1999–2003 series, Farscape, which was cancelled after a cliffhanger ending, but which was able to resolve it in a later follow-up miniseries, Farscape: The Peacekeeper Wars; and the aforementioned Twin Peaks 1991 cliffhanger, which was resolved 26 years later when a sequel to the series (considered a third season) aired in 2017.

The cliffhanger has become a genre staple (especially in comics, due to the multi-part storylines becoming the norm instead of self-contained stories) to such a degree that series writers no longer feel they have to be immediately resolved, or even referenced, when the next episode is shown, variously because the writer did not feel it was "a strong enough opener", or simply "couldn't be bothered". The heavily serialised television drama True Blood has become notorious for cliffhangers. Not only do the seasons conclude with cliffhangers, but almost every episode finishes at a cliffhanger directly after or during a highly dramatic moment, much like the primetime soap operas of the 1980s and 90s.

Commercial breaks can be a nuisance to script writers because some sort of incompleteness or a minor cliffhanger should be provided before each to stop the viewer from changing channels during the commercial break. Sometimes a series ends with an unintended cliffhanger caused by a very abrupt ending without a satisfactory dénouement, but merely assuming that the viewer will assume that everything sorted itself out.

Sometimes a film, book, or season of a television show will end with the defeat of the main villain before a second, evidently more powerful villain makes a brief appearance (becoming the villain of the next film). Occasionally an element other than a villain is also used to tease at a sequel.

Peter Høeg's novel Smilla's Sense of Snow ends with a deliberate cliffhanger, with the protagonist and main villain involved in a life-and-death chase on the Arctic ice off Greenland – and in this case, the author has no intention of ever writing a sequel, the ambiguous ending being part and parcel of the basic ideas permeating the book's plot. Similarly, Michael Flynn's science fiction novelette The Forest of Time ends with a deliberate and permanent cliffhanger: readers are not to be ever told where the protagonist ended up in his wandering the "forest" of alternative history timelines and whether he ever got back to his home and his beloved, nor whether the war which takes a large part of the plot ended in victory for the protagonists or the antagonists.

George Cukor, when adapting in 1972 Graham Greene's Travels with My Aunt, deliberately introduced a cliffhanger missing from the original. While Greene's book ended with the protagonists definitely choosing the adventurous and rather shady life of smugglers in Paraguay and closing off other options for their future, at the conclusion of the Cukor film a character is seen tossing a coin whose fall would determine their next move, and the film ends on a freeze frame shot as the characters await the fall of the coin.

== See also ==
- Back-to-back film production
- Zeigarnik effect

== Books ==
- Vincent Fröhlich: Der Cliffhanger und die serielle Narration. Bielefeld: Transcript Verlag, 2015. ISBN 978-3837629767.
