= Speech balloon =

Graphic convention in comics to show speech

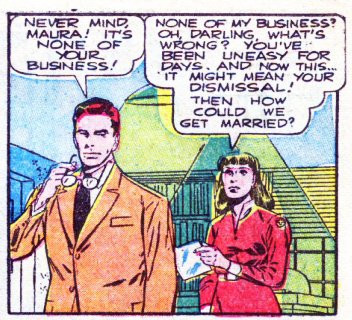
Speech balloons in a 1948 US comic strip

Speech balloons (also speech bubbles, dialogue balloons, or word balloons) are a graphic convention used most commonly in comic books, comics, and cartoons to allow words (and much less often, pictures) to be understood as representing a character's speech or thoughts. A formal distinction is often made between the balloon that indicates speech and the one that indicates thoughts; the balloon that conveys thoughts is often referred to as a thought bubble or conversation cloud.

== History ==
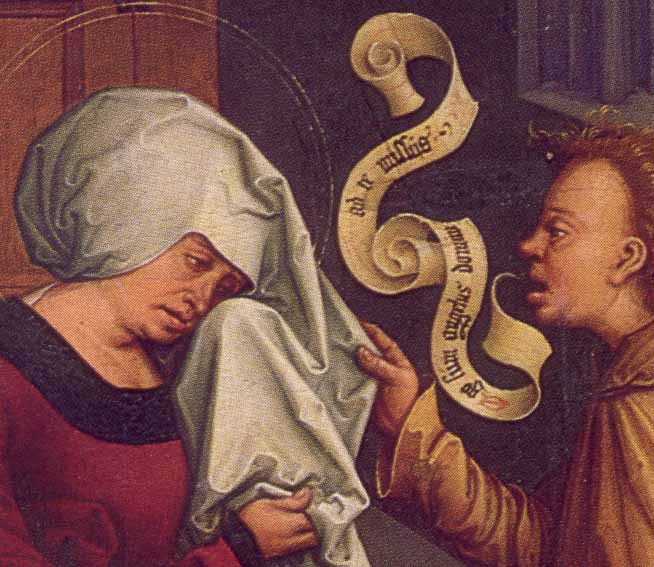
Before the 20th century, speech was depicted using bands, flags, scrolls, or sheets of paper. Detail of The Annunciation to Saint Anne (1506) by Bernhard Strigel.

One of the earliest antecedents to the modern speech bubble was the "speech scroll", a wispy line that connected first-person speech to the mouth of the speaker in Mesoamerican art between 600 and 900 CE. Elsewhere, paintings depicting stories in subsequent frames with descriptive text resembling speech balloons were used in murals. One such example, written in Greek and dating to the 2nd century, was found in Capitolias in modern-day Jordan.

In Western graphic art, labels that reveal what a pictured figure is saying have appeared since at least the 13th century. These were in common European use by the early 16th century. Word balloons (also known as "banderoles") began appearing in 18th-century printed broadsides, and political cartoons from the American Revolution (including some published by Benjamin Franklin) often used them—as did cartoonist James Gillray in Britain. They later became disused, but by 1904 had regained their popularity, although they were still considered novel enough to require explanation. With the development of the comics industry during the 20th century, the appearance of speech balloons has become increasingly standardized, though the formal conventions that have evolved in different cultures (USA as opposed to Japan, for example) can be quite distinct.

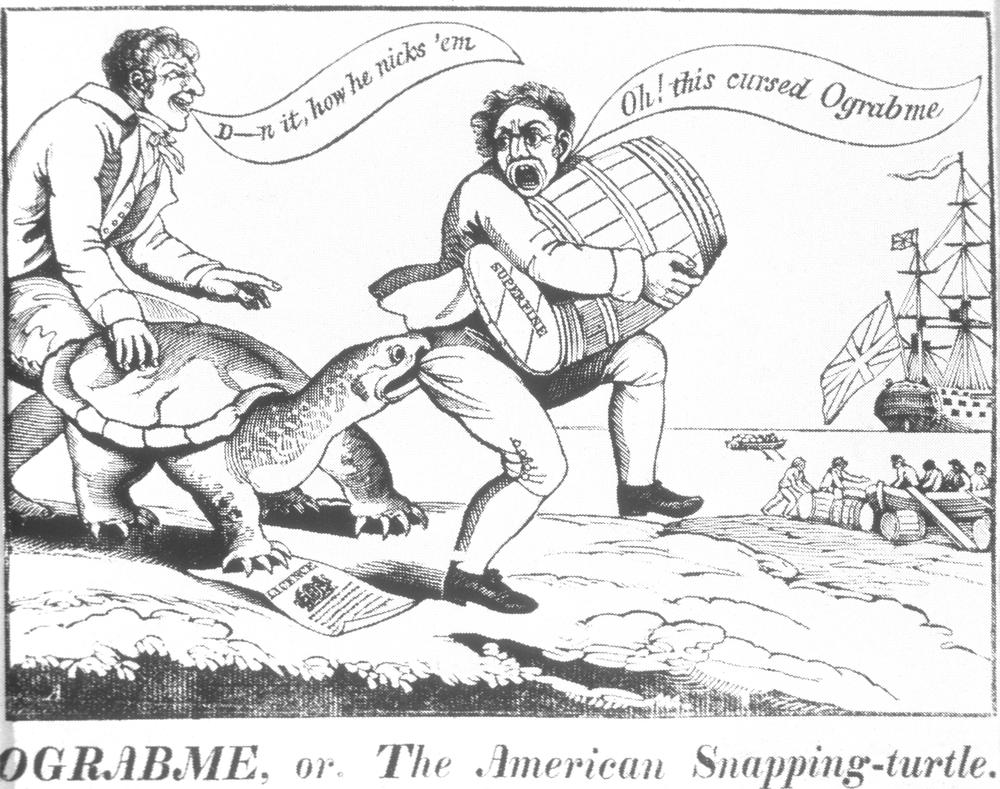
In this political cartoon opposing the Embargo Act of 1807, the form and function of speech balloons is already similar to their modern use.

In the UK in 1825 The Glasgow Looking Glass, regarded as the world's first comics magazine, was created by English satirical cartoonist William Heath. Containing the world's first comic strip, it also made it the first to use speech bubbles.

Richard F. Outcault's Yellow Kid is generally credited as the first American comic strip character. His words initially appeared on his yellow shirt, but word balloons very much like those used presently were added almost immediately, as early as 1896. By the start of the 20th century, word balloons were ubiquitous; since that time, few American comic strips and comic books have relied on captions, notably Hal Foster's Prince Valiant and the early Tarzan comic strip during the 1930s. In Europe, where text comics were more common, the adoption of speech balloons was slower, with well-known examples being Alain Saint-Ogan's Zig et Puce (1925), Hergé's The Adventures of Tintin (1929), and Rob-Vel's Spirou (1938).

Speech balloons are not necessarily popular or well-known in all parts of the world. During the Gulf War, an American propaganda leaflet that used a thought bubble proved puzzling to Iraqi soldiers: according to one PSYOP specialist this was because the technique was not known in Iraq, and readers "had no idea why Saddam's head was floating in the air."

The four most common speech balloons, top to bottom: speech, whisper, thought, scream

== Captions ==
Captions are generally used for narration purposes, such as showing location and time, or conveying editorial commentary. They are generally rectangular and positioned near the edge of the panel. Often they are also colored to indicate the difference between themselves and the word balloons used by the characters, which are almost always white. Increasingly in modern comics, captions are frequently used to convey an internal monologue or typical speech.

== Artist-specific variations ==
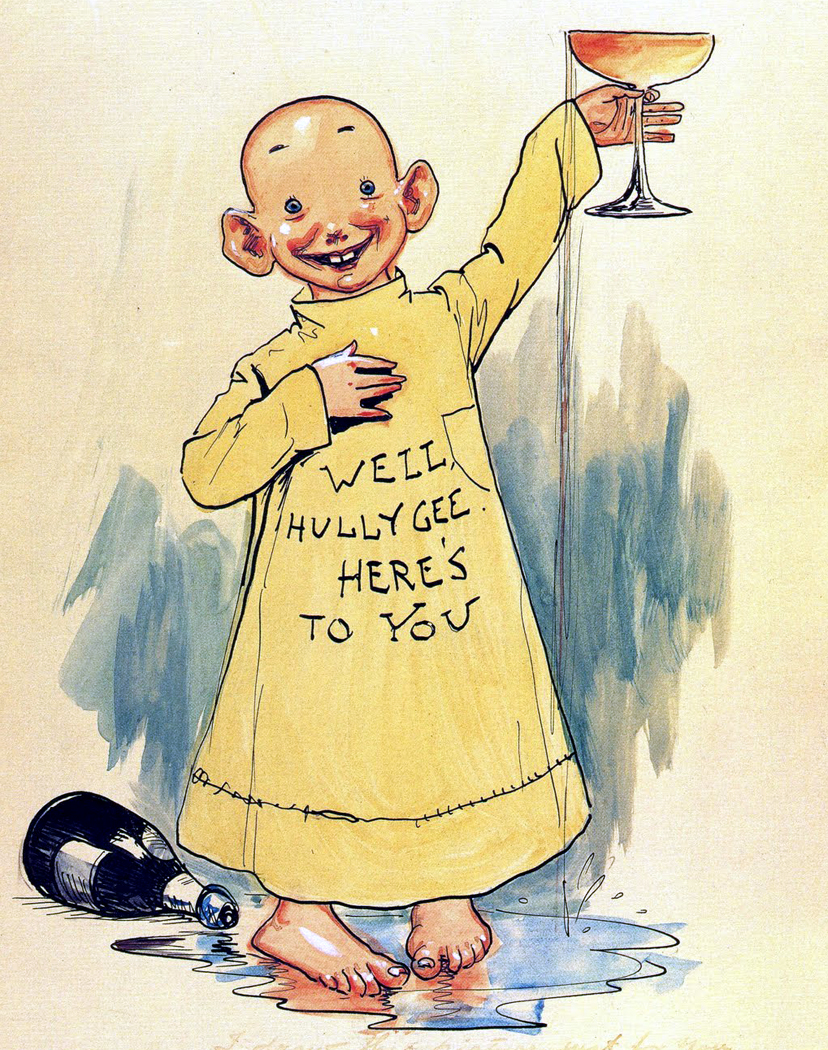
The Yellow Kid's words appear on his shirt.

Some characters and strips use unconventional methods of communication. Perhaps the most notable is the Yellow Kid, an early American comic strip character. His (but not the other characters') words would appear on his large, smock-like shirt. Shirt Tales, a short-run American animated TV series of the early 1980s used this same concept, but with changing phrases on the "T-shirts" worn by the animal-based characters, depending on the characters' thoughts.

Also noteworthy are the many variations of the form created by Dave Sim for his comic Cerebus the Aardvark. Depending on the shape, size, and position of the bubble, as well as the texture and shape of the letters within it, Sim could convey large amounts of information about the speaker. This included separate bubbles for different states of mind (drunkenness, etc.), for echoes, and a special class of bubbles for one single floating apparition.

An early pioneer in experimenting with many different types of speech balloons and lettering for different types of speech was Walt Kelly, for his Pogo strip. Deacon Mushrat speaks with blackletter words, P.T. Bridgeport speaks in circus posters, Sarcophagus MacAbre speaks in condolence cards, "Mr. Pig" (a take on Nikita Khrushchev) speaks in faux Cyrillic, etc.

In the famous French comic series Asterix, Goscinny and Uderzo use bubbles without tails to indicate a distant or unseen speaker. They have also experimented with using different types of lettering for characters of different nationalities to indicate that they speak a different language which Asterix may not understand; Goths speak in blackletter, Greeks in angular lettering (though always understood by the Gaulish main characters, so it is more of an accent than a language), Norse with "Nørdic åccents", Egyptians in faux hieroglyphs (depictive illustrations and rebuses), etc. Another experiment with speech bubbles was exclusive to one book, Asterix and the Roman Agent. The agent in question is a vile manipulator who creates discord in a group of people with a single innocent-sounding comment. His victims start quarreling and ultimately fighting each other while speaking in green-colored speech bubbles.

Font variation is a common tactic in comics. The Sandman series, written by Neil Gaiman and lettered by Todd Klein, features many characters whose speech bubbles are written with a font that is exclusive to them. For examples, the main character, the gloomy Dream, speaks in wavy-edged bubbles, completely black, with similarly wavy white lettering. His sister, the scatterbrained and whimsical Delirium speaks in bubbles in a many-colored explosive background with uneven lettering, and the irreverent raven Matthew speaks in a shaky angular kind of bubble with scratchy lettering. Other characters, such as John Dee, have special shapes of bubbles for their own.

For Mad magazine's recurring comic strip Monroe, certain words are written larger or in unusual fonts for emphasis.

In manga, there is a tendency to include the speech necessary for the story line in balloons, while small scribbles outside the balloons add side comments, often used for irony or to show that they are said in a much smaller voice. Satsuki Yotsuba in the manga series Negima is notable because she speaks almost entirely in side scribble.

== Graphic symbols ==
Speech bubbles are used not only to include a character's words, but also emotions, voice inflections and unspecified language.

=== Punctuation marks ===
One of the universal emblems of the art of comics is the use of a single punctuation mark to depict a character's emotions, much more efficiently than any possible sentence. A speech bubble with a single big question mark (?, often drawn by hand, not counted as part of the lettering) denotes confusion or ignorance. An exclamation mark (!) indicates surprise or terror. This device is used much in the European comic tradition, the Belgian artist Hergé's The Adventures of Tintin series being a good example. Sometimes, the punctuation marks stand alone above the character's head, with no bubble needed.

In manga, the ellipsis (i.e. three dots) is also used to express silence in a much more significant way than the mere absence of bubbles. This is especially seen when a character is supposed to say something, to indicate a stunned silence, or when a sarcastic comment is expected by the reader. The ellipsis, along with the big drop of sweat on the character's temple – usually depicting shame, confusion, or embarrassment caused by other people's actions – is one of the Japanese graphic symbols that have become used by other comics around the world, although they are still rare in Western tradition. Japanese has a sound effect for "deafening silence", shiin (シーン/しいん).

=== Foreign languages ===
In many comic books, words that would be foreign to the narration but are displayed in translation for the reader are surrounded by brackets or chevrons ⟨like this⟩.

Gilbert Hernandez's series about Palomar is written in English, but supposed to take place mainly in a Hispanic country. Thus, what is supposed to be representations of Spanish speech is written without brackets, but occasional actual English speech is written within brackets, to indicate that it is unintelligible to the main Hispanophone characters in the series.

Some comics will have the actual foreign language in the speech balloon, with the translation as a footnote; this is done with Latin aphorisms in Asterix. In the webcomic Stand Still, Stay Silent, in which characters may speak up to five different languages in the same scene, most dialogue is unmarked (languages mostly being inferred by who is speaking and to whom), but miniature flags indicate the language being spoken where this is relevant.

Another convention is to put the foreign speech in a distinctive lettering style; for example, Asterix's Goths speak in blackletter.

Since the Japanese language uses two writing directionalities (vertical, which is the traditional direction; and horizontal, as most other languages), manga has a convention of representing translated foreign speech as horizontal text.

=== The big Z ===
It is a convention for American comics that the sound of a snore is represented as a series of Z's, dating back at least to Rudolph Dirks' early 20th-century strip The Katzenjammer Kids. This practice has even been reduced to a single letter Z, so that a speech bubble with this letter standing all alone means the character is sleeping in most humorous comics. This can be seen, for instance, in Charles Schulz's Peanuts comic strips.

The resemblance between the 'z' sound and that of a snore is a frequent feature in other countries. However, in Japanese manga the common symbol for sleep is a large bubble of snot coming out of a character's nose.

=== Drawings within the speech bubble ===
Singing characters usually have musical notes drawn into their word balloons. Archie Comics' Melody Valentine, a character in their Josie and the Pussycats comic, has musical notes drawn into her word balloons at all times, to convey that she speaks in a sing-song voice.

The above-mentioned Albert Uderzo in the Asterix series decorates speech bubbles with beautiful flowers depicting an extremely soft, sweet voice (usually preceding a violent outburst by the same character).

A stormy cloud with a rough lightning shape sticking out of it, either in a bubble or just floating above the character's head as a modified 'cloudy' thought bubble, depicts anger, not always verbally expressed.

Light bulbs are sometimes used when the character thinks of an idea or solution to a problem.

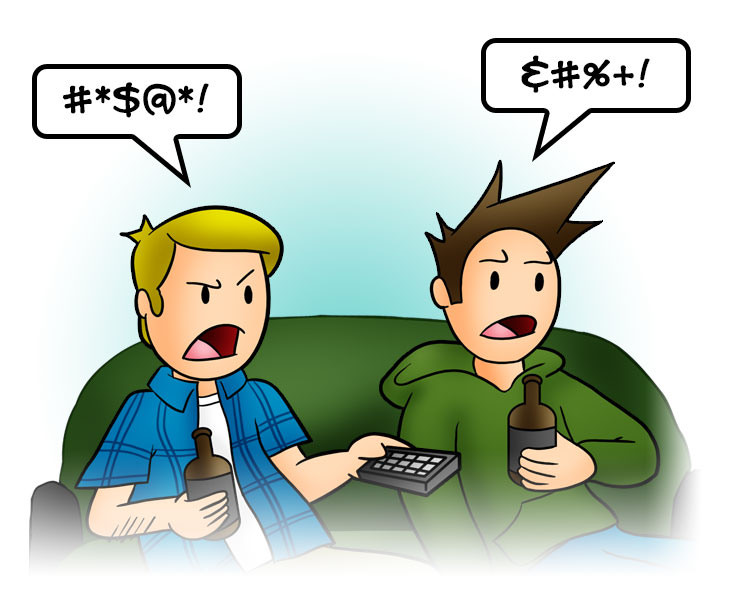
Characters speaking in "grawlix" symbols, to indicate profanity

In the Western world, it is common to replace profanity with a string of nonsense symbols (like &%$@*#), sometimes called grawlixes. In comics that are usually addressed to children or teenagers, bad language is censored by replacing it with more or less elaborate drawings and expressionistic symbols. For example, instead of calling someone a swine, a pig is drawn in the speech bubble.

One example is the Spanish Mortadelo series, created by Francisco Ibáñez. Although not specifically addressed to children, Mortadelo was initiated during Francisco Franco's dictatorship, when censorship was common and rough language was prohibited. When Ibáñez's characters are angry, donkey heads, lightning, lavatories, billy goats and even faux Japanese characters are often seen in their bubbles.

When Mortadelo was portrayed in a movie by Spanish director Javier Fesser in 2003, one of the critiques made to his otherwise successful adaptation was the character's use of words that never appeared in the comics. Fesser claimed: "When you see a bubble speech containing a lightning falling on a pig, what do you imagine the character's saying?"

== Order ==
In order for comic strip and graphic novel dialogue to make sense, it has to be read in order. Thus, conventions have evolved in the order in which the communication bubbles are read. The individual bubbles are read in the order of the language. For example, in English, the bubbles are read from left to right in a panel, while in Japanese, it is the other way around. Sometimes the bubbles are "stacked", with two characters having multiple bubbles, one above the other. Such stacks are read from the top down.

== Lettering ==
Traditionally, a cartoonist or occupational letterer would draw in all the individual letters in the balloons and sound effects by hand. A modern alternative, used by most comics presently and universal in English-translated manga, is to letter with computer programs. The fonts used usually emulate the style of hand-lettering.

Traditionally, most mainstream comic books are lettered entirely in upper-case, with a few exceptions:

- Name particles such as de and von, and the "c" in a surname of Scottish or Irish origin starting with Mc.
- To indicate a frightened or quiet manner of speech.
- An interjection such as "er", "um", etc.

When hand-lettering, upper-case lettering saves time and effort because it requires drawing only three guidelines, while mixed-case lettering requires five.

For a few comics, uppercase and lowercase are used as in ordinary writing. Since the mid-1980s, mixed case lettering has gradually become more widely used in mainstream comic books. Some comics, such as Pearls Before Swine, also use lowercase speech to mark a distinctive accent (in this case, the male crocodiles' accented speech, opposed to all other characters who use standard uppercase speech).

From 2002 to 2004, Marvel Comics experimented with mixed-case lettering for all its comic books. Most mainstream titles have since returned to traditional all upper-case lettering.

For many comics, although the lettering is entirely in capital letters, serif versions of "I" are used exclusively where a capital I would appear in normal print text, and a sans-serif (i.e., a simple vertical line) is used in all other places. This reduces confusion with the number one, and also serves to indicate when the personal pronoun "I" is meant. This lettering convention can be seen in computer fonts designed for comic book lettering, which use OpenType contextual alternates to replace the single-stroke "I" with a serifed one in appropriate contexts.

In some comics, characters who are upside down when speaking also have the lettering in their speech bubbles turned upside down. As this only hinders the reading of the comic, this seems to be used only for humorous effect.

== See also ==
- Balloon help
- Cartouche – an oval design, often with text inside.
- Image macro
- The Bubble Project
- Pop-Up Video, a television show where pop-up "bubbles" appear on the music video giving additional information
