= The Glasgow Looking Glass =

19th-century British magazine

Publication information
- Publication date: 11 June 1825 – 3 April 1826

The Glasgow Looking Glass was the first mass-produced publication to tell stories using illustrations, and as such is regarded as the earliest comics magazine. The final issue was published on 3 April 1826.

== Publishing history ==
The title was published by Glasgow lithographic printer John Watson and its principal strip illustrator was William Heath. The fourth issue contained History of a Coat, its first comic strip. After the fifth issue, the title was changed to The Northern Looking Glass to reflect broader Scottish concerns.

== Format ==
The fortnightly publication provided satirical snapshots of Glasgow society, British culture and 19th-century fashions. Innovations included use of the term "To be continued" and word balloons.
