= Ji Lee =

Ji Lee is a Korean-American business executive and designer. He is Executive Vice President of the Global Marketing Center at Samsung Electronics in Korea and former Creative Director at Facebook, Google, and the advertising agency Droga5. Lee's wide range of works covers the fields of advertising, graphic design, marketing, product design, street art, animation, installation, and video. Lee is known for his personal projects such as the Bubble Project, Word as Image, and Drawings for My Grandchildren, and has been giving public speeches on the “Power of Personal Projects.”

Lee was named one of America's 50 most influential designers by Fast Company in 2011. Lee’s work has appeared in the New York Times, BBC, ABC News, The Guardian, and Wired. Lee is the author of four books.

== Early life ==
Lee was born in Seoul, South Korea, in 1971. He moved to Brazil when he was 10 and later moved to New York City to study at Parsons School of Design. He ended up graduating with a degree in communication and graphic design.

== Bubble Project ==
Among the works of public art he is known for is the Bubble Project: Lee printed 50,000 stickers that look like speech bubbles used in comic strips. He then posted these blank speech bubbles on top of advertisements throughout New York City, allowing anyone who sees them to write in their comments and thoughts. In 2006, Lee wrote a book about the project called Talk Back: The Bubble Project, which talks about the blank bubbles which transformed the corporate monologue into a true public dialogue.

== Mysterabbit ==
Lee was also the founders of the project Mysterabbit where a small white coloured rabbit was placed anonymously in over 19 different countries around the world. The rabbit is 3D Printable and there are photos available on their Mysterabbit website.

== Redundant Clock ==
In 2015, Lee started a crowdfunding project on Kickstarter, called “Redundant Clock”, which was successfully funded. In 2019, Lee collaborated with Hong Kong independent watchmaker Anicorn Watches to make “Redundant Watch”, which was also a crowdfunding project on Kickstarter.
