= The Bubble Project =

Anti-advertising public art campaign

The Bubble Project, as proclaimed by its manifesto, aims to counteract corporate marketing and advertisement messages in public spaces.

The project was conceived by Ji Lee, an artist and art director who originally printed 15,000 stickers that look like speech bubbles used in comic strips. He posts these blank speech bubbles on top of advertisements throughout New York City, allowing anyone who sees them to write in their comments and thoughts. By filling in the bubbles people engage in the project and transform "the corporate monologue into an open dialogue".

The Bubble Project quickly gained popularity and independent efforts have sprung up in other parts of the world in countries such as Italy or Argentina.

On June 1, 2006, a book written by Lee was released. It explains the whole idea behind the project and shows the best pictures taken in the first 4 years, showing the results of the project.

== See also ==
- Culture jamming

== External websites ==
- Ji Lee (2006). Talk Back: The Bubble Project. Mark Batty Publisher. ISBN 0-9762245-7-7.
- Wortham, Jenna (23 April 2008). "Behind the Memes: Ji Lee, Bubble Project Media Jammer". Wired.
- Yoo, Alice (13 February 2009). "The Bubble Project, What are You Thinking? (16 Pics)". My Modern Met.
