= Burking Poor Old Mrs Constitution =

1829 editorial cartoon

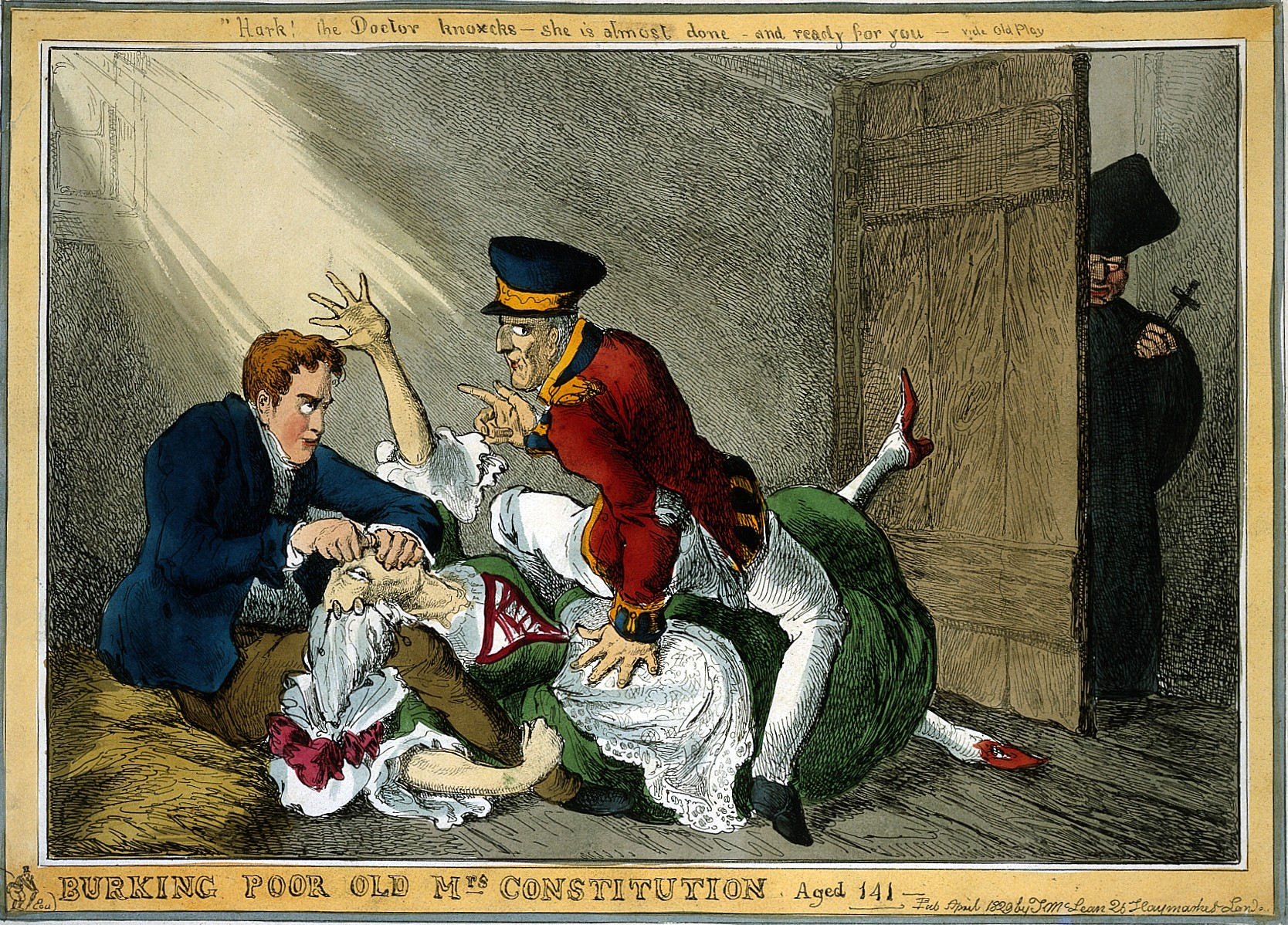
- Artist: William Heath
- Year: April 1829
- Type: Hand-colored etching
- Dimensions: 26.4 cm × 36.9 cm (10.4 in × 14.5 in)

Burking Poor Old Mrs Constitution is an 1829 satirical cartoon by the British illustrator William Heath. An attack on the Catholic Emancipation measures brought in by the Duke of Wellington's Tory Government, it portrays this as a murder act equivalent to those committed by the notorious killers Burke and Hare over a period of ten months in 1828 in Edinburgh, Scotland. Wellington and his henchman Robert Peel are shown suffocating "Old Mrs Constitution", aged 141 years (a reference to the Glorious Revolution of 1688). With the defeat of the supremacy of the Church of England, a Roman Catholic priest is shown entering the door to purchase the corpse.

Copies exist today in the British Museum and National Portrait Gallery in London and the Philadelphia Museum of Art in Pennsylvania.

== Bibliography ==
- Harris, Enriqueta. Spanish Art in Britain and Ireland, 1750-1920: Studies in Reception in Memory of Enriqueta Harris Frankfort. Tamesis Books, 2010.
- Muir, Rory. Wellington: Waterloo and the Fortunes of Peace 1814–1852. Yale University Press, 2015.
