= William Heath (artist) =

English artist (1795–1840)

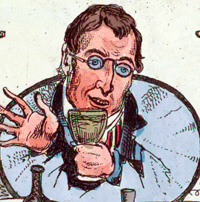
- A vignette incorporating a self-portrait by William Heath. (in Volume 1, No. 14, "The Northern Looking Glass", January 9, 1826, p. 50).
- Born: 1795; Northumberland, England
- Died: 7 April 1840 (aged 44–45); Hampstead, London, England
- Occupations: Portrait and military painter

William Heath (1795 – 7 April 1840) was an English artist who once described himself as a "portrait & military painter." He was best known for his published engravings which included caricatures, political cartoons, and commentary on contemporary life.

== Biography ==
Heath was born in Northumberland, England. His early works often dealt with military scenes, including colour plates for The Martial Achievements, The Wars of Wellington, etc., but from about 1820 on he focused on satire.

Between 1827 and 1829, many of his works were published under the pseudonym "Paul Pry" (the name of an overly inquisitive stage character in a popular 1825 stage comedy by John Poole); also used the pseudonym Argus. He was described by Dr John Brown, biographer of John Leech as "poor Heath, the ex-Captain of Dragoons, facile and profuse, unscrupulous and clever".

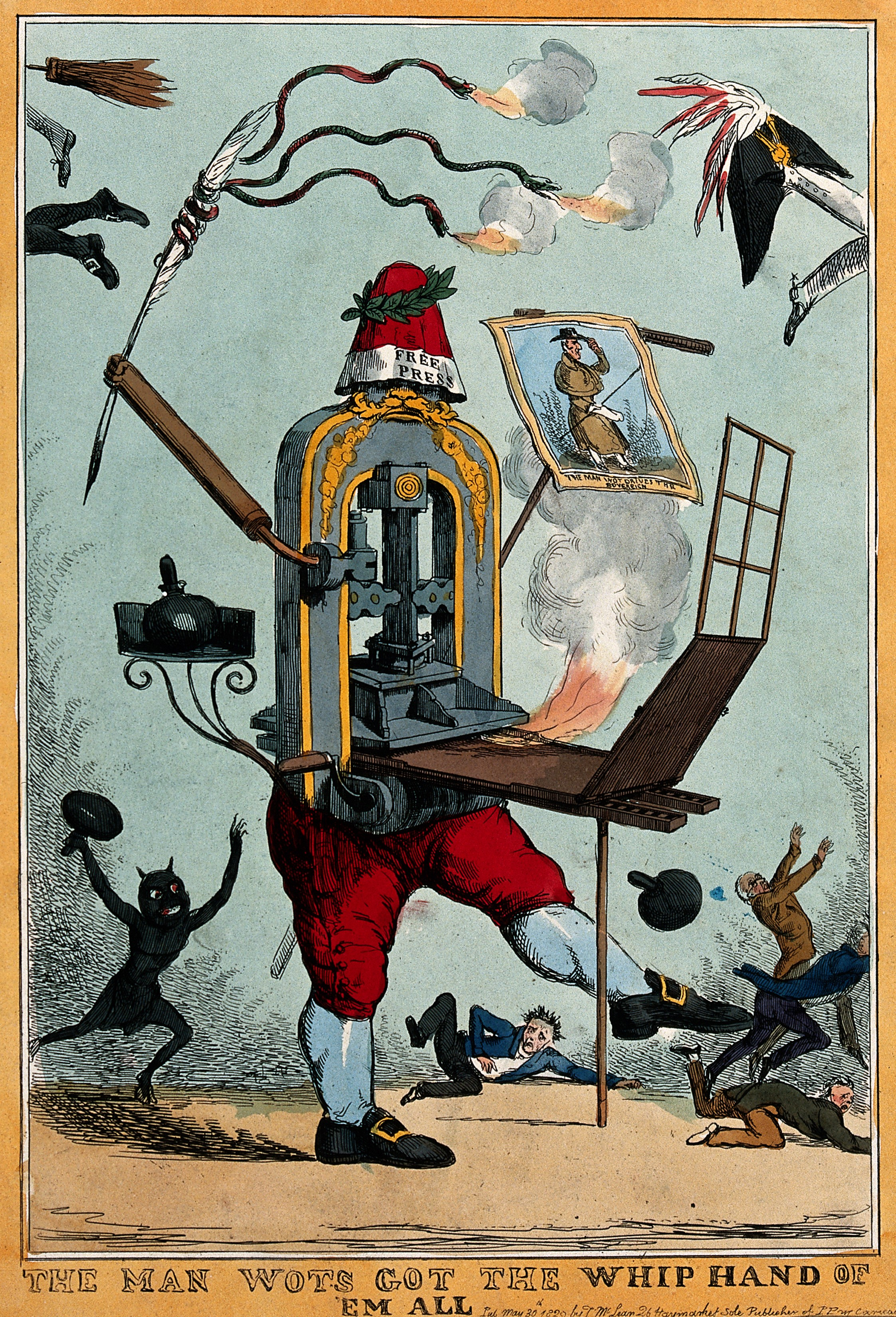
A printing press with a pair of legs brandishes a quill wrap, by William Heath as Paul Pry

Heath helped found an early caricature magazine, The Glasgow Looking Glass (renamed to The Northern Looking Glass after five issues). Heath created a numbered series of political caricatures between 1830 and 1834 for McLean's Monthly.

== Death and legacy ==
He died in Hampstead and was buried on the western side of Highgate Cemetery. His grave (no.124) no longer has a headstone or any identifying marker. The British Museum catalogue has over 160 works by Heath.

== Gallery ==
=== Caricatures ===
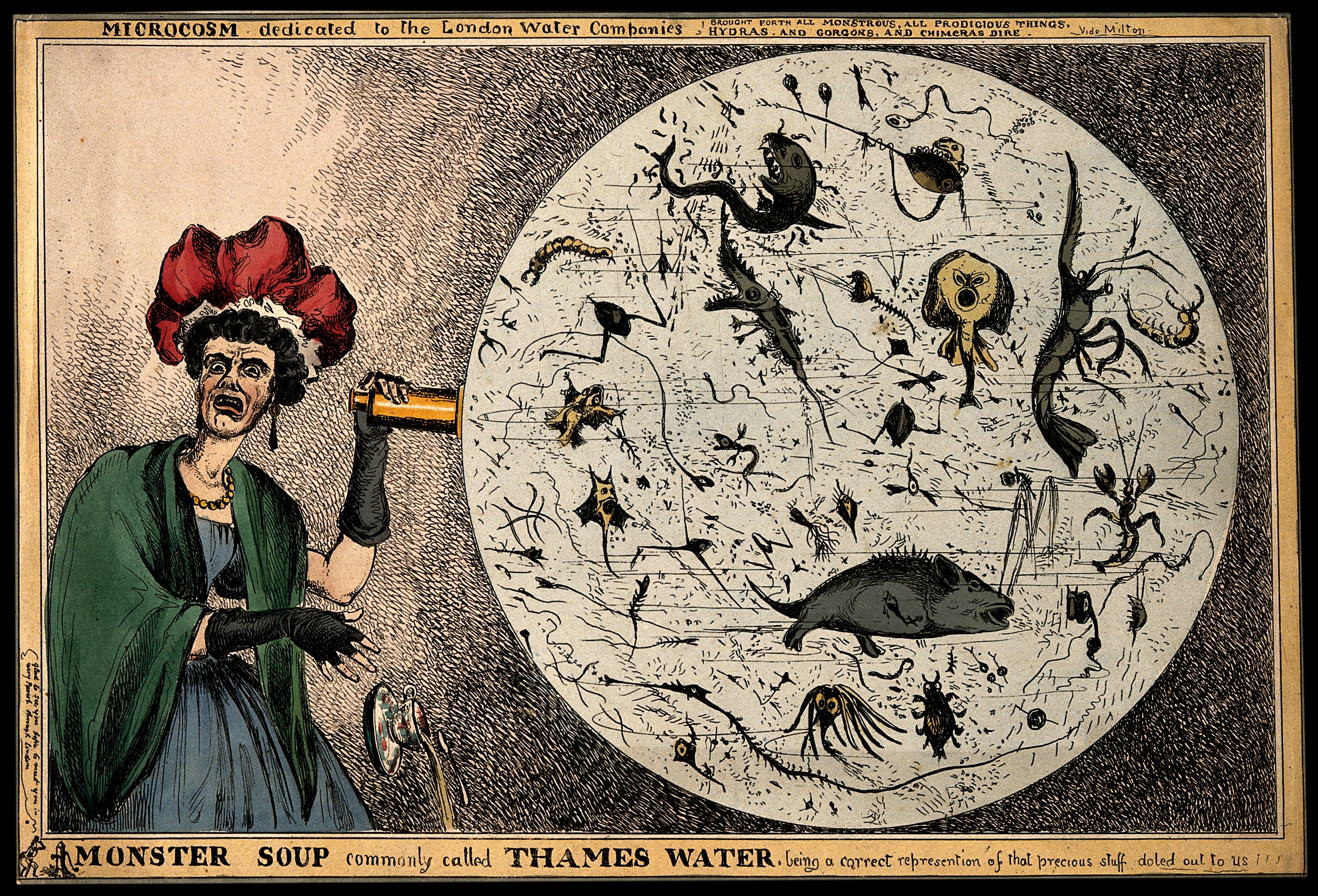
Monster soup

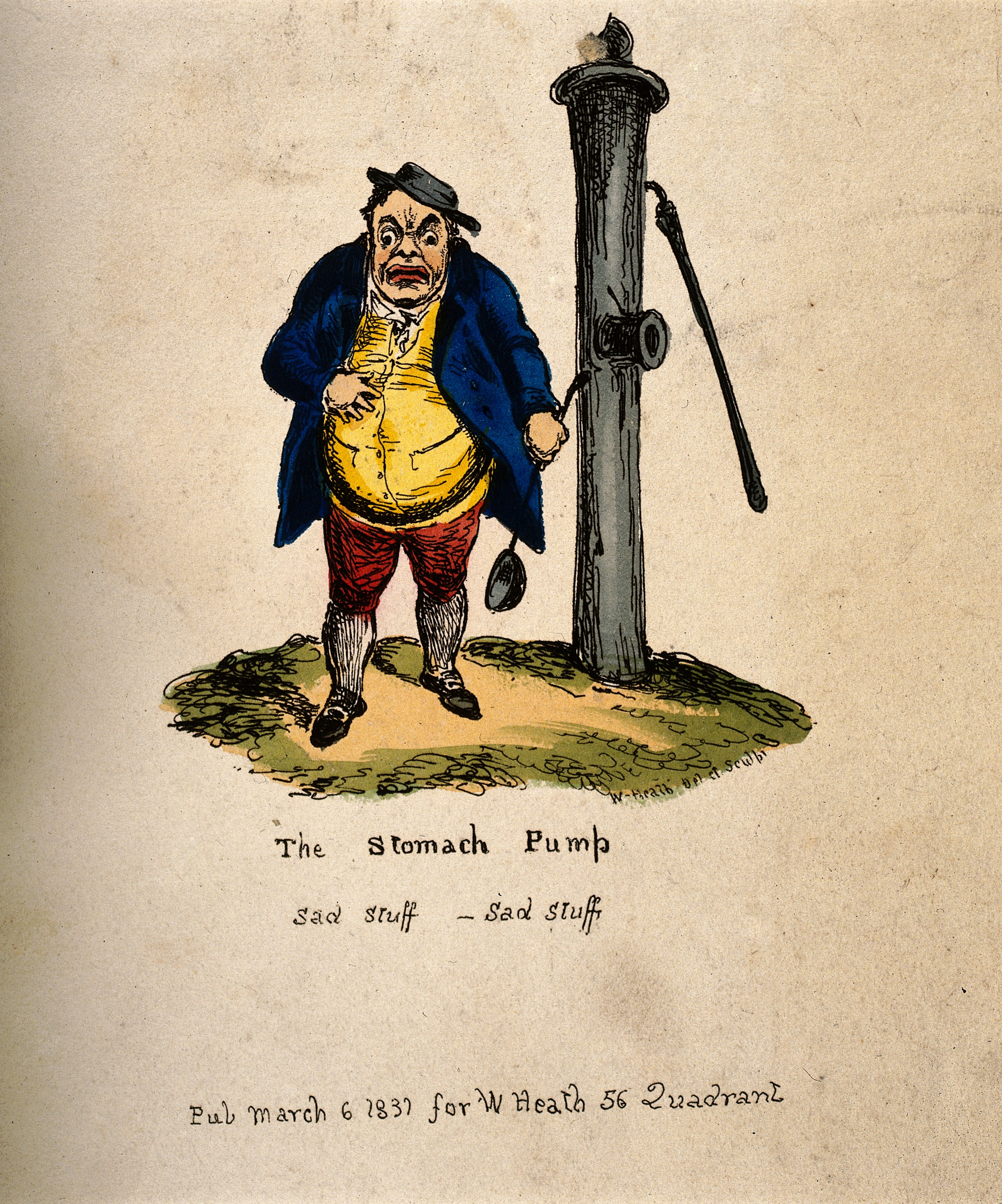
The Stomach Pump

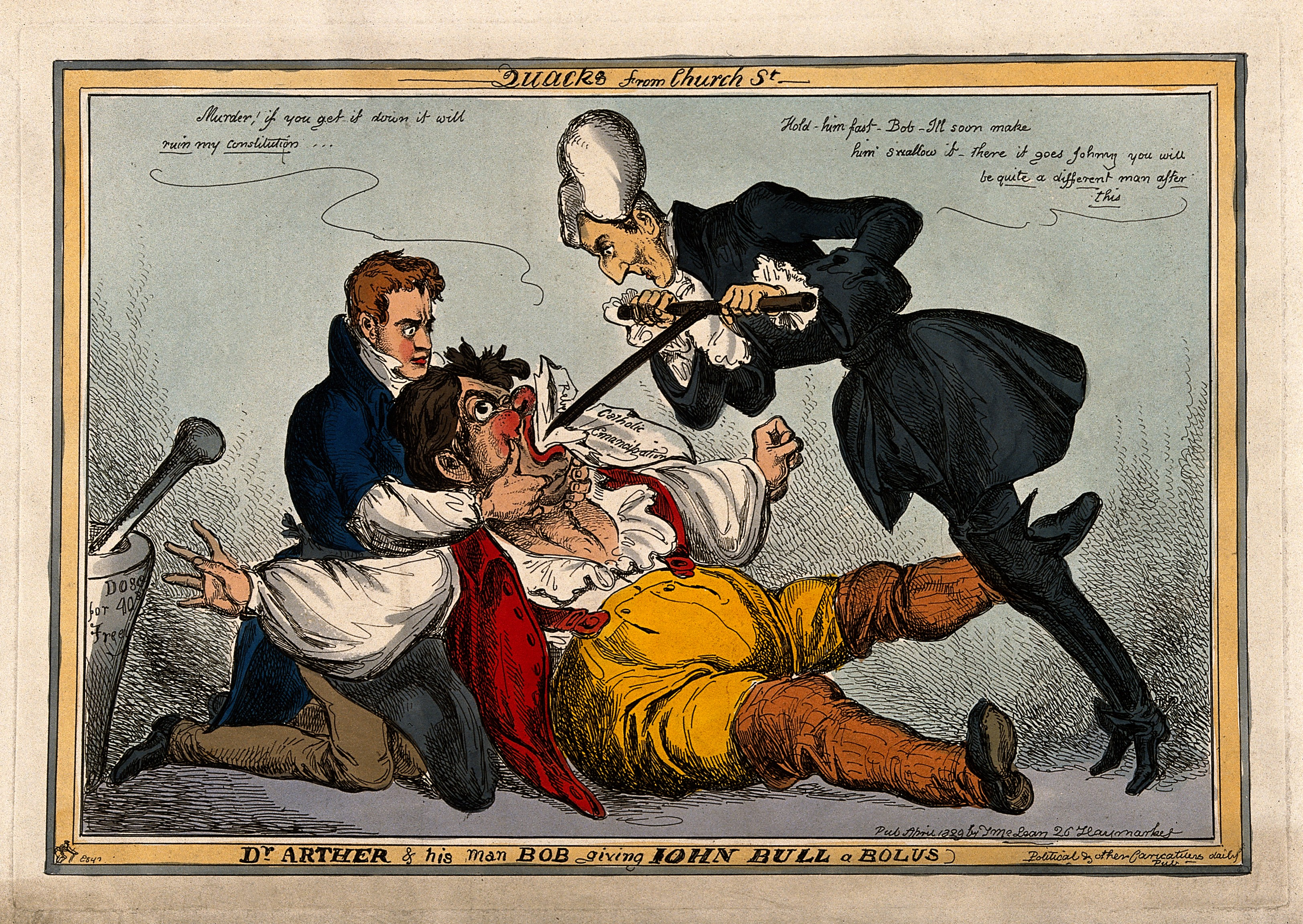
Dr Arthur and his man Bob giving John Bull a Bolus, 1829

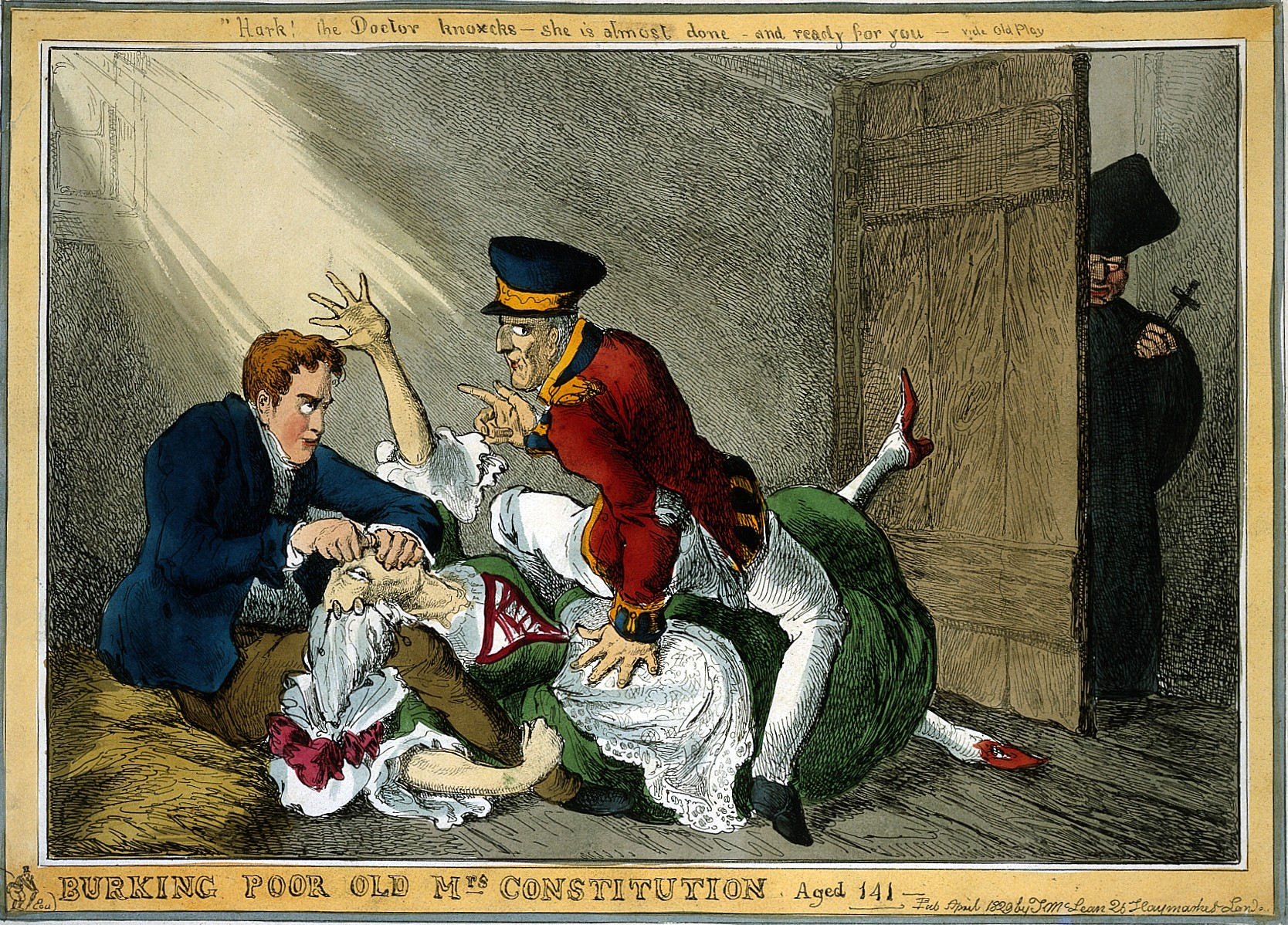
Burking Poor Old Mrs Constitution, 1829

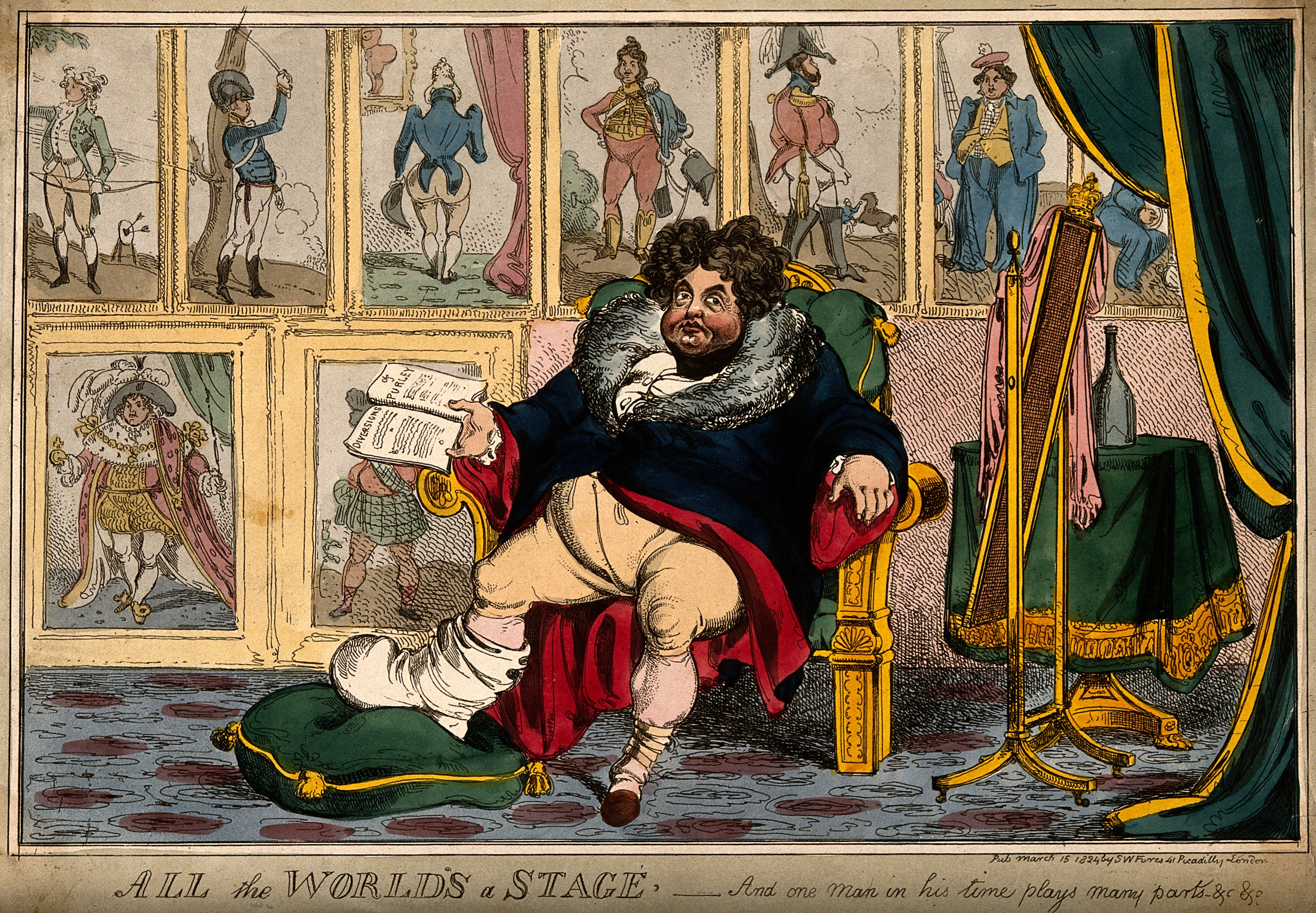
All the World's a Stage, 1824

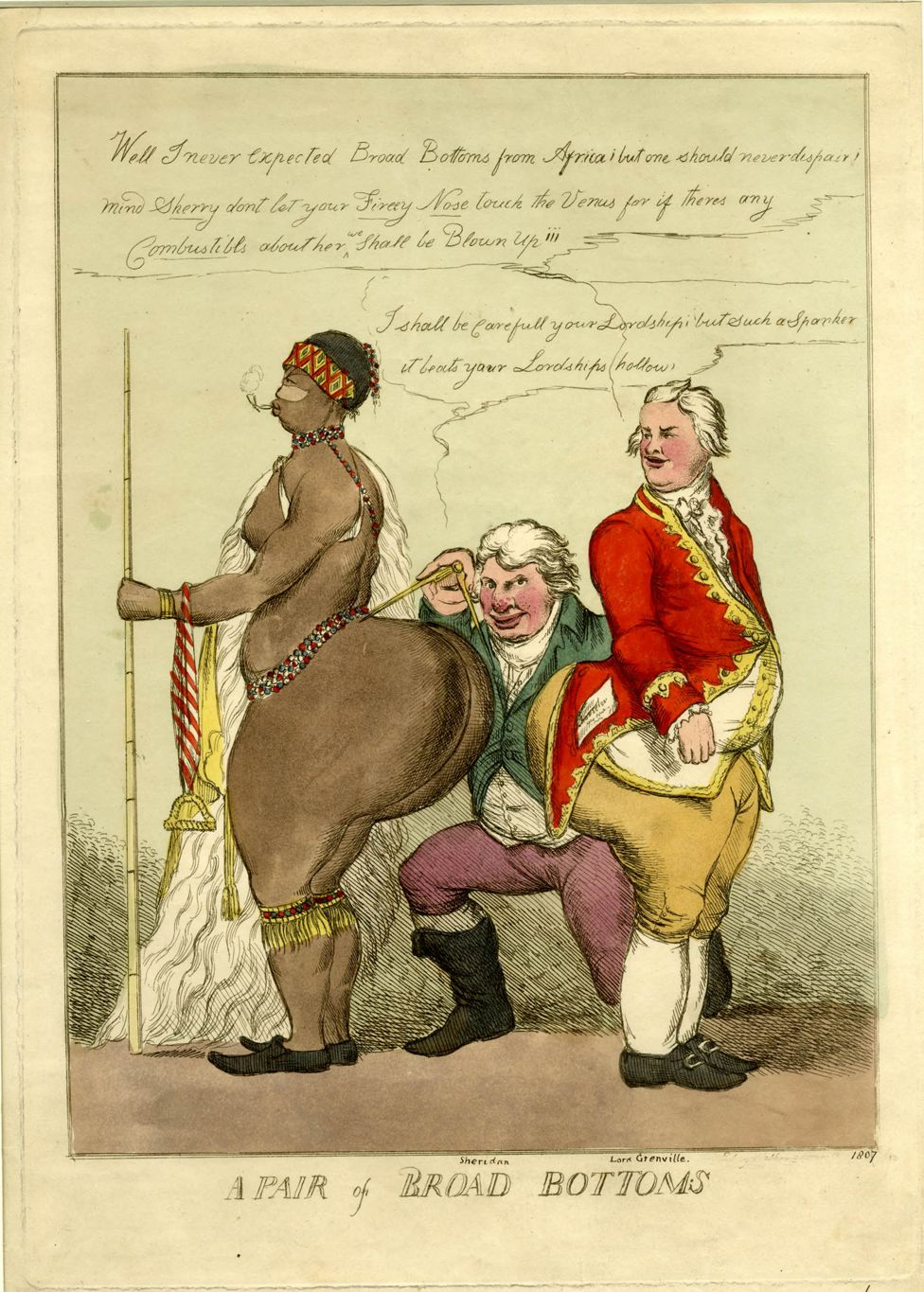
A Pair of Broad Bottoms, 1810

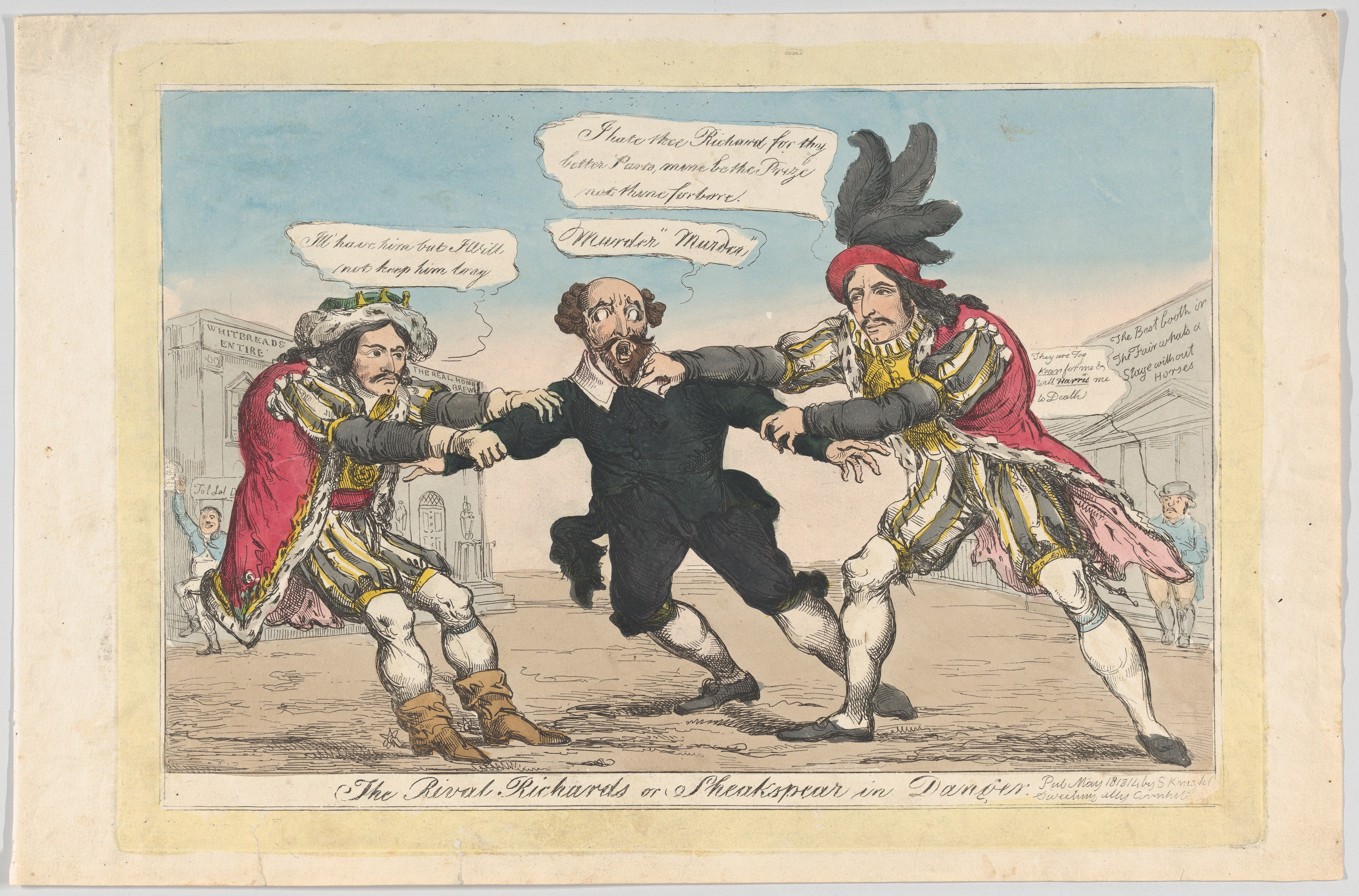
The Rival Richards, 1814

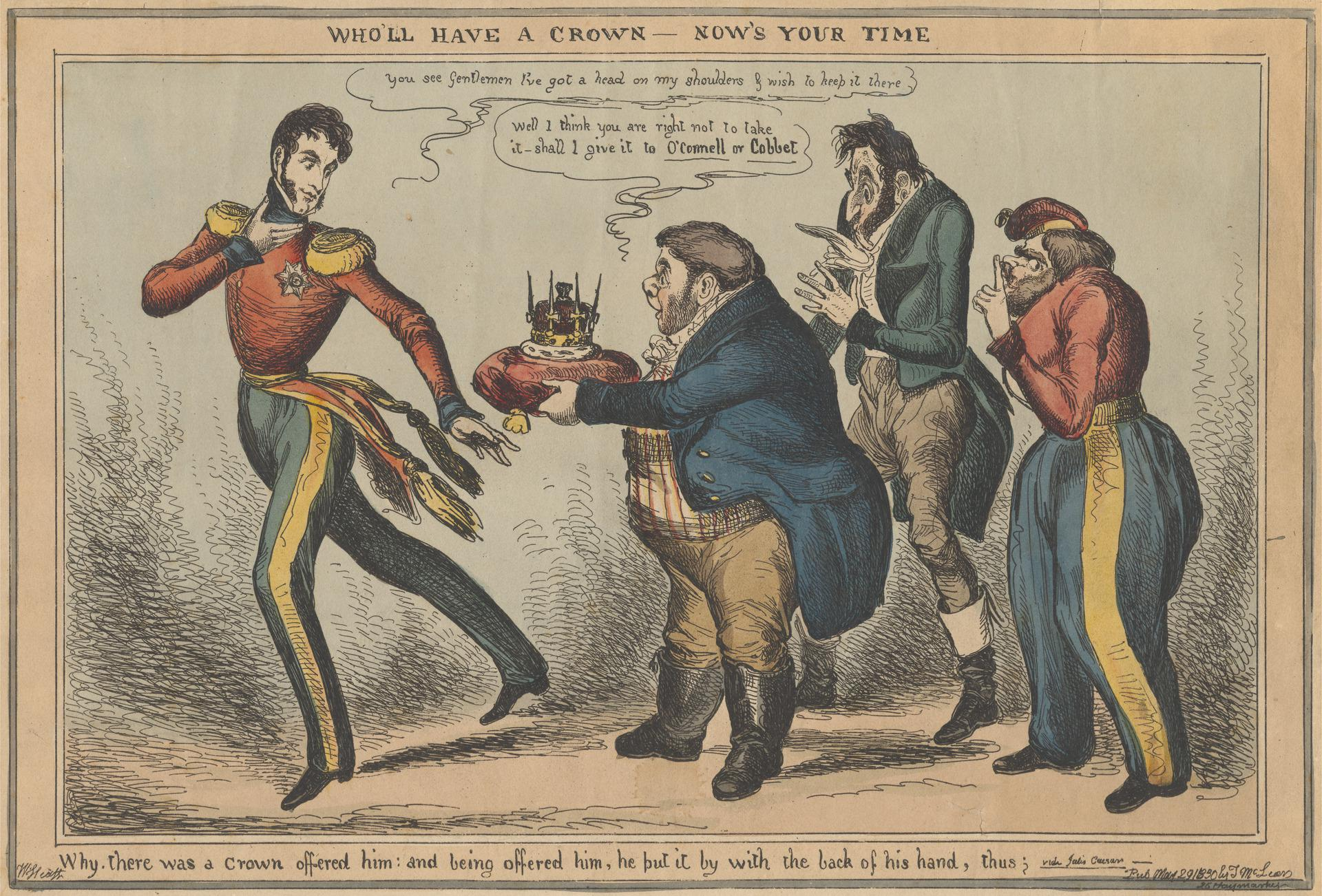
Prince Leopold turning down the Greek crown, 1830

=== Military scenes ===
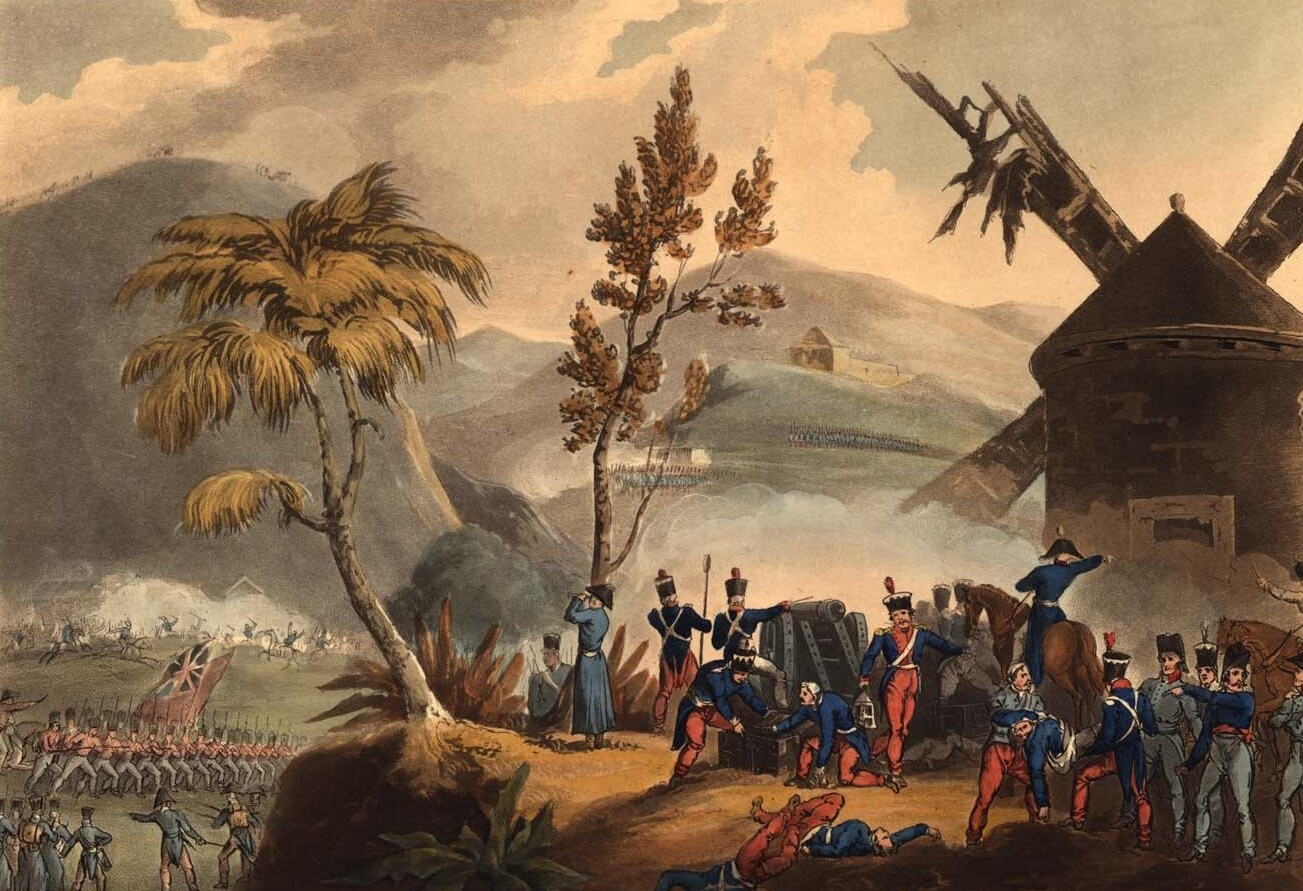
Battle of Rolica

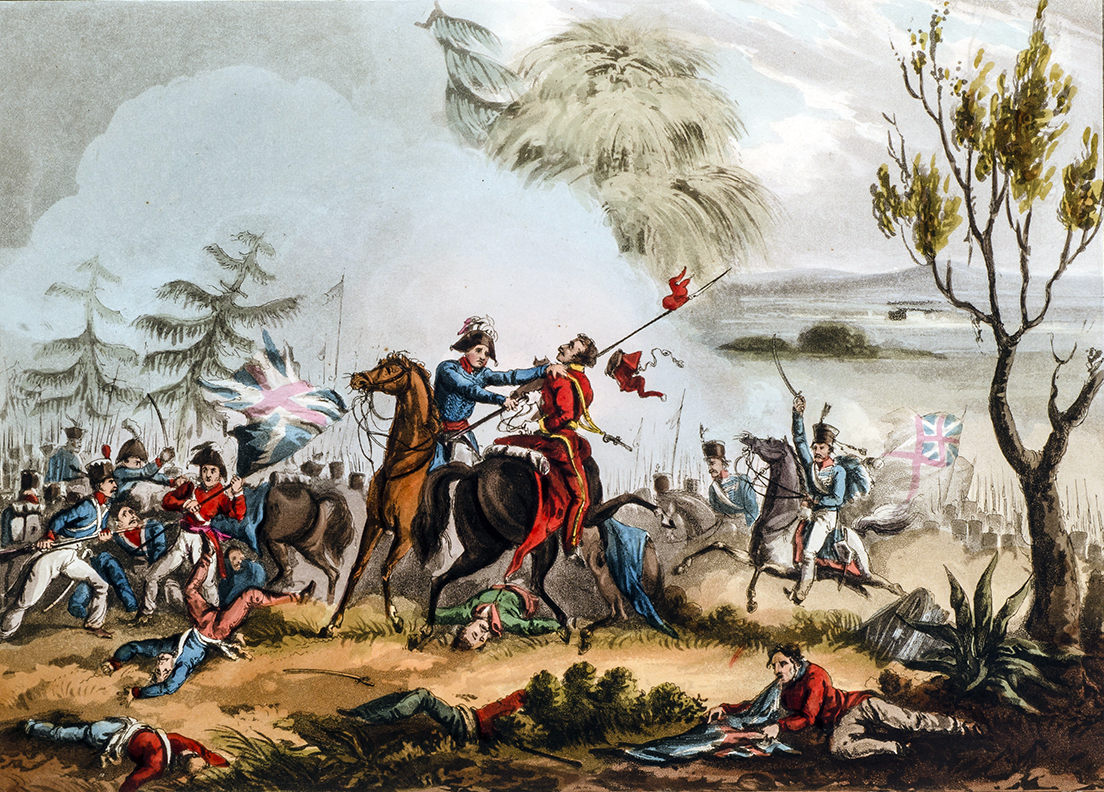
Battle of Albuera

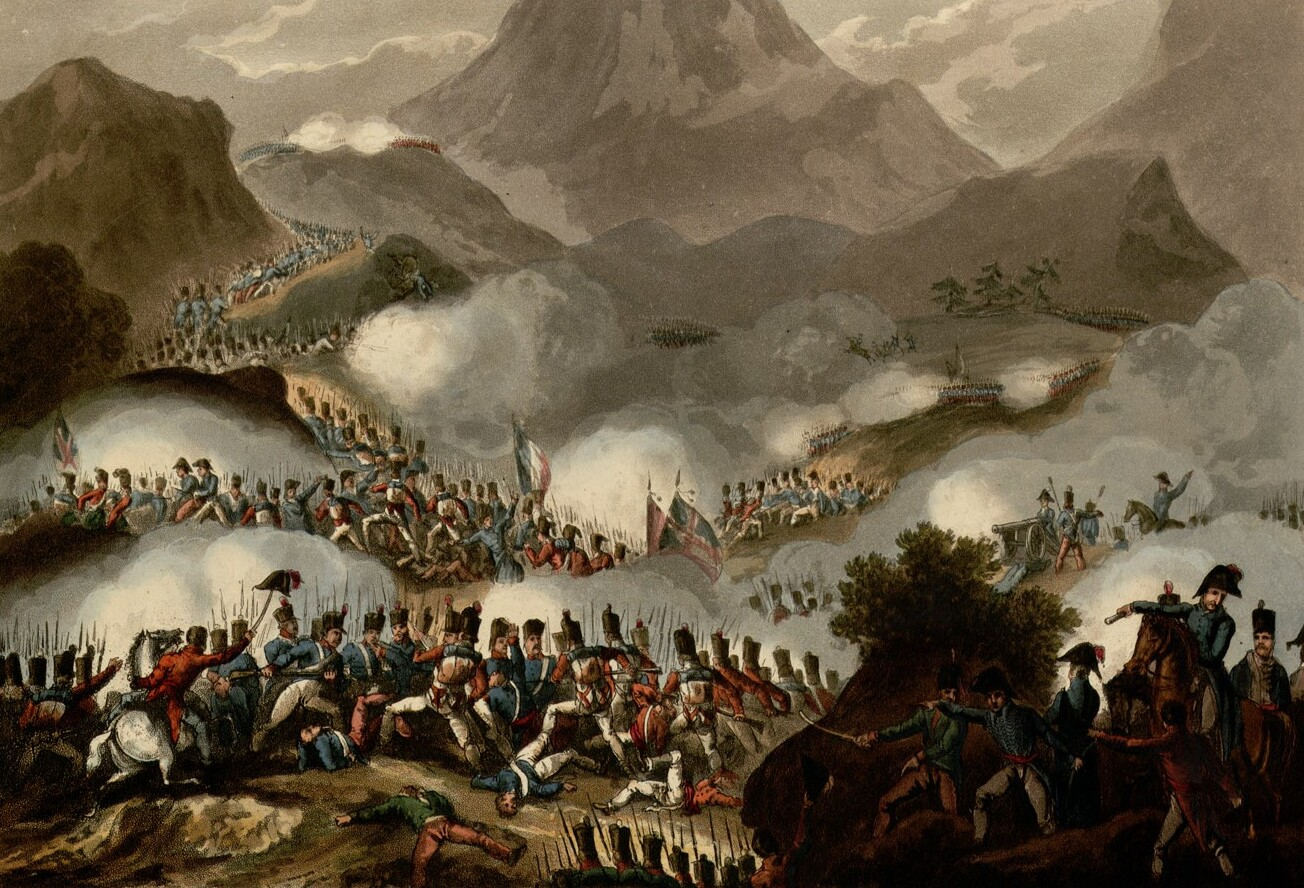
Battle of the Pyrenees

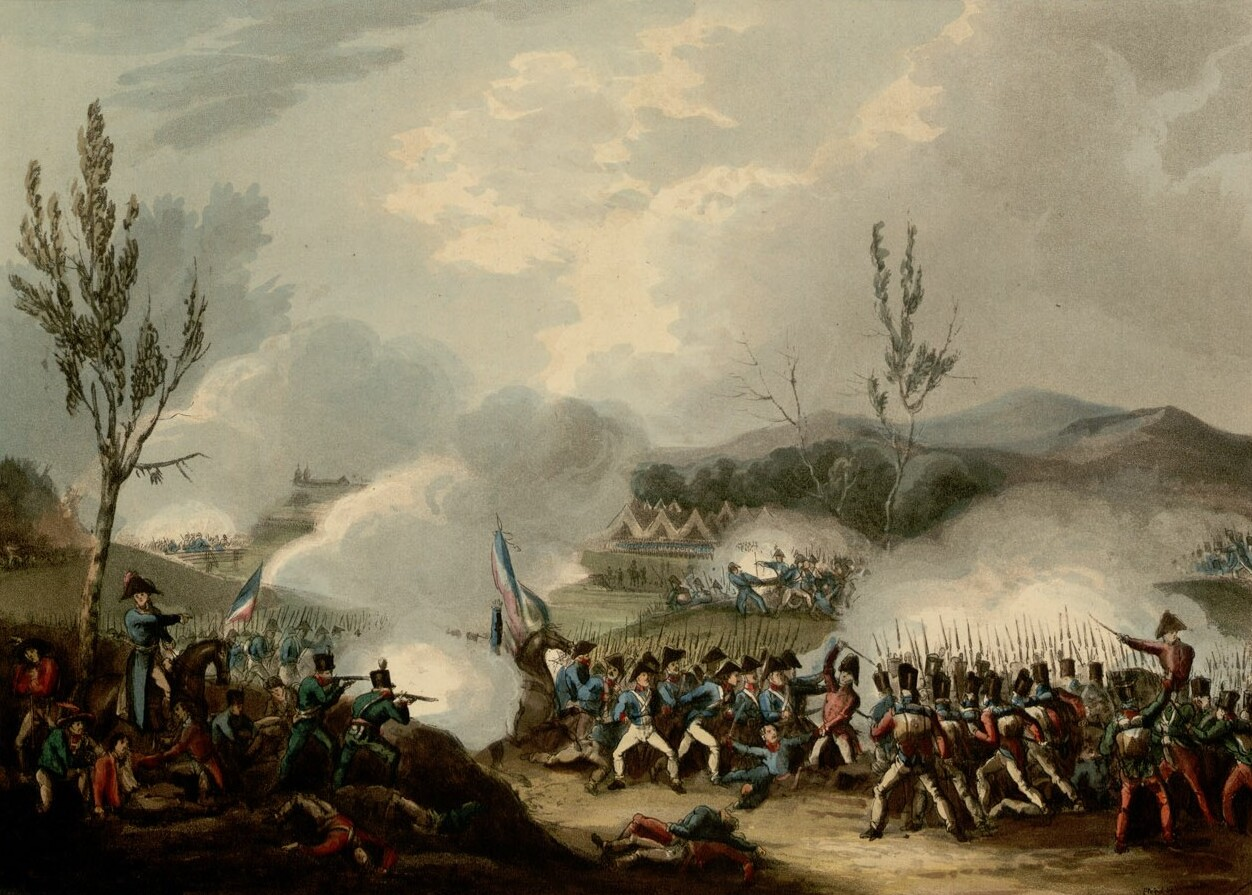
Attack on the Road to Bayonne

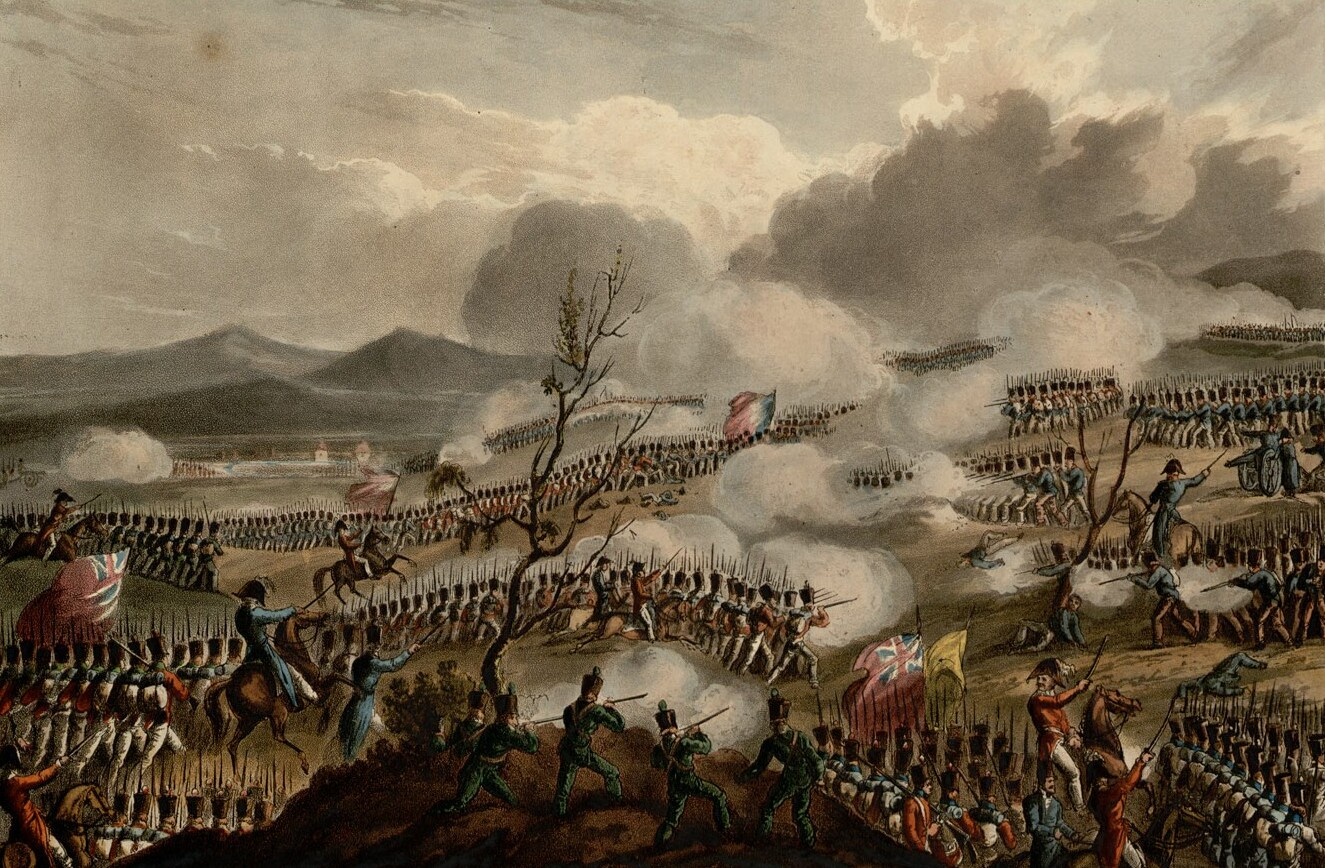
Battle of Nivelle

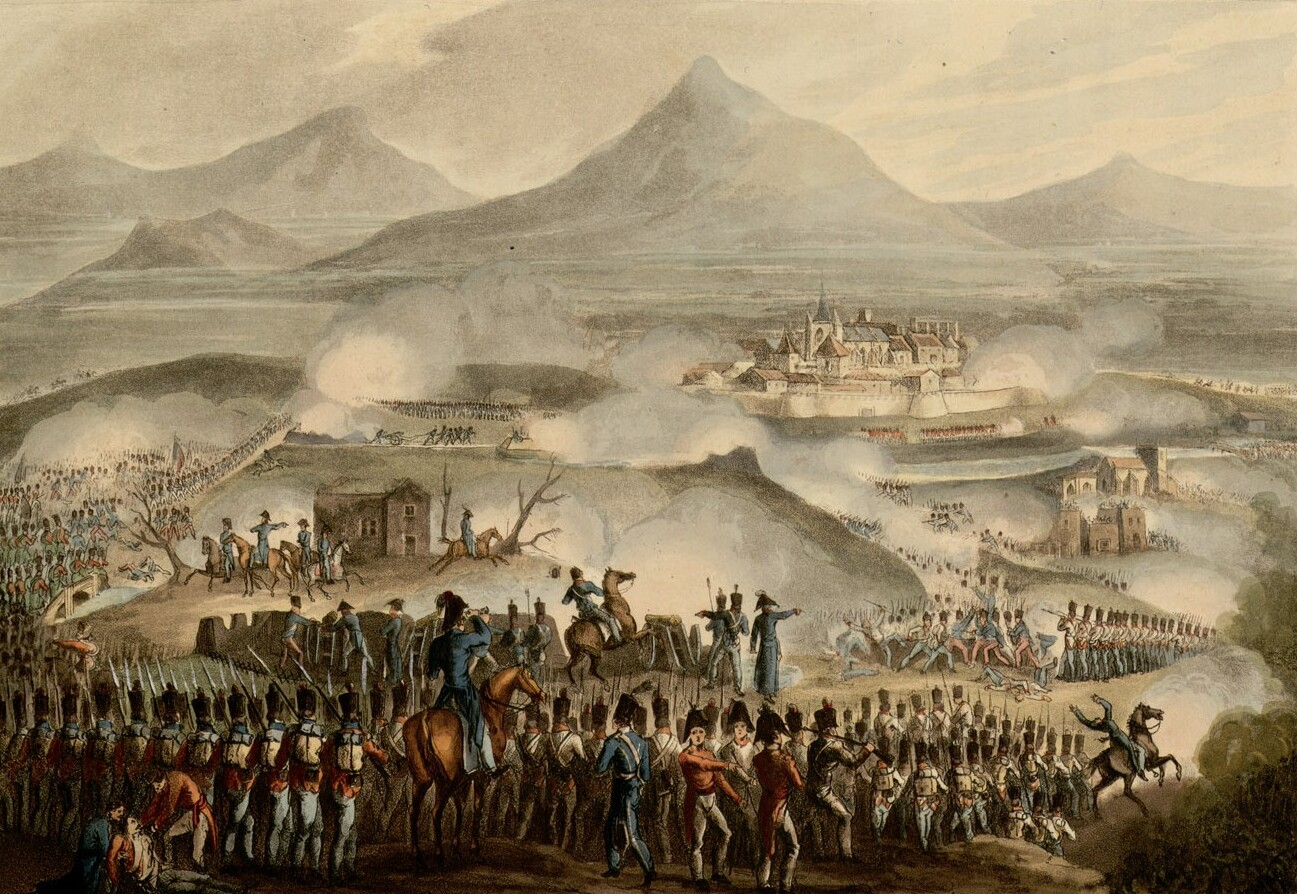
Battle of Toulouse

== Works ==
- Historical Military and Naval Anecdotes (1815)
- The Martial Achievements of Great Britain and her Allies (1815)
- The Wars of Wellington (1819) (Illustrations)
- Real Life in Ireland (1821) (Illustrations)
- Real Life in London (1822) (Illustrations)
- The Life of a Soldier (1823)
- Studies from the Stage (1823)
- Rustic Sketches (1824)
- Illustrations of Heraldry (1828)
- Parish Characters (1829)
- Sayings of the Ancients (1831)
- Fashion and Folly (1832)
- Minor Morals for Young People. Illustrated in tales and travels (1834–39).
