= Brandalism =

UK activist artist collective (2012-)

- Formation: 2012
- Location: Australia, Paris, United Kingdom
- Key people: Paul Insect, Ron English, Robert Montgomery
- Website: brandalism.ch

Brandalism (a portmanteau of 'brand' and 'vandalism') is an activist artist collective founded in 2012 in the United Kingdom which engages in subvertising, culture jamming, and protest art. Brandalism uses subvertising to alter and critique corporate advertising by creating parodies or spoofs to replace ads in public areas. The art is typically intended to draw attention to political and social issues such as consumerism and the environment. Advertisements produced by the Brandalism movement are silk screen printed artworks, and may take the form of a new image, or a satirical alteration to an existing image, icon or logo. The advertisements are often pasted over billboards, or propped under the glass of roadside advertising spaces.

Prior to the formal emergence of Brandalism, similar creative activist movements had existed, using culture jamming, subvertising and détournement to promote a range of social and political issues throughout history. In 2012, during the Summer Olympics hosted in the UK, the Brandalism movement officially emerged. Since then, several public Brandalism campaigns have been launched across the globe. These include during the 2015 United Nations Climate Change Conference in Paris and the 2019-2020 Australian bushfire season, where the Brandalism movement sought to draw attention to topics such as environmental degradation, visual pollution, debt and the representation of body image in advertising.

== History and notable instances ==
Brandalism is a movement that practices ‘culture jamming’ – a campaigning technique that uses mass-marketing tools subversively to criticise consumerism, advertising and mass media. It draws inspiration from ‘détournement’, a technique used during the 1950s by the Situationist International, an international organisation of avant-garde artists. Détournement is a French term that refers to the reappropriation of forms of popular culture to challenge and reveal hidden meanings within these forms. It has also been defined as the practice of “turning expressions of the capitalist system and its media culture against itself”. During the 1970s, this technique was used by the Australian Billboard Utilising Graffitists Against Unhealthy Promotions (BUGAUP), who altered tobacco and alcohol advertising billboards in a campaign to rebel against the promotion of unhealthy substance consumption. Between 2000 and 2004 Greenpeace pressured Coca Cola to abandon the use of hydroflurocarbons by placing stickers and posters on Coca-Cola products and refrigerators and vending machines. These parodied the company's then signature images of polar bears, but had them floating on melting icebergs and used the corporation's calligraphy for wording such as “Enjoy Climate Change. The movement was officially labelled ‘Brandalism’ during the 2012 Summer Olympics in London, when a group of artists replaced corporate advertisements on billboards with satirical posters critiquing consumerism and advertising. Following this, the Brandalism network expanded and large projects emerged during the 2015 UN Climate Change Conference in Paris and the 2020 bushfire season in Australia.

=== 2012 Summer Olympics, London (UK) ===
The first major Brandalism project occurred during the UK summer Olympics in July 2012. Over a five-day period, a team of 28 artists installed satirical parodies of corporate advertisements over 36 large format billboards in Leeds, Manchester, Birmingham, Bristol and London. The project was titled ’48 sheet’ and sought to comment on the impacts of advertising on culture and community, specifically targeting the “brand mania” surrounding the London Olympic games. Artists involved in the project included post-situationist artist Robert Montgomery (artist), pop artist Ron English and Banksy collaborator Paul Insect. The works appropriated advertisements from brands such as Foot Locker, McDonald's, JD Sport and Nike. The project gained international media attention, provoking widespread public discussions about the legitimacy of corporate advertising. After this, the Brandalism network began to develop and expand, with installations popping up in Glasgow, Edinburgh, Liverpool, Oxford and Brighton.

=== 2015 UN Climate Change Conference, Paris (France) ===
The 2015 UN Climate Change Conference was held in Paris, France from the 30th of November to the 12th of December 2015. During the conference, attending parties negotiated the Paris Agreement, an international commitment to reducing carbon emissions and combatting climate change. During the Conference, Brandalism activists posted 600 pieces of satirical artwork in bus stop advertising spaces across Paris. The art was designed by 82 artists from 19 countries. The art sought to protest against what Brandalism activists called the “greenwashing” of the UN Climate Change talks, and “the links between advertising, consumerism, fossil fuel dependency and climate change". Across Paris, Brandalism activists covered over posters from JC Decaux, an outdoor advertising multi-national corporation and major sponsor of the climate conference. Many of the posters distributed were parodies targeting other companies who were sponsoring the COP21, including Air France and Volkswagen. Other posters satirically depicted world leaders of the time, calling on them to take action on climate change and other environmental issues. 44th President of the United States Barack Obama, 24th President of France François Hollande, then-Prime Minister of the United Kingdom David Cameron and chancellor of Germany Angela Merkel were among the political figures displayed.

=== 2019-2020 bushfires, Australia ===
During the 2019–20 Australian bushfire season, intense bushfires occurred across Australia. 33 people died in the fires, 12.6 million hectares of land were burnt, 434 million tonnes of CO_{2} were emitted and over 1 billion animals were killed. In response to the bushfires, a group of 41 artists collaborated on a Brandalism project dubbed "Bushfire Brandalism". 78 roadside advertisements were replaced with satirical posters across Sydney, Melbourne and Brisbane. Each poster featured a call to action and a QR code to the charity of each artist's choice. The posters sought to draw awareness to the underlying causes of the bushfires, focussing on a range of subjects including climate change, drought, the fossil fuel industry, the Australian Federal government's response to the bushfire season and damage to Australia's native flora and fauna. The posters depicted popular Australian iconography as well as major political figures, such as Australian Prime Minister Scott Morrison.

=== 2020 Anti-HSBC Campaign, United Kingdom ===
In November 2020, Brandalism activists covered more than 250 billboards and bus stop advertising spaces across 10 cities in the United Kingdom with satirical advertisements targeting HSBC, a British multinational investment bank. This Brandalism project emerged in response to HSBC's announcement that it would aim to reduce its carbon emissions to zero by 2050, with activists claiming that this target was inadequate. Brandalism campaigners produced satirical advertisements accusing HSBC of “climate colonialism” and protesting against its investment in fossil fuels, links to deforestation and alleged involvement in human rights abuses.

== Politics ==
The Brandalism movement is a form of grassroots campaigning that seeks to evoke change and promote awareness about various political issues through creative activism. On its website, the movement describes itself as a “revolt against the corporate control of culture and space". By intervening in public advertising spaces, the Brandalism movement seeks to challenge the power of large corporations and their role in climate change. In the Brandalism manifesto, it is stated that the purpose of the movement is to “speak truth to power, to oppression, to injustice” and to “reclaim the space to express". Brandalism specifically focuses on the relationship between advertising, consumerism and the environment, seeking to challenge the use of corporate advertising in public spaces. Brandalism projects have historically been launched during (or in response to) large events with significant political causes or consequences. The satirical advertisements produced by the Brandalism movement typically target large corporations or influential political actors, seeking to address contemporary political and social issues. Common ideological themes of Brandalism advertisements include progressivism, anti-capitalism, anti-consumerism and environmentalism.

== Techniques ==
The Brandalism movement appropriates corporate advertisements and installs satirical adaptations of these advertisements in public spaces. Brandalism artists use a range of artistic techniques in the creation of their artworks to create meaning and express criticism of consumerism and corporate advertising. In the distribution of these subverted advertisements, Brandalism artists often follow a strict method so as to circumvent legal punishment.

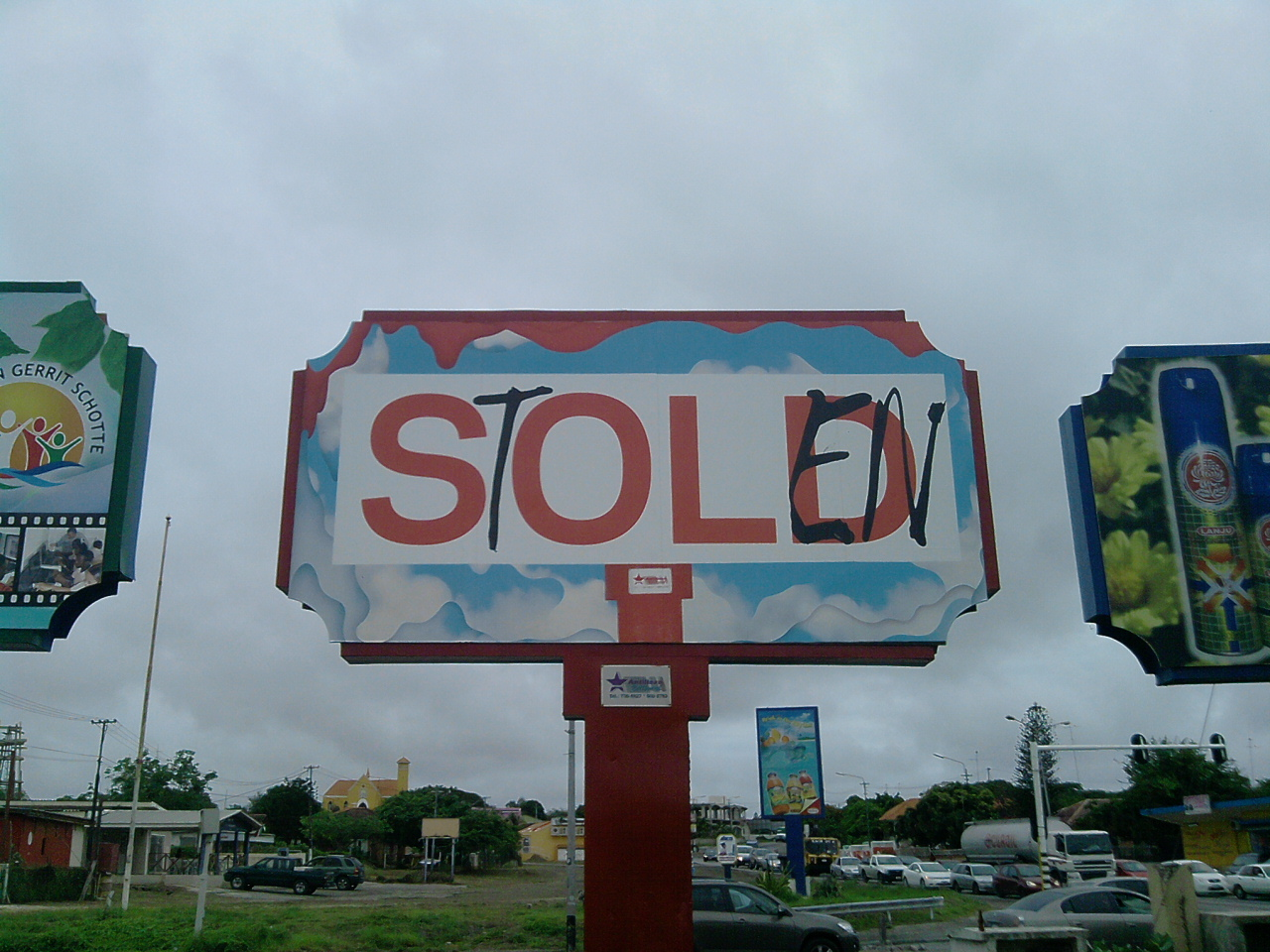
Hand-painted subverted advertisement

=== Artistic techniques ===
The artistic techniques and forms used by Brandalism artists are often dependent on the resources available to them or the resources they can borrow from nearby artists. Some Brandalism artists hand draw or paint over advertisements in public spaces. Others use software such as Adobe Photoshop to create their artworks digitally, and then print them using large format digital printers or screen printers. The standard size of a Brandalism artwork is 120 by 180 cm (47 by 71 in), as this is the average display size of bus stop advertising spaces.

=== Methods ===
Brandalism involves activities that are considered illegal in many parts of the world. As such, artists from the Brandalism movement often follow a strict method to avoid legal penalty or sanction for the distribution of their subverted advertisements. Brandalism artists usually work individually or in small groups, and connect with one another using social media application such as Instagram or Facebook. In order to install their satirical adaptions of advertisements, Brandalism artists sometimes create their own high visibility vests with fake brand labels of large outdoor advertising companies such as JCDecaux and Clear Channel Outdoor printed onto them. This way, they can operate in plain sight and avoid drawing attention to themselves. They typically use 4-way utility, H60 or T30 keys to open locks and gain access to bus stop advertising spaces. After gaining access to the space, they remove existing advertisements and replace these with their subverted and satirical advertisements or paintings.

== Brandalism and the law ==
The Brandalism movement has a complex relationship with the law. Whilst never tested in court, some brand owners have threatened to pursue legal action against the distributors of subverted corporate advertisements on the grounds of alleged copyright infringement, trade mark infringement and injurious falsehood. Other critics of Brandalism have claimed that it constitutes a criminal act, involving vandalism and trespassing. In response, artists have cited defences related to individual rights of freedom of speech and expression, which are often considered to prevail over the intellectual property rights of brand owners.

=== Copyright and trade mark infringements ===
Brandalism involves the satirical adaptation of corporate advertisements for the purpose of criticising corporations and the presence of corporate advertising in public spaces. In many cases, the subverted advertisements distributed by Brandalism artists are deliberately intended to look similar to the original advertisement. Some brand owners have consequently claimed that some instances of Brandalism may violate copyright or trademark laws. Defences used in response to claims of copyright or trademark infringement include fair dealing and rights to freedom of expression. In the United Kingdom and Australia, the Copyright Designs and Patents Act 1988 permits the fair dealing of copyrighted material for the purpose of parody, satire, criticism or review. Section 10 of the Trade Marks Act 1994 also implies that infringements of trade mark may be defendable if 'due cause' can be established. This could occur if the defendant establishes due cause by claiming the distribution of the subverted advertisement was in the interests of the public.

=== Injurious falsehood ===
If a subverted advertisement has brought a company or label into disrepute, a brand owner may bring a claim of injurious or Malicious falsehood against the artist. For a claim of injurious falsehood to be successful, the complainant must prove malice on behalf of the publisher, substantial damage suffered due to the publication, and that some (or part) of the publication contained a falsehood.

=== Freedom of expression ===
Freedom of expression remains the most common defence usable by Brandalism artists in response to claims of Copyright infringement, Trade mark infringement or injurious falsehood. The right to freedom of expression is stipulated in Article 19 of the Universal Declaration of Human Rights (1948), Article 10 of the European Convention on Human Rights (1953) and is also constitutionally protected in many democratic nations. It constitutes ones individual right to freely express their opinions, views and ideas, and to seek, receive and impart information.

== See also ==
- Activism
- Anti-consumerism
- Billboard hijacking
- Protest art
- Situationist International
- Subvertising
- Culture jamming
- Détournement
