= Culture jamming =

Form of protest to subvert media culture

Culture jamming (sometimes also guerrilla communication) is a form of protest used by many anti-consumerist social movements to disrupt or subvert media culture and its mainstream cultural institutions, including corporate advertising. It attempts to "expose the methods of domination" of mass society.

Culture jamming employs techniques originally associated with Letterist International, and later Situationist International known as détournement. It uses the language and rhetoric of mainstream culture to subversively critique the social institutions that produce that culture. Tactics include editing company logos to critique the respective companies, products, or concepts they represent, or wearing fashion statements that criticize the current fashion trends by deliberately clashing with them. Culture jamming often entails using mass media to produce ironic or satirical commentary about itself, commonly using the original medium's communication method. Culture jamming is also a form of subvertising.

Culture jamming aims to highlight and challenge the political assumptions underlying commercial culture, and argues that culture jamming is a response to socially imposed conformity. Prominent examples of culture jamming include the adulteration of billboard advertising by the Billboard Liberation Front and contemporary artists such as Ron English. Culture jamming may involve street parties and protests. While culture jamming usually focuses on subverting or critiquing political and advertising messages, some proponents focus on a different form which brings together artists, designers, scholars, and activists to create works that transcend the status quo rather than merely criticize it. In addition to these political and cultural aims, researchers have noted that the pleasure involved in culture jamming plays an important role in sustaining participation. Analysts argue that fun can link individual acts of subversion to a broader, imagined protest community, helping disparate actions feel part of a shared project. This affective style both draws on and resists the dominant emotion regime of late capitalism, making emotional engagement not only a tactic but also an end in itself.

== Origins of the term, etymology, and history ==
The term was coined by Don Joyce of American sound collage band Negativland, with the release of their album JamCon '84. The phrase "culture jamming" comes from the idea of radio jamming, where public frequencies can be pirated and subverted for independent communication, or to disrupt dominant frequencies used by governments. In one of the tracks of the album, Joyce stated:

As awareness of how the media environment we occupy affects and directs our inner life grows, some resist. The skillfully reworked billboard... directs the public viewer to a consideration of the original corporate strategy. The studio for the cultural jammer is the world at large.

According to Vince Carducci, although the term was coined by Negativland, the practice of culture jamming can be traced as far back as the 1950s. One particularly influential group that was active in Europe was the Situationist International and was led by Guy Debord. The SI asserted that in the past, humans dealt with life and the consumer market directly. They argued that this spontaneous way of life was slowly deteriorating as a direct result of the new "modern" way of life. Situationists saw everything from television to radio as a threat and argued that life in industrialized areas, driven by capitalist forces, had become monotonous, sterile, gloomy, linear, and productivity-driven. In particular, the SI argued humans had become passive recipients of the spectacle, a simulated reality that generates the desire to consume, and positions humans as obedient consumerist cogs within the efficient and exploitative productivity loop of capitalism. Through playful activity, individuals could create situations, the opposite of spectacles. For the SI, these situations took the form of the dérive, or the active drift of the body through space in ways that broke routine and overcame boundaries, creating situations by exiting habit and entering new interactive possibilities.

The cultural critic Mark Dery traces the origins of culture jamming to medieval carnival, which Mikhail Bakhtin interpreted, in Rabelais and His World and other writings, as an officially sanctioned inversion of the social hierarchy. Modern precursors might include: the media-savvy agit-prop of the anti-Nazi photomonteur John Heartfield, the sociopolitical street theater and staged media events of 1960s radicals such as Abbie Hoffman, Joey Skaggs, the German concept of Spaßguerilla, and in the Situationist International (SI) of the 1950s and 1960s. The SI first compared its own activities to radio jamming in 1968, when it proposed the use of guerrilla communication within mass media to sow confusion within the dominant culture. In 1985, the Guerrilla Girls formed to expose discrimination and corruption in the art world.

Dery's 1990 New York Times article on culture jamming, "The Merry Pranksters And the Art of the Hoax" was the first mainstream media mention of the phenomenon; Dery later expanded on this article in his 1993 Open Magazine pamphlet, Culture Jamming: Hacking, Slashing, and Sniping in the Empire of the Signs, a seminal essay that remains the most exhaustive historical, sociopolitical, and philosophical theorization of culture jamming to date. Adbusters, a Canadian publication espousing an environmentalist critique of consumerism and advertising, began promoting aspects of culture jamming after Dery introduced founder and editor Kalle Lasn to the term through a series of articles he wrote for the magazine. In her critique of consumerism, No Logo, the Canadian cultural commentator and political activist Naomi Klein examines culture jamming in a chapter that focuses on the work of Jorge Rodriguez-Gerada. Through an analysis of the Where the Hell is Matt viral videos, researchers Milstein and Pulos analyze how the power of the culture jam to disrupt the status quo is currently being threatened by increasing commercial incorporation. For example, T-Mobile utilized the Liverpool street underground station to host a flashmob to sell their mobile services.

== Tactics ==
Graffitied text on billboard in Cambridge, UK

Culture jamming is a form of disruption that plays on the emotions of viewers and bystanders. Jammers want to disrupt the unconscious thought process that takes place when most consumers view a popular advertising and bring about a détournement. Activists that utilize this tactic are counting on their meme to pull on the emotional strings of people and evoke some type of reaction. The reactions that most cultural jammers are hoping to evoke are behavioral change and political action. There are four emotions that activists often want viewers to feel. These emotions – shock, shame, fear, and anger – are believed to be the catalysts for social change. Culture jamming also intersects with forms of legal transgression. Semiotic disobedience, for example, involves both authorial and proprietary disobedience, while techniques such as coercive disobedience comprise acts of culture jamming combined with a demonstration of the retaliatory actions (legal consequences) handed down by the ruling apparatus.

One of the earliest American culture jammers, Joey Skaggs began staging elaborate media hoaxes in the 1960s as a form of social critique and performance art. His satirical projects, including the Cathouse for Dogs (a fictitious brothel for canines) and the Comacocoon (a fake sensory-deprivation vacation therapy), targeted institutional authority and exposed the media's susceptibility to sensationalism. Skaggs' interventions are regarded as foundational to the development of culture jamming as a strategy for media activism and public discourse.

The basic unit in which a message is transmitted in culture jamming is the meme. Memes are condensed images that stimulate visual, verbal, musical, or behavioral associations that people can easily imitate and transmit to others. The term meme was coined and first popularized by evolutionary biologist Richard Dawkins, but later used by cultural critics such as Douglas Rushkoff, who claimed memes were a type of media virus. Memes are seen as genes that can jump from outlet to outlet and replicate themselves or mutate upon transmission, just like a virus.

Culture jammers will often use common symbols such as the McDonald's golden arches or Nike swoosh to engage people and force them to think about their eating habits or fashion sense. In one example, jammer Jonah Peretti used the Nike symbol to stir debate on sweatshop child labor and consumer freedom. Peretti made public exchanges between himself and Nike over a disagreement. Peretti had requested custom Nikes with the word "sweatshop" placed in the Nike symbol. Nike refused. Once this story was made public, it spread worldwide and contributed to the already robust conversation about Nike's use of sweatshops, which had been ongoing for a decade prior to Peretti's 2001 stunt.

In 2002, French street artist Zevs cut a ten-meter model out of a Lavazza billboard at Alexanderplatz in Berlin and wrote "VISUAL KIDNAPPING – PAY NOW!" above the hole. He demanded a €500,000 ransom from the company and mailed one of the model's fingers to its headquarters in Turin. In the late 1990s, the artist KAWS removed bus shelter ads in New York, added his characters that interacted with the models, and then reinstalled them behind the glass.

Jammers can also organize and participate in mass campaigns. Examples of cultural jamming like Peretti's are more along the lines of tactics that radical consumer social movements would use. These movements push people to question the taken-for-granted assumption that consuming is natural and good and aim to disrupt the naturalization of consumer culture; they also seek to create systems of production and consumption that are more humane and less dominated by global corporate late capitalism.

Past mass events and ideas have included Buy Nothing Day, virtual sit-ins and protests over the Internet, producing ‘subvertisements' and placing them in public spaces, and creating and enacting ‘place jamming' projects where public spaces are reclaimed and nature is re-introduced into urban places.

The most effective form of jamming is to use an already widely recognizable meme to transmit the message. Once viewers are forced to take a second look at the mimicked popular meme they are forced out of their comfort zone. Viewers are presented with another way to view the meme and are forced to think about the implications presented by the jammer. More often than not, when this is used as a tactic the jammer is going for shock value. For example, to make consumers aware of the negative body image that big-name fashion brands are frequently accused of causing, a subvertisement of Calvin Klein's 'Obsession' was created and played worldwide. It depicted a young woman with an eating disorder throwing up into a toilet.

Another way that social consumer movements hope to utilize culture jamming effectively is by employing a metameme. A metameme is a two-level message that punctures a specific commercial image but does so in a way that challenges some larger aspect of the political culture of corporate domination. An example would be the "true cost" campaign set in motion by Adbusters. "True cost" forced consumers to compare the human labor cost and conditions and environmental drawbacks of products to the sales costs. Another example would be the "Truth" campaigns that exposed the deception tobacco companies used to sell their products.

Following critical scholars like Paulo Freire, culture jams are also being integrated into the university classroom setting, "in which students and teachers gain the opportunity not only to learn methods of informed public critique but also to collaboratively use participatory communication techniques to actively create new locations of meaning." For example, students disrupt public space to bring attention to community concerns or utilize subvertisements to engage with media literacy projects.

=== Examples ===
- Artivist
- Billboard hacking
- Broadcast signal intrusion
- Détournement
- Flash mob
- Happening
- Practical joke topics
- Steal This Album!
- Steal This Book

Groups

- Billboard Liberation Front
- Billboard Utilising Graffitists Against Unhealthy Promotions
- Crimethinc
- Guerrilla Girls
- Merry Pranksters
- monochrom
- Operation Mindfuck
- The Yes Men
- Youth International Party

== Criticism ==
Some scholars and activists, such as Amory Starr and Joseph D. Rumbo, have argued that culture jamming is futile because it is easily co-opted and commodified by the market, which tends to "defuse" its potential for consumer resistance. A newer understanding of the term has been called for that would encourage artists, scholars and activists to come together and create innovative, flexible, and practical mobile art pieces that communicate intellectual and political concepts and new strategies and actions.

== See also ==
- Anti-corporate activism
- Banksy
- Brandalism
- Counterculture
- Critical theory
- Dada
- Doppelgänger brand image
- The Firesign Theatre
- Minority influence
- Protest art
- Subvertising
- Tactical media

== General and cited references ==
- Branwyn, Gareth (1996). Jamming the Media: A Citizen's Guide—Reclaiming the Tools of Communication. California: Chronicle Books ISBN 9780811817950
- Dery, Mark (1993). Culture Jamming: Hacking, Slashing, and Sniping in the Empire of Signs. Open Magazine Pamphlet Series: NJ."Shovelware". Markdery.com. Archived from the original on 2009-04-22. ASIN B0006P19L8
- King, Donovan (2004). University of Calgary. Optative Theatre: A Critical Theory for Challenging Oppression and Spectacle
- Klein, Naomi (2000). No Logo London: Flamingo. ISBN 9780312421434
- Kyoto Journal: Culture Jammer's Guide to Enlightenment
- Lasn, Kalle (1999) Culture Jam. New York: Eagle Brook. ISBN 978-0688178055
- LeVine, Mark (2005) Why They Don't Hate Us: Lifting the Veil on the Axis of Evil. Oxford, UK: Oneworld Publications. ISBN 978-1851683659
- LeVine, Mark (2017) "Putting the 'Jamming' into Culture Jamming: Theory, Praxis and Cultural Production During the Arab Spring," in DeLaure, Marilyn; Fink, Moritz; eds. (2017). Culture Jamming: Activism and the Art of Cultural Resistance. New York University Press. ISBN 978-1-4798-0620-1
- Perini, Julie (2010). "Art as Intervention: A Guide to Today's Radical Art Practices". In Team Colors Collective (ed.). Uses of a Whirlwind: Movement, Movements, and Contemporary Radical Currents in the United States. AK Press. ISBN 9781849350167.
- Tietchen, T. Language out of Language: Excavating the Roots of Culture Jamming and Postmodern Activism from William S. Burroughs' Nova Trilogy Discourse: Berkeley Journal for Theoretical Studies in Media and Culture. 23, Part 3 (2001): 107–130. ISSN 1536-1810
- Chaudhary, Shikher (2 August 2010). "Culture Jamming". helterskelter.in.
- Milstein, Tema & Pulos, Alexis (2015). "Culture Jam Pedagogy and Practice: Relocating Culture by Staying on One's Toes". Communication, Culture & Critique 8 (3): 393–413.
