= Situationist prank =

Practical joke intended to subvert media culture

Situationist prank is a term used in the mass media to label a distinctive tactic by the Situationist International, consisting of setting up a subversive political prank, hoax, or stunt; In the terminology of the Situationist International, stunts and media pranks are very similar to situations. The détournement technique, that is "turning expressions of the capitalist system against itself", was the essential element of a situationist prank. The Situationist tactic of using détournement for subversive pranks is such a distinctive and influential aspect of the Situationist International, that they are sometimes labeled as a group of political pranksters.

This tactic was used by the Sex Pistols to mock Queen Elizabeth II's Silver Jubilee celebrations. Frank Discussion of the band the Feederz is well known for his situationist pranks and detournement in the United States since the late 1970s. It also inspired the culture jamming movement in the late 1980s. The expression situationist prankster has been later established as a typical label used on those who perform media pranks or publicity stunts.

== By Situationists ==
=== Notre-Dame Affair on National TV ===
One of the earliest Situationist pranks, the Notre-Dame Affair was an intervention performed by members of the radical wing of the Lettrist movement (Michel Mourre, Serge Berna, Ghislain Desnoyers de Marbaix and Jean Rullier), on Easter Sunday, April 9, 1950, at Notre-Dame Cathedral in Paris, while the mass was aired live on National TV. Michel Mourre, dressed in the habit of a Dominican friar and backed by his co-conspirators, chose a quiet moment in the Easter High Mass to climb to the rostrum and declaim before the whole congregation a blasphemous anti-sermon on the death of God, penned by Serge Berna.

=== Strasbourg scandal ===
Taking advantage of the apathy of their colleagues, five "Pro-situs", Situationist-influenced students had infiltrated the University of Strasbourg's student union in November 1966 and began scandalising the authorities. Their first action was to form an "anarchist appreciation society" called The Society for the Rehabilitation for Karl Marx and Ravachol; next they appropriated union funds to flypost "Return of the Durruti Column", André Bertrand's détourned comic strip. They then invited the Situationists to contribute a critique of the University of Strasbourg, and On the Poverty of Student Life, written by Tunisian Situationist Mustapha/Omar Khayati was the result. The students promptly proceeded to print 10,000 copies of the pamphlet using university funds and distributed them during a ceremony marking the beginning of the academic year. This provoked an immediate outcry in the local, national and international media.

=== Sanguinetti's Report to save capitalism ===
By 1972, Gianfranco Sanguinetti and Guy Debord were the only two remaining members of Situationist International. Working with Debord, in August 1975, Sanguinetti wrote a pamphlet titled Rapporto veridico sulle ultime opportunità di salvare il capitalismo in Italia (Eng: Veritable Report on the Last Chances to Save Capitalism in Italy), which (inspired by Bruno Bauer) purported to be the cynical writing of "Censor", a powerful industrialist. The pamphlet argues that the ruling class of Italy supported the Piazza Fontana bombing and other mass slaughter, for the higher goal of defending the capitalist status quo from communist claims. The pamphlet was mailed to 520 of Italy's most powerful individuals. It was received as genuine, and powerful politicians, industrialists and journalists praised its contents and guessed the identity of its high-profile author. After reprinting the tract into a small book, Sanguinetti revealed himself to be the true author. Under pressure from Italian authorities, Sanguinetti left Italy in February 1976, and was denied re-entry to France, from which he had previously been deported in 1971.

=== Others ===
Film Hurlements en faveur de Sade (Howls for de Sade) (1952) by Guy Debord, had 24 minutes of black screen. Book Mémoires (1959) by Guy Debord and Asger Jorn had the cover made of sandpaper.

== Legacy ==
The situationist tactic of a détournement-based hoax was notoriously used in June 1977 by the Sex Pistols, who played their version of "God Save the Queen" while sailing down the River Thames past the Houses of Parliament to mock the Silver Jubilee river procession in honor of Queen Elizabeth II. The expression "situationist prankster" has been later established as a typical label used on those who perform media pranks or publicity stunts, as in the cases of The KLF, the K Foundation, Genesis P-Orridge, Harun Farocki, and others.

A growth of campaigns using tactics such as the Flash Mob or Subvertising in recent years can be traced to situationist pranks. These tactics, notable in stunts by The Yes Men, campaigns by Greenpeace, and guerilla art by Banksy, have been characterised by their appropriation of establishment symbols, shifting the intended purpose of public (now private) space, or creating bizarre reality hacks that merely remix the cultural context, as opposed to providing something entirely surreal. Some surreal pranks continue to exist in more subversive movements, such as the Alley concept, and are traceable to situationist pranks in their deliberate constructions of surreal situations that juxtapose the Spectacle thereby aiming to reawaken authentic desires and liberate everyday life.

The concept forms the primary genre on popular Australian television series "The Chaser's War on Everything." Worldwide media attention followed their successful entry into the G20 Summit held in Sydney, Australia - September 2007. The group formed a motorcade with a Bin Laden-esque character inside a limousine flying flags of a non-existent country.

== See also ==
- Psychological warfare
- Youth International Party
