= Subvertising =

Parody advertising

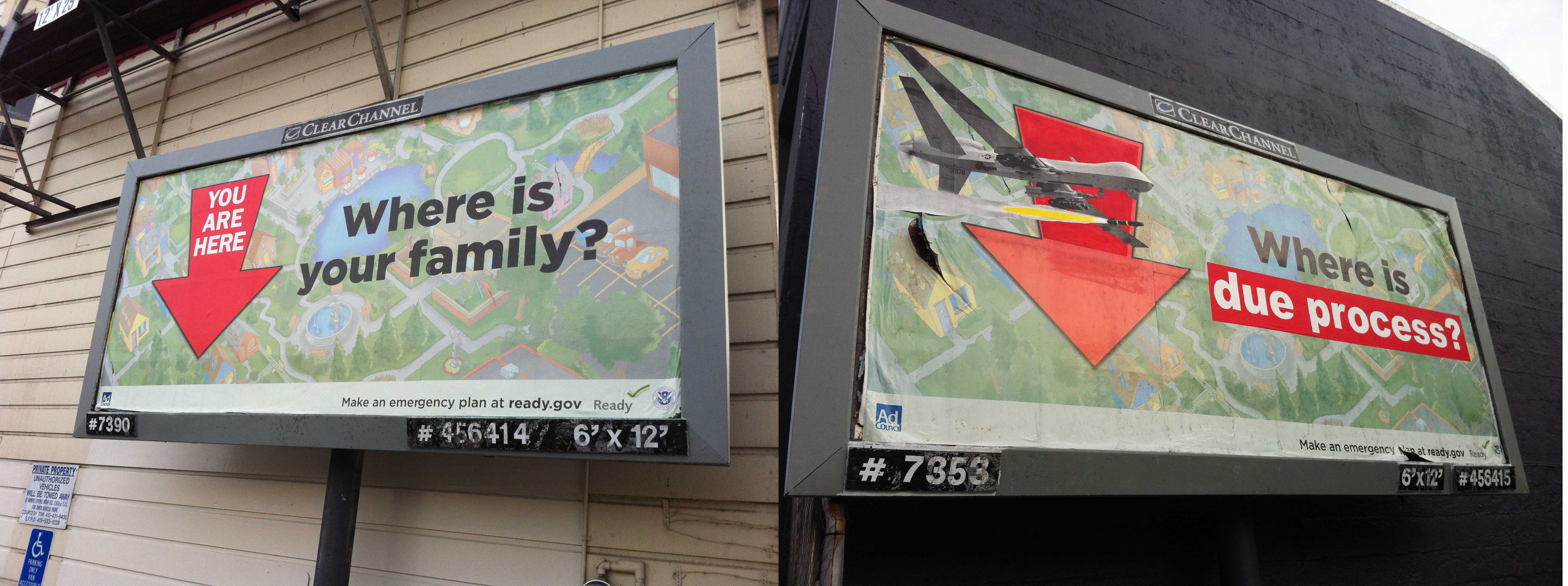
Two billboards with the same original content; the billboard on the right is an example of subvertising after being vandalized.

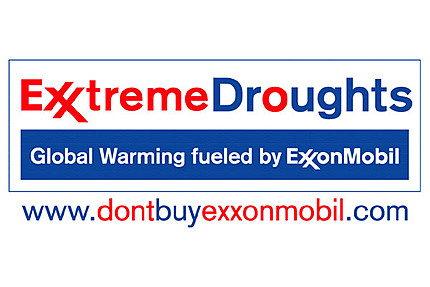
The ExxonMobil logo as subverted by Greenpeace.

Subvertising (a portmanteau of subvert and advertising) is the practice of making spoofs or parodies of corporate and political advertisements. The cultural critic Mark Dery coined the term in 1991. Subvertisements are anti-ads that deflect advertising's attempts to turn the people's attention in a given direction. According to author Naomi Klein, subvertising offers a way of speaking back to advertising, ‘forcing a dialogue where before there was only a declaration.’ They may take the form of a new image or an alteration to an existing image or icon, often in a satirical manner.

A subvertisement can also be referred to as a meme hack and can be a part of social hacking, billboard hacking or culture jamming. Although he rarely altered physical ads, American performance artist Joey Skaggs' media interventions function as subvertisements. By parodying authoritative narratives and co-opting mass communication tools, he delivers countercultural messages which align with subvertising's intent to disrupt and critique dominant cultural messages using the very channels that propagate them.

According to Adbusters, a Canadian magazine and a proponent of counter-culture and subvertising, "A well-produced 'subvert' mimics the look and feel of the targeted ad, promoting the classic 'double-take' as viewers suddenly realize they have been duped. Subverts create cognitive dissonance, with the apparent aim of cutting through the 'hype and glitz of our mediated reality' to reveal a 'deeper truth within'.

Subvertising is a type of advertising hijacking (détournement publicité), where détournement techniques developed in the 1950s by the French Letterist International and later used by the better-known Situationist International have been used as a contemporary critical form to re-route advertising messages.

The adoption of culture-jamming techniques by commercial advertisers has also been examined. In the edited collection Culture Jamming: Activism and the Art of Cultural Resistance (2017), Michael Serazio discusses the use of such tactics in guerrilla marketing, focusing on the advertising agency Crispin Porter + Bogusky.

== Notable instances ==
In 1972, the logo of Richard Nixon's re-election campaign posters was subverted with two x's in Nixon's name (as in the Exxon logo) to suggest the corporate ownership of the Republican Party.

In Sydney, Australia in October 1979, a group of anti-smoking activists formed a group called B.U.G.A.U.P. and began altering the text on tobacco billboards to subvert the messages of tobacco advertisers. Advertisements for other unhealthy products were also targeted.

On November 6, 2008, The Yes Men recruited thousands of social activists to hand out 100,000 copies of a spoof New York Times newspaper set six months in the future. The goal was to utilize a tangible and trusted medium, the New York Times, to argue for a particular future, in that case, one where the Iraq War had ended. Other groups involved with this project included Anti-Advertising Agency, Code Pink, United for Peace and Justice, May First/People Link, and Improv Everywhere.

At the 2015 Paris COP21 climate conference, the collective known as Brandalism installed 600 posters that attacked what they perceived as the hypocrisy of corporate sponsors.

In 2017, Brandalism and other groups of subvertisers founded the collective Subvertisers International. Using billboard hacking and other forms of subvertising, they promote the idea that advertising creates unhealthy body images, impacts democracy negatively, and sustains a culture of consumerism that takes a heavy toll on the planet.

Around 2018, a group in London called Legally Black changed the race of the characters in Harry Potter posters from white to black., a similar tactic has been used by the Twitter/X user "VLONEPREDATOR" on a wide variety of Twitter users & public figures, including Andrew Tate and JD Vance.

In 2022, billboards in London, Bristol, Manchester, Sheffield, Brighton, and 11 other European cities, were hijacked to highlight the role of airline emissions in the climate crisis. They highlighted the large carbon footprint of flying, that the majority of flights are taken by a tiny fraction of the total population, and that airlines have missed all but one of the industry’s self-imposed sustainability targets.

From July to August 2022, 4000 #RacismoNeon posters were placed across central Mexico City where advertising and marketing companies are located to generate a conversation on "Decolonizing Mexican Advertising" in order to "remove colonial thinking" from ads and increase the number of people of colour (mestizos) shown in advertising. The poster campaign was inspired by the posters of Situationist International.

In January 2025, German police began investigating the distribution of political fliers from the far‑right Alternative für Deutschland party that closely resembled airline tickets and targeted "illegal immigrants". The fliers were placed in the mailboxes of people living in immigrant areas. Karlsruhe criminal police said they are seeking "persons unknown on suspicion of incitement of racial hatred".

In October 2026, parody punk band Civic Joy Fucks and artist collective Upcycled Brigade installed parody ads in San Francisco bus stops satirizing AI company ads. One such poster read, “We hope you die cold and alone on the streets after our AI employee replaces you, you piece of shit.”

== See also ==
- Steve Lambert – American artist (born 1976)
- Brandalism – UK activist artist collective (2012-)
- CODEPINK – US pacifist, anti-war organization
- Criticism of advertising
- Culture jamming – Form of protest to subvert media culture
- Cultures of Resistance – Brazilian filmmaker and activist (born 1966)
- Czech Dream
- Darren Cullen (cartoonist) – British artist and political cartoonist
- Doppelgänger brand image – Parody logo highlighting ethical isssues
- Hungarian Two Tailed Dog Party – Political party in Hungary
- Improv Everywhere – Comedic performance art group based in New York City
- May First/People Link
- Meme hack – Artistic style
- United for Peace and Justice – US coalition of peace organizations
- Wacky Packages – Trading cards featuring parodies of consumer products
