= Détournement =

Artistic style

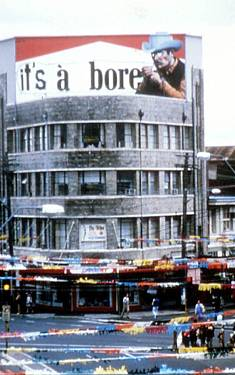
A Marlboro cigarette advertisement on a billboard détourned by the group BUGAUP, by defacing the cowboy image and modifying the text to read "It's a bore."

A détournement (French: [detuʁnəmɑ̃]), meaning "rerouting, hijacking" in French, is a technique developed in the 1950s by the Letterist International, and later adapted by the Situationist International (SI), that was defined in the SI's inaugural 1958 journal as "[t]he integration of present or past artistic productions into a superior construction of a milieu. In this sense there can be no situationist painting or music, but only a situationist use of those means. In a more elementary sense, détournement within the old cultural spheres is a method of propaganda, a method which reveals the wearing out and loss of importance of those spheres."

The brand marketing specialist Douglas B. Holt defined it as "turning expressions of the capitalist system and its media culture against itself".

Détournement was prominently used to set up subversive political pranks, an influential tactic called situationist prank that was reprised by the punk movement in the late 1970s and inspired the culture jamming movement in the late 1980s.

Its opposite is recuperation, in which radical ideas or the social image of people who are viewed negatively are twisted, commodified, and absorbed in a more socially acceptable context.

== Definition ==
In general, détournement can be defined as a variation on previous work, in which the newly created work has a meaning that is antagonistic or antithetical to the original. The original media work that is détourned must be somewhat familiar to the target audience, so that it can appreciate the opposition of the new message. The artist or commentator making the variation can reuse only some of the characteristic elements of the originating work.

Détournement is similar to satirical parody, but employs more direct reuse or faithful mimicry of the original works rather than constructing a new work which merely alludes strongly to the original. It may be contrasted with recuperation, in which originally subversive works and ideas are themselves appropriated by mainstream media. Détournement, on the other hand, makes it possible for the images produced by the spectacle to be altered and subverted so that rather than supporting the status quo, their meaning becomes changed in order to put across a more radical or oppositional message.

Guy Debord and Gil J. Wolman categorized détourned elements into two types: minor détournements and deceptive détournements. Minor détournements are détournements of elements that in themselves are of no real importance such as a snapshot, a press clipping, an everyday object which draw all their meaning from being placed in a new context. Deceptive détournements are when already significant elements such as a major political or philosophical text, great artwork or work of literature take on new meanings or scope by being placed in a new context. For Debord, a détournement is a way to expose explicitly the inner workings of the objective reality of the Spectacle, thus creating a window for criticism.

== Examples after the Situationist International ==
In the United States, Frank Discussion is widely known for his use of détournement in his works dating from the late 1970s through the present, particularly with The Feederz. The use of détournement by Barbara Kruger familiarised many with the technique, and it was extensively and effectively used as part of the early HIV/AIDS activism of the late 1980s and early 1990s. Examples of contemporary detournement include Adbusters' "subvertisements" and other instances of culture jamming, as well as poems composed collaboratively by Marlene Mountain, Paul Conneally, and others, in which quotations from such famous sources as the Ten Commandments and quotations by United States President George W. Bush are combined with haiku-like phrases to produce a larger work intended to subvert the original source. The comic artist Brad Neely's reinterpretation of Harry Potter, Wizard People, took Warner Bros.' first Harry Potter film, The Sorcerer's Stone, and substituted the original soundtrack with a narration that casts the hero as a Nietzschean superman.

The concept of detournement has had a popular influence amongst contemporary radicals, and the technique can be seen in action in the present day when looking at the work of Culture Jammers including the Cacophony Society, Billboard Liberation Front, monochrom, Occupy Movements and Adbusters, whose "subvertisements" "detourn" Nike adverts, for example. In this case, the original advertisement's imagery is altered in order to draw attention to said company's policy of shifting their production base to cheap-labour third-world "free trade zones". From the late 1970s to the early 1990s health campaigners operating under the name of BUGA-UP (Billboard Utilising Graffitists Against Unhealthy Promotions) revised hundreds of tobacco and alcohol industry billboards around Australia to include satirical and condemnatory messages. However, the line between "recuperation" and "détournement" can become thin (or at least very fuzzy) at times, as Naomi Klein points out in her book No Logo. Here she details how corporations such as Nike, Pepsi or Diesel have approached Culture Jammers and Adbusters and offered them lucrative contracts in return for partaking in "ironic" promotional campaigns. She points out further irony by drawing attention to merchandising produced in order to promote Adbusters' Buy Nothing Day, an example of the recuperation of détournement if ever there was one.

Klein's arguments about irony reifying rather than breaking down power structures are echoed by Slavoj Žižek. Žižek argues that the kind of distance opened up by détournement is the condition of possibility for ideology to operate: by attacking and distancing oneself from the sign-systems of capital, the subject creates a fantasy of transgression that "covers up" their actual complicity with capitalism as an overarching system. In contrast, scholars are very fond of pointing out the differences between hypergraphics, "detournement", the postmodern idea of appropriation and the Neoist use of plagiarism as the use of different and similar techniques used for different and similar means, effects and causes.

The Neue Slowenische Kunst has a long history of aggressive détournement of extreme political ideologies, as do several industrial music groups, such as Die Krupps, Nitzer Ebb, KMFDM, and Front 242.

In contemporary comics, Belgian publisher La Cinquième Couche has produced several notable détournements, including Katz (2012) by Ilan Manouach—a reworking of Art Spiegelman's Maus—and Noirs (2014), based on The Black Smurfs.

Chris Morris uses détournement and culture jamming extensively in his work, particularly in the British television series The Day Today and Brass Eye.

== Détournement in advertising ==
In advertising, a détournement (détournement publicitaire in French) is almost like subvertising, except that the goal of a détournement is to promote a product by mocking the way another one is promoted. In October 2023, Netflix used the advertising visual style of luxury jewelry brands but with models that were obviously missing those jewels, a trick to promote the series Lupin. In 2012, Sixt made a détournement of François Hollande's presidential campaign for a billboard ad.

Naomi Klein describes this as a récuperation of détournement. In Debord's words, in the case of advertising, the détournement reverses the Spectacle, and in doing so becomes the Spectacle. Examples include Sprite's Image is nothing, Nike's 1997 campaign slogan 'I am not/A target market/I am an athlete', and Colin Kaepernick's Taking the knee Nike campaign.

== See also ==
- Anti-art
- Culture jamming
- Comic strip switcheroo
- Doppelgänger brand image
- Recuperation (politics)
- Scratch video
- Subvertising
- YouTube Poop
- Brandalism

== Footnotes ==
- BUGA-UP – Billboard Utilising Graffitists Against Unhealthy Promotions 10 April 2019. Retrieved 29 January 2025
