= Media prank =

Type of media event

A media prank is a type of media event, perpetrated by staged speeches, activities, or press releases, designed to trick legitimate journalists into publishing erroneous or misleading articles. The term may also refer to such stories if planted by fake journalists, as well as the false story thereby published. A media prank is a form of culture jamming generally done as performance art or a practical joke for purposes of a humorous critique of mass media.

== Notable instances ==
In May 1927, Jean-Paul Sartre, who was known as one of the fiercest pranksters at the École Normale Superieure organized with his comrades Nizan, Larroutis, Baillou and Herland, a media prank following Charles Lindbergh's successful New York-Paris flight. Sartre & Co. called newspapers telling them that Lindbergh would be awarded an honorary degree by the École. Many newspapers including Le Petit Parisien announced the event on May 25 and thousands showed up, unaware that they were witnessing a stunt with a look-alike. A scandal followed resulting in the resignation of the École director Gustave Lanson.

One well-known 1967 prank, orchestrated by Abbie Hoffman and Allen Ginsberg and chronicled in Norman Mailer's Armies of the Night, involved a mock gathering protesting the Vietnam War (that many media took as a serious but misguided effort) intended to levitate the Pentagon. Joey Skaggs is one of the most prolific creators of media pranks in the United States, often using actors to stage outlandish public events that are then covered by news media as real stories. Among his many pranks, he convinced United Press International to report that cockroach hormones had been identified as a cure for arthritis, acne, and radiation poisoning, and tricked WABC-TV in New York City to create a news segment (which was nominated for and won an Emmy Award despite being untrue) about a supposed "cathouse for dogs". In a 1987 interview, Skaggs said, "I started doing hoaxes to point out the inadequacies and dangers of an irresponsible press".

During the late 1980s members of activist group Grevillea hoaxed Australian journalists by creating a fake organization called LILAC WA (Ladies In Line Against Communist Western Australia). The name was slightly altered from that of an existing far-right association. They held a series of events in Perth, including a Walk For Wealth, to raise money for billionaire and owner of the Channel 9 television station, 9 News Perth, Alan Bond, whose businesses were ailing. Their actions were covered by media outlets around the country with some journalists reportedly being fooled by the deception and others playing along with the prank.

The band Negativland is (according to Time Magazine) "better known for media pranks than records". The band, as an excuse for cancelling an upcoming tour, issued a press release claiming that a teenager who had committed a multiple axe murder did so after arguing with his parents over the meaning of its song, "Christianity Is Stupid". The story was picked up and reprinted as true by mass media, and the band wrote later songs about having perpetrated the hoax. In 2003 the band issued a series of press releases accusing Seattle, Washington, radio station KJR-FM of playing 1980s music despite claiming it only played "the best of the 60s and 70s" then, after the radio station changed its format, issued more press releases announcing that it had all been a prank.

Beginning in 1999 with the fake campaign-oriented website gwbush.com, the Yes Men have impersonated famous celebrities, politicians, and business officials at appearances, interviews, websites, and other media to make political points.

In December 2009, an Argentina news station fell victim to a media prank. Acting on a Facebook link, an investigative reporter believed that the latest trend in underage drinking was tied to a new cocktail mix called Grog XD. Unbeknown to the reporter, the recipe was from the video game The Secret of Monkey Island.

=== Portofess ===
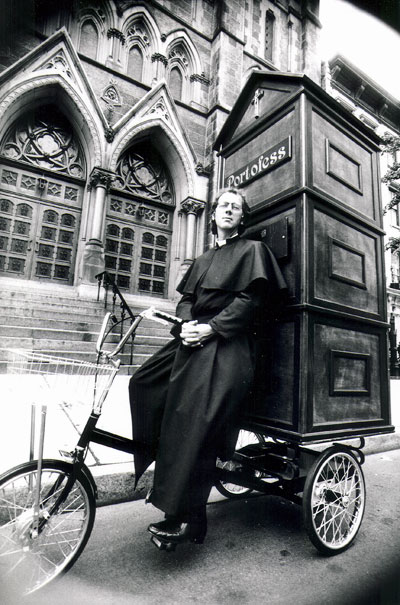
Multiple media outlets were fooled by this 1992 Joey Skaggs prank.

Joey Skaggs, posing as the fictional Father Anthony Joseph, pedaled a confessional booth mounted on a tricycle to the 1992 Democratic National Convention in New York City. Dubbed "Portofess", the portable confessional offering "religion on the move for people on the go", fooled dozens of journalists before the hoax was exposed.

=== Voltswagen joke ===
In March 2021, several major media outlets reported that Volkswagen was rebranding itself as "Voltswagen" to focus on the development of electric vehicles. Despite the company's release of an official statement declaring the name change was an early April Fools' joke, CNN, NBC News, and The Washington Post fell for the gag.

=== Ligma–Johnson hoax ===
On October 28, 2022, a pair of amateur improvisational actors pranked multiple major media outlets with a spontaneous and intentionally transparent hoax that was revealed the same day. As reporters congregated outside Twitter headquarters on the day Elon Musk took control of the company, the instigator, playing the fictional role of Rahul Ligma, "thought it would be really funny" if he and a friend "walked out with a [cardboard] box and they fell for it." After interviewing the two pranksters, neither of whom had ever worked for Twitter, journalists at CNBC, Bloomberg, ABC News, and other networks reported that mass layoffs were underway. On October 31, 2022, CNBC's Deidre Bosa apologized and told The Daily Beast, "They got me" and "I didn't do enough to confirm who they were".

The India Times called the hoax "perfectly-timed" and "one of the greatest pranks on the internet". Blake Shuster wrote in USA Today that the journalists involved were "duped by real life trolls" and "all it would’ve taken was 30 seconds to stop and actually do their jobs to avoid the whole news-cycle". One of the actors explained that the stunt was spontaneous, and that "I was hoping at least one guy there would get it and they would turn off the cameras".

The following month, Musk called their October media stunt "one of the best trolls ever" and continued the joke by apologizing for "firing these geniuses", facetiously saying it was "truly one of [my] biggest mistakes" and offered them their jobs back. The Hindi news channel Aaj Tak reported the comic duo's fictional rehiring as an actual news story, as did VOI of Indonesia and The Hill of the U.S.

=== EcoWarrior Barbie hoax ===
In August 2023, actor and environment activist Darryl Hannah, in concert with the Yes Men and the Barbie Liberation Organization, produced a press release and a promotional video purportedly by Mattel, promising that the company's Barbie dolls would manufactured without plastic products by 2030. People magazine and the Dow Jones Newswire ran stories, later retracted, about "EcoWarrior Barbie" with comments from impersonators of Mattel representatives. Looper said one of the fake commercials released to the press, featuring the hoax doll's "Pussy Riot Accessory Pack" that contained Molotov cocktails and zip-tie handcuffs, "should have raised editorial eyebrows".

== Deep fakes and AI-driven stunts ==
In more recent years, Artificial Intelligence tools have given people the ability to perform many "Deep Fakes" or media stunts. The ability to use facial-recognition software in efforts to replicate an individual's identity is becoming more popular. As a result, the United States Congress and United Kingdom have attempted to create new repercussions for those engaging in these creations. The United Kingdom's 2023 Online Safety Act, expanded upon the Sexual Offenses Act 2003 making it illegal to share any explicit images of an individual without their consent. It also made it illegal to threaten sharing images of an individual.

=== Facebook ===
The United States has experienced a variety of different Deep Fakes. In 2019, Mark Zuckerberg, CEO and founder of Facebook, was quoted in a video stating, "Imagine this for a second: One man, with total control of billions of people’s stolen data, all their secrets, their lives, their futures”. This caused commotion for Facebook users, making them question Zuckerberg's loyalty and respect for their privacy.

=== Fake AI images ===
In January 2024, AI-generated pornographic images of music artist Taylor Swift went viral on Twitter. These images were spread in efforts to hurt Swift's reputation and to shock her fans. Some US Congress members said they were "appalled" by the images and called for an investigation.

=== The 2024 presidential election ===
The use of Deep Fakes has shifted into audial forms in recent years. This year, during the 2024 presidential election, President Joe Biden's voice was replicated by Steve Kramer, a political consultant, and used to prank call voters of the New Hampshire state. His voice emphasized that these voters should not go to the polls and vote, causing controversy amongst Democrats as they once believed Biden was in favor of voting for Presidential Candidate Kamala Harris, and in support of the election. Upon reviewal, Kramer's was fined six million dollars and charged 26 times for their actions. As a result, journalists began publishing concerns regarding the Deep Fake technology that could have an impact on the election results.

== Critique ==
Although media pranks may serve as legitimate criticism of the press, and artistic creations in their own right, they are often criticized not only for the disruption they cause but as simple publicity stunts that take advantage of the very failures of mass media that they ostensibly oppose. Skaggs has criticized the Flash mob movement, as being frivolous and lacking the countercultural element of more serious protest art.

== See also ==
- Media circus
- List of April Fool's Day jokes
- Culture jamming
- Silly season
- Situationist prank
