= Billboard hacking =

Illegal alteration of a billboard

Billboard hacking or billboard hijacking is the practice of altering a billboard without the consent of the owner. It may involve physically pasting new media over the existing image, or hacking into the system used to control electronic billboard displays. The aim is to replace the programmed video with a different video or image. The replaced media may be displayed for various reasons, including culture jamming, shock value, promotion, activism, political propaganda, or simply to amuse viewers.

== History ==
Billboard hacking started when commercial messages appeared in public space. In the first centuries BC, inscriptions promoting gladiatorial battles on the houses of the wealthiest in Pompeii commonly encountered passers-by who would inscribe their own humorous or insulting responses. The commercialisation of paint markers and spray paint in the 1960s helped popularise the practice. During May 1968 protests in Paris, protesters wrote over billboards to give voice to their messages.

A decade later, the first collectives of billboard hackers emerged. In San Francisco, the Billboard Liberation Front altered the meaning of a diverse range of billboards by selectively adding or removing words. In Sydney, the Billboard Utilising Graffitists Against Unhealthy Promotions, a collective of activists and medical professionals, used spray paint to alter the words and images of billboards promoting cigarettes and alcohol. In 1984, the art collective Frères Ripoulain collaborated with the American artist Keith Haring to paint over billboards on the platform of Metro Dupleix in Paris. The action is followed by an illicit exhibition on the platform.

== Self-promotion ==
A Russian daredevil group called Ontheroofs hacked into a billboard atop a skyscraper in Hong Kong, causing it to display the name of their organization, a video of a previous climb up the then unfinished Shanghai Tower, and the words "What's Up Hong Kong".

Two college students in Belgrade, Serbia hacked into a billboard and then contacted the owner describing the vulnerability. The hack allowed them to play Space Invaders and then display "Hacked4Fun". The students were thanked by the owner for pointing out the vulnerability and each given an iPad Mini.

In Republic Square, Belgrade, Serbia, hackers caused a billboard to display an advertisement for The Pirate Bay which read "First they ignore you, then they laugh at you, then they fight you, then you win."

== Activism ==
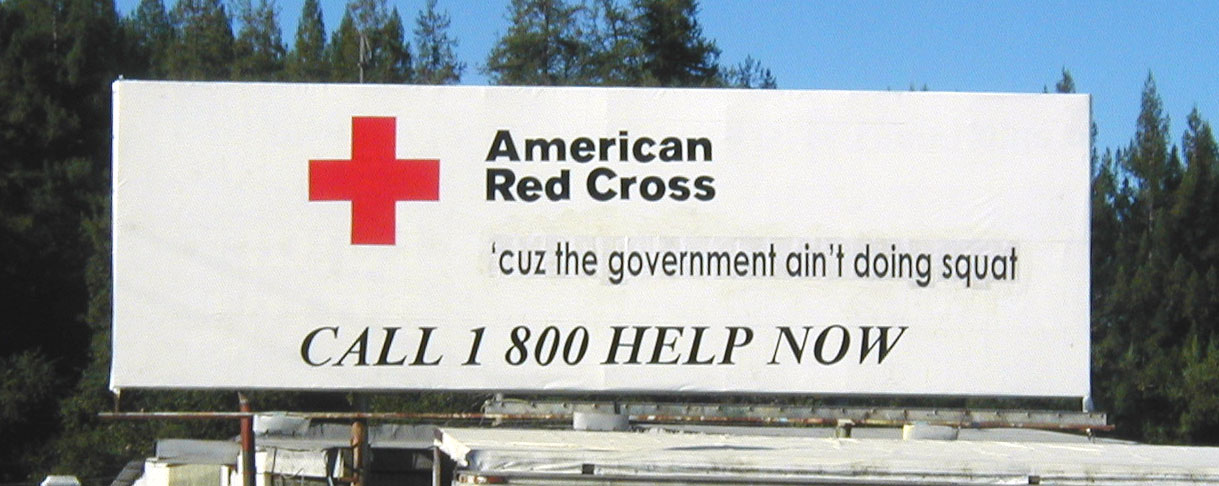
A billboard hijacked by the Billboard Liberation Front

A group named "Brandalism" has been hacking European billboards since 2012. Around November 2015, just prior to the Paris climate talks (COP21), street artists joined with this group and gained control of around 600 billboards around Paris making display the message "We'll keep on bribing politicians and emitting greenhouse gases" and a Volkswagen promotion reading "We're sorry that we got caught."

In London, students recreated film posters with Black leads and installed them in bus shelter advertising spaces. These posters sought to highlight the lack of Black representation in popular culture.

== Legal response ==
Depending on the circumstances, billboard hacking may be illegal. The FBI opened an investigation following the display of the obscene Goatse image on a billboard in Buckhead, Atlanta. In another instance, one man was sentenced to 18 months in prison for displaying pornography on a Moscow billboard. Non-electronic billboard hacks have rarely led to arrests. One study warned corporate clients that attempts to prosecute billboard hackers would likely cause more bad publicity than the original offence, and suggested the best response may be to "address any criticisms raised."

== Methods ==
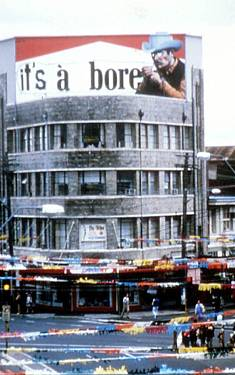
An example of hijacking using détournement

Control over the display of electronic billboards may be achieved by hacking. One possible way of doing this is by knowing the default password provided by the manufacturer as the customer may neglect to choose a new one. Another way of doing this is through SQL Injection. Manufacturers increasingly try to prevent billboard hacking by installing CCTV cameras or embedding anti-hacking features into the software and hardware of the billboard.

With non-electronic billboards, the image may simply be pasted over with a new image, or, the original image modified using the technique of détournement.

== See also ==
- Billboard Liberation Front
- Billboard Utilising Graffitists Against Unhealthy Promotions
- Brandalism
- Subvertising
