= BLF =

BLF may refer to:

- Bangladesh Liberation Front, also called Mujib Bahini
- Baluch Liberation Front
- Billboard Liberation Front
- Biographical Dictionary of Finland abbreviated BLF in Swedish from Biografiskt lexikon för Finland
- British Lung Foundation
- Brotherhood of Locomotive Firemen, forerunner of the Brotherhood of Locomotive Firemen and Enginemen in North America
- Bruce Lee Foundation
- Builders Labourers Federation in Australia
- Mercer County Airport (West Virginia); IATA airport code BLF
- Buol language of Indonesia (ISO code: blf)
- Black First Land First a pan-Africanist and revolutionary socialist political party in South Africa
- Blf, short for "Bluff"; a Street suffix as used in the US
