= Arthur Chesterfield-Evans =

Former Australian politician

Arthur Chesterfield-Evans FRCS
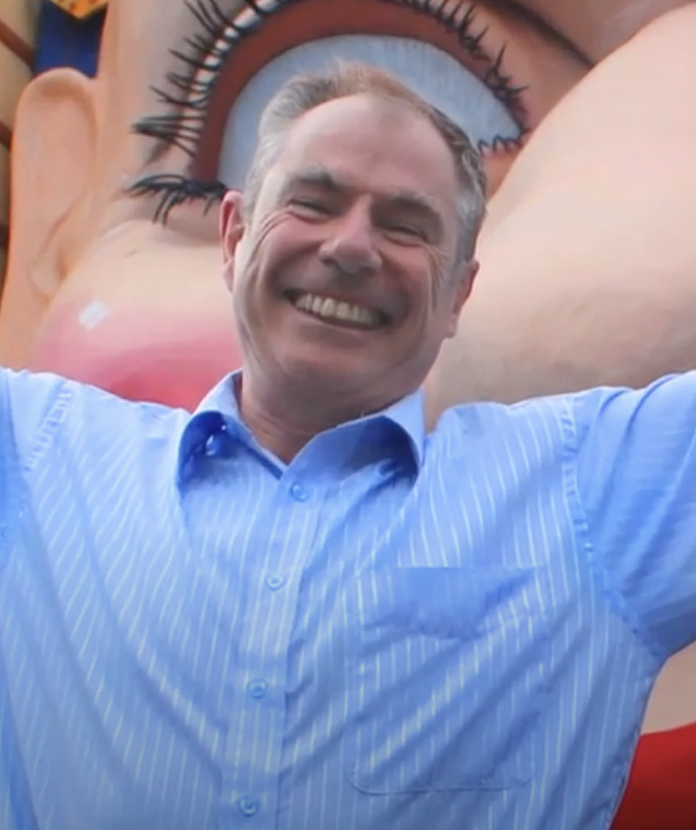
- Chesterfield-Evans in 2015

Member of the New South Wales Legislative Council
- In office 25 June 1998 – 2 April 2007
- Preceded by: Elisabeth Kirkby

Personal details
- Born: 16 June 1950 (age 76) Brisbane, Queensland, Australia
- Party: Greens (since 2015)
- Other political affiliations: Australian Democrats (1986−2015)
- Profession: Medical doctor

Arthur Chesterfield-Evans (born 16 June 1950) is an Australian medical practitioner and politician who served as a member of the Legislative Council of New South Wales from 1998 to 2007.

== Medical career ==
Graduated MB BS Sydney, 1975; FRCS (Eng) London, 1980, and MAppSc (OHS) University of NSW, 1996. Formerly surgical registrar, Royal North Shore Hospital, 1980–81; general practitioner in Sydney 1982 -3; occupational physician, Sydney Water, 1983–1994; postgraduate student (Masters by thesis) 1994; medical officer, Department of Veteran Affairs, 1995; occupational physician, self-employed, at Pacific OHS, Burwood 1995–8. In 1994, he served as the NSW President of the Doctors Reform Society of Australia, through which he argued for the continuation of Medicare and improvements to the public health system.

== Anti-tobacco activism ==
Chesterfield-Evans was president of the Non-Smokers Movement from 1984 to 1997 and a member of Billboard Utilising Graffitists Against Unhealthy Promotions (BUGA UP), which vandalised tobacco-advertising billboards with satirical graffiti. He was arrested and convicted over these activities but had his sentence remitted on appeal. He hosted an anti-tobacco radio program, Puff Off, from 1980 to 1994, and in 1988, the Drug and Alcohol Unit of TAFE produced an award-winning film of his activities, Confessions of a Simple Surgeon. He has also served on the Board of NADA (Network of Alcohol and Drug Agencies).

Chesterfield-Evans stood as an independent Senate candidate in New South Wales at the 1987 federal election, running on an anti-smoking platform.

== Peace activism ==
Chesterfield-Evans has been a leading Australian advocate for establishing a ministry or department of peace in Australia. The argument for the establishment of a ministry or department of peace from Chesterfield-Evans was that such a ministry or department would advocate for the implementation of peace-active policies, both at domestic and international levels, and act as a counter to the institutionalised power of violence. Just as we now recognise ministries or departments of the environment in the public policy formulation, so do we need ministries or departments of peace. Chesterfield-Evans spoke as an Australian delegate at the World Peace Forum in Canada in 2006 and at Social Issues Forums with the Centre for Peace and Social Justice of Southern Cross University in the same year.

== Political career ==
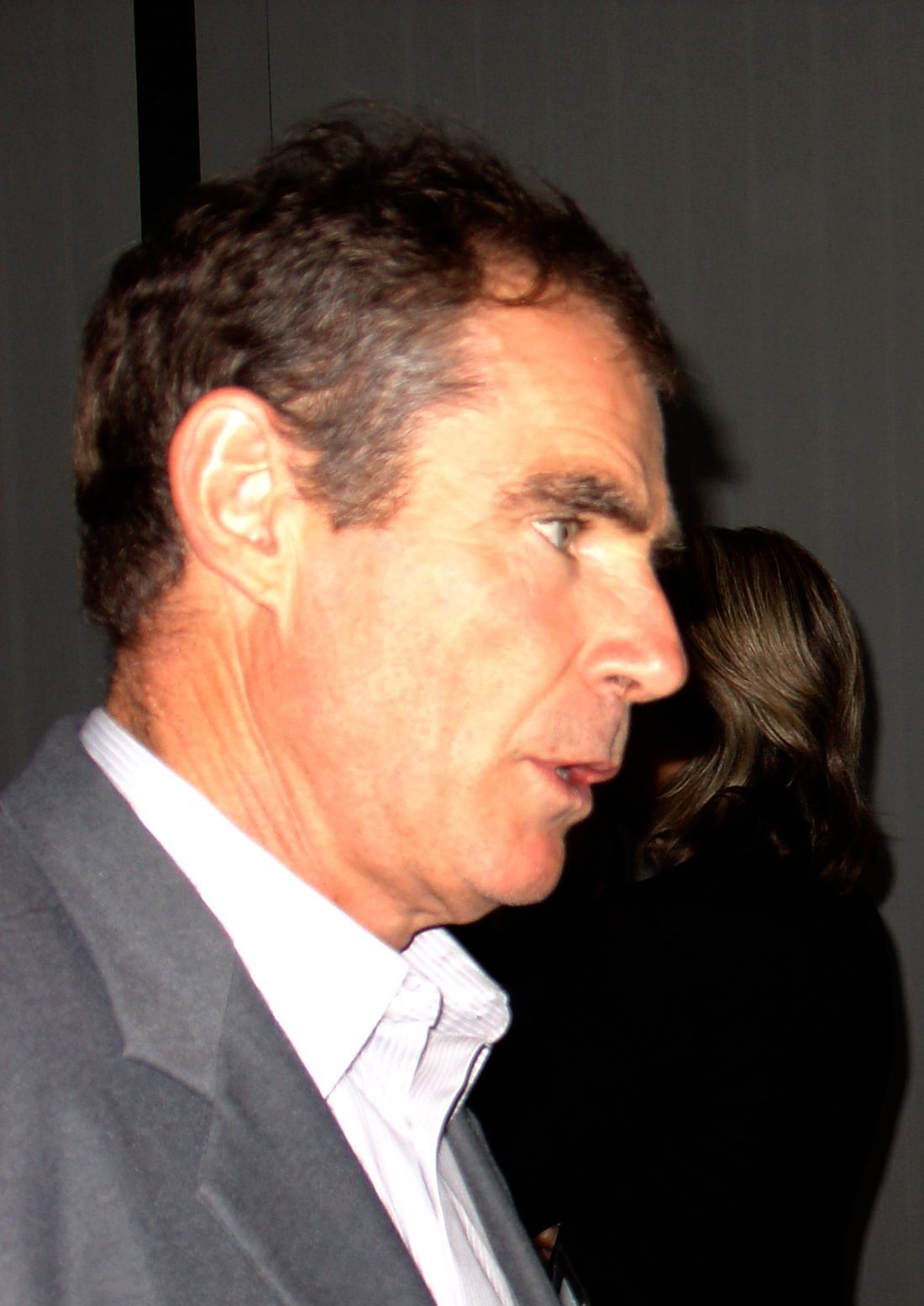
Chesterfield-Evans in 2008

Chesterfield-Evans joined the Australian Democrats in 1986 and was appointed to replace Elisabeth Kirkby in the New South Wales Legislative Council on her retirement on 25 June 1998. He was re-elected for an 8-year term in 1999 and was defeated at the 2007 election, achieving 1.8% of the primary vote, leaving the Democrats unrepresented in the NSW Parliament. As a parliamentarian, he was well known among journalists for his fashion sense, including liking yellow shirts.

With the eventual diminishment of the Australian Democrats, Chesterfield-Evans defected to the Greens, and at the 2015 New South Wales election, attempted to return to the NSW Parliament this time as the Greens candidate for the Legislative Assembly seat of North Shore but was unsuccessful. He was the Greens candidate for the 2015 North Sydney by-election, which was triggered by the resignation of Joe Hockey, however, he lost to Liberal candidate Trent Zimmerman.

== Family ==
He is married to Kate. They have a son, Mike.
