= Alfredo Lopez (activist) =

American writer (born 1949)

- Born: 1949 (age 76–77); Brooklyn, New York
- Citizenship: United States
- Occupation: Writer
- Movement: Socialism

Alfredo Jose Miguel Lopez (born 1949) is an activist, writer, media producer, teacher and organizer in Brooklyn, New York. He is an Internet activist and the co-director of May First/People Link, a progressive Internet users' organization.

Lopez is the author of six books and thousands of articles. He was a top leader of the Puerto Rican Socialist Party during the 1970s. The main organizer of the Day of Solidarity with Puerto Rico in Madison Square Garden, the largest demonstration of its type in history, and the 1976 Counter-Bicentennial. He coordinated the U.S. delegation to the International Solidarity Conference on Puerto Rico in 1975, the first international conference on the issue. And, during that same period, he edited the U.S. edition of the PSP newspaper Claridad.

During the 1990s, Lopez led a campaign to keep NYC public hospitals from being privatized. He has participated in organizing and leading similar campaigns over his 40 years of activism. He is a founder of The Brooklyn New School as alternative school in Brooklyn. In 2007, was an organizer of the technology group for the United States Social Forum.

== Publications ==
Beginning with his publication of "The Case of Carlos Feliciano" (1971) and then the ground-breaking Puerto Rican Papers (Bobbs-Merrill, 1973), Lopez has published in a variety of media almost continuously. He has written two mystery novels: Turn Around Once, Then Keep Running and Kings of Crotona Park (both published by EntreMundos Publications). He is probably best known for his history of Puerto Rico, Doña Licha's Island (South End Press) and the more recent The Organic Internet - Organizing History's Largest Social Movement.

He has published for a wide variety of publications including The Village Voice, Seven Days (at which he was an editor) and he worked for eight years as a reporter at the (Bergen) Record.

Lopez has produced two weekly radio programs and a weekly television show (CityLook) broadcast in New York during the late 1980s from union local He has produced six documentaries. He was an editor of the news magazine Seven Days (1980) and has written hundreds of articles.

Lopez has taught at many colleges and Universities over the years most notably Columbia University (at the Graduate School of Journalism) and several colleges in the City University of New York system (John Jay, Lehman, Hunter College) and has lectured extensively nationwide.

In 1994, Lopez launched People Link, a progressive Internet provider which has been in continuous existence since then and merged, in 2006, with members of the former May First Technology Collective to create May First/People Link. That organization, with over 500 members, is the largest Internet membership organization in the United States and generally considered the predominant progressive Internet provider.

== See also ==
- List of Puerto Rican writers
- List of Puerto Ricans
- Puerto Rican literature
