= Paul Conneally =

British artist

Paul Terence Conneally (born 1959 in Sheffield, United Kingdom) is a poet, artist and musician based in Loughborough, UK.

== Poetry and art ==
Artwork part of Conneally project

In the field of poetry Conneally is best known for his haiku and haiku-related forms including haibun and renga/renku. His definition of haibun is quoted among others on the Contemporary Haibun Online website. He ran the Haikumania Project, (hosted on the website of The Center for Digital Discourse and Culture at Virginia Tech) where some of his work and others is showcased.

Known for collaborative works based on Japanese renga, he has been published and translated. Conneally's projects include hypertext works resulting out of actions initiated by Conneally and others via the internet and in the real world. Conneally's work in bringing linked haikai based works to the internet is mentioned in Currents in Electronic Literacy Fall 2001.

Conneally leads live renga sessions across the UK and has explored the form and process alongside other UK artist poets including Alec Finlay, Gavin Wade, Gerry Loose and Anne-Marie Culhane.

In 2002, Conneally was the director of the first Global Haiku Tournament which was organised by the World Haiku Club. The Japan Times sponsored and presented awards to winners

Conneally is associated with the modern Situationist movement through psychogeography, social intervention and literary detournement, both alone and in collaboration with others. This often involves making art in people's local environment, such as encouraging the creation of haiku or renga whilst walking, a modern take on the ginko or 'haiku walk' common in Japan or making poems in and about parts of the local cityscape, and adding them to the environment. Along with Finlay and Culhane, Conneally experiments with renga to produce psychogeographic maps that incorporate haiku and other poetic texts.

Conneally has been described by the Embassy of Japan in the UK as an "experienced expert" in the field of haiku and led haiku workshops for teachers on behalf of the embassy and Japan 21.

Conneally has worked extensively with schools and community groups all over the UK, encouraging them to make poetry through interacting with their local and wider environment. The poems he has encouraged pupils to create have been critically acclaimed. A teacher's resource film for English called Digital Haiku documents and presents work undertaken by Conneally with young people in rural Shropshire. The Poetry Society has listed a number of workshops / intervention pieces by Conneally as 'poetry landmarks'

Conneally has worked with a number of UK museums to encourage the use of poetry including haiku, tanka and other forms to encourage new interactions and interpretations of museum exhibits. His spell as haiku poet in residence in the 'Parade of Life' ukiyo-e (Japanese woodblock prints) exhibition at Bristol Museum and Art Gallery as part of the Japan 21 celebrations part-funded by the Japanese Government led to the publication of Parade of Life: Poems inspired by Japanese Prints featuring Japanese woodblock prints alongside haiku written by children and visitors to the museum in workshop with Conneally and co-edited by former British Haiku Society Secretary and haiku poet Alan Summers. The book had launches in Bristol, UK and Akita, Japan.

His work with school children to produce museum labels for artefacts on the SS Great Britain in the form of tanka, mesostic poems and riddles is featured on the Teachers' TV channel being used in a classroom by a teacher as an example of model practice in interpreting artefacts.

Increasingly his work sees him working in more diverse artistic forms alongside other artists to make collaborative and solo works in the visual and performance fields as well as texts. In his ongoing piece Walk to Work Conneally transposes the 'walks to work' of individual workers to other places to form the basis of psychogeographic explorations. Walk to Work includes the INVIGILATOR series which has been performed in The New Forest (UK), Derby (UK), Tokyo (Japan), Nuneaton (UK) and Digbeth (UK)

Involuntary Painting is a Facebook page that he co created on April 1, 2013 with the artist Millree Hughes (who invented the term) where members can share photographs of events in the world such as splashed paint on walls, partly erased graffiti, mold, damaged street markings, rust, adhesive residue, snail tracks etc etc that came together in a way that remind the viewer of a modern Painting. The posts on the page are Involuntary Paintings.

He has been associated with UK arts organisation, Charnwood Arts, which is a registered charity based in the East Midlands. 2009 saw the publication of 'The Sound of Water' coming out of an almost year-long psychogeographic haiku exploration of Thurmaston with the people of Thurmaston themselves resulting in both a book and haiku 'fragments' cut into metal sculptures, wall hangings and benches made by sculptor Richard Thornton throughout a new housing development 'Watermead' built in Thurmaston 2009.

Paul Conneally has edited columns in various poetry journals, including World Haiku Review and Simply Haiku.

== Publications ==
- Parade of Life: Poems inspired by Japanese Prints, selected by Conneally and Alan Summers. Poetry Can, ISBN 0-9539234-2-8
- 100 Verses for 3 Estates, a renga word-map of King's Norton, by Conneally, Alec Finlay and others. Published by Strategic Questions, Commissioned by Birmingham City Council. ISBN 978-0-9551611-9-3
- The Sound of Water : A Haiku Poetry Project, Published by Charnwood Arts Feb 2009, ISBN 978-1-903947-24-3
- Digital Haiku Teacher resource and video published by Rural Media

== Music ==
Conneally was a member of UK post-punk DIY band Dum Dum Dum (1978 – 1981?). The band have gained recent notoriety with tracks from their UK DIY post-punk EP rereleased as part of the US Hyped-to-Death record label's Messthetics series including on the widely acclaimed Best of Messthetics album. He also wrote and sang with Iguana Brothers and Bastinado Step. Both bands toured widely and made several national TV appearances. In 2003 Conneally co-wrote the song "The Rainfall" for house music act 7HQ, which was a top twenty dance chart track. in the UK journal Music Week.

Conneally currently performs as Little Onion and in 2018 released new albums and singles both as a solo artist and with the bands Bred Pudding and Anglo Japanese outfit Giant Glove.
