= Lord Bloody Wog Rolo =

Australian activist and eccentric (1945-2007)

Rolo Mestman Tapier
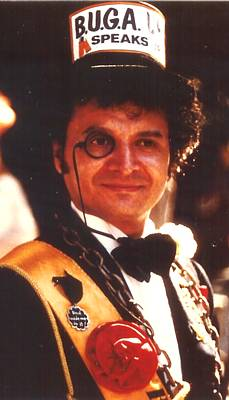
- Born: Alberto Rolando Yapur; 1 July 1945; San Miguel de Tucumán, Argentina
- Died: 3 December 2007 (aged 62); New Norfolk, Tasmania, Australia
- Occupation: Electrical engineer
- Spouse: Rosalyn Anderson (Lady Bloody Wog Rolo) (m. 1985; div. 1991)

Rolo Mestman Tapier (1 July 1945 – 3 December 2007) otherwise known as Lord Bloody Wog Rolo was an activist and colourful eccentric Sydney identity. He initially achieved notoriety for his anti-monarchist statements and activities and became one of the early members of BUGAUP (Billboard Utilising Graffitists Against Unhealthy Promotions). His provocative and sometimes confrontational manner, particularly with police, saw him detained or arrested on minor charges a number of times.

== Rolo the Anti-Monarchist ==
Argentine-born Rolo first came to the attention of the Sydney community in 1979 when he renounced his pledge of allegiance to the Queen immediately following his immigration citizenship ceremony on the grounds that he was a republican and the Queen was not a democratically elected representative of the people. The renunciation caused a furore. Many sections of the community, including the RSL, called for his deportation.

Rolo was arrested during the 1981 Australia Day parade and charged with "behaviour likely to cause serious alarm and affront". He was wearing a sandwich board bearing anti-monarchist slogans such as "Abolish the Monarchy" and "Royalists are kow-towing colonialists suffering from an inferiority complex" and an offer to argue the topic with anyone who cared to pay 20 cents for the privilege. The magistrate dismissed the charge against him at the request of Rolo's barrister Wayne Flynn who had been hired by the NSW Council for Civil Liberties.

Later in 1981, Rolo publicly apologised and said he had finally seen the error of his ways. He claimed he now saw that the Monarchy was the best system for Australia and to make amends he changed his name by deed poll to Lord Bloody Wog Rolo, to provide a service between Royal visits for those who wanted to curtsey and pay homage to royalty. He stated he was so adamant that the monarchical system was the best that he proposed all Australian-born children should also swear allegiance to the crown and be deported if they refused.

== Rolo takes on the NSW Police ==
Rolo's slogan-daubed car was a regular sight in the streets of Sydney, with protests of everything from smoking to royalty to religion, but conspicuously, no anti-police slogans on the vehicle. However, never one to back down from an opportunity to provoke, Rolo then added the ambiguous "Pigs are definitely not Kosher" and the less ambiguous "Support honest police, they both need you". He stated the Police harassment made him more determined to continue his antics. "I left Argentina because it is run by a police-military fascist regime. I thought Australia was the land of democracy, but since I began speaking out about things I think are wrong, I've found Australia is becoming a police state".

In September 1982, Rolo advertised his now notorious vehicle for sale at $1,500 with a $200 discount if the purchaser agreed not to remove the slogans for one full year and drive it on the roads.

Since Rolo had officially changed his name by deed poll, although reluctant to do so, the police had no choice but to charge Rolo using his full legal name. In a loud voice the court officer would walk among the crowd outside the court calling "Lord Bloody Wog Rolo, Lord Bloody Wog Rolo, Lord Bloody Wog Rolo." Rolo would then acknowledge his presence, and walk into the court room (decked out in full royal regalia) and the court officer would announce his presence thus "Lord Bloody Wog Rolo is before the court, Your Worship", much to Rolo's satisfaction and the amusement of the public gallery.

== BUGAUP ==
Demonstration at the NSW Art Gallery

Rolo first became a BUGAUP activist around 1980/81 after a run-in with Coles supermarkets which were trial marketing a shopping bag adorned with cigarette advertising at their Chatswood store. When Rolo noticed his purchases had been put into bags promoting Peter Jackson cigarettes, he cancelled the sale and left the store, loudly voicing his disapproval and disgust.

The next day, he and another like-minded friend mounted an attack on the store. Both men piled their trolleys high, waited until the checkout operator had keyed in the items (no scanning in those days), then refused to take them away in the Peter Jackson bags. Just as the Manager was called to remonstrate with the first person, the second hit another checkout with the same tactic. The inconvenience made the trial a total failure and the whole of Australia was spared cigarette ads on checkout bags.

In 1984, Rolo and fellow BUGAUP member Ric Bolzan appeared before the District Court, charged with allegedly damaging a Formula One racing car on display in the NSW Art Gallery in 1982. Bolzan chained himself to the vehicle and Rolo encouraged bystanders to sprinkle it with cigarette butts supplied for the event. The car, owned by Alfa Romeo, was part of a display at the gallery sponsored by Philip Morris, and was emblazoned with advertisements for Marlboro cigarettes. The jury took one and a half hours to reach its verdict and Rolo was convicted on a charge of maliciously injuring the racing car. Rolo was fined $75 but as was the practice of BUGAUP members, elected not to pay the fine imposed by Judge Jane Mathews, choosing instead to spend three days "as a guest of Her Majesty" at Long Bay Gaol.

== Personal life ==
He was born Alberto Rolando Yapur on 1 July 1945 in San Miguel de Tucumán (Argentina). Rolo's mother was of Ukrainian descent and his father was a Roman Catholic. As a child Rolo was fascinated by electronics and when he was about 12, set up a small business selling radios which he made himself. Rolo's love and fascination of electronics lasted his entire life.

After his National Service obligation was served as a para-trooper, Rolo studied and qualified as an electronics engineer. In 1970 Rolo emigrated to Australia, setting up home in Sydney, Australia.

In March 1985, Rolo married fellow BUGAUP activist Rosalyn Anderson, who became Lady Bloody Wog Rolo. They have two sons: Alex born 1986 and Robin born 1988. They divorced in 1991. In 2000, Rolo changed his name to Rolo Mestman Tapier to match the name his sons were using.

In 1986 Rolo designed and manufactured an automobile alarm that was rated highest out of ten auto alarms evaluated by the Australian Consumers' Association in a trial conducted in 1987. The results were published in the March 1988 edition of Choice magazine. Even his car alarm caused controversy as United Artists Corporation filed an application to oppose the registration of Rolo's trademark "Black Panther". UAC did not state the grounds for their opposition, only that they were the owners of the Pink Panther character. The Black Panther logo was drawn by Sydney artist Kevin McKay and featured a cartoon depicting a black panther leaning against an automobile. United Artists did not provide evidence of support and their opposition application eventually lapsed and the trademark was duly registered. The trademark has since lapsed.

== Death ==
In May 2006, Rolo suffered a heart attack which resulted in his undergoing a septuple coronary bypass operation. In September 2006, doctors discovered Rolo had renal cell carcinoma (kidney cancer) which had metastasised to his lymph nodes, liver and lungs. As the cancer had advanced beyond a curative stage, rather than undergo debilitating medical treatment, Rolo elected to let nature take its course and lived his last months in relative peace and contentment. He died 15 months later on 3 December 2007. Rolo is buried at the Malbina Lawn Cemetery, Sorell Creek, Tasmania.
