= Bill Snow =

Australian anti-smoking activist

Bill (Billy) Snow
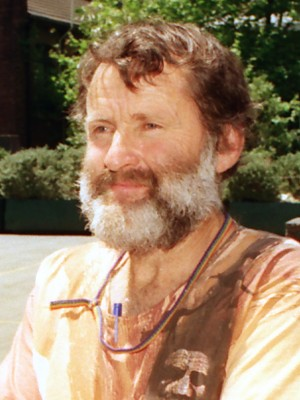
- Anti-Smoking Activist, Graffitist
- Born: 31 January 1938; Sydney Australia
- Died: 8 March 2018 (aged 80); Sutherland, Sydney, Australia
- Occupations: Printer, Graffitist
- Years active: 1977-2018
- Spouse: Rosemarie Gosling (m. 1967; div. 1975)
- Children: Emily Snow
- Parent(s): Lyall Snow and Alison Snow (nee Munro)

William Snow , known as Bill or Billy, was an anti-smoking activist in Australia. In addition to his anti-smoking activities with BUGA UP, he was an avid campaigner against nuclear weapons and destruction of the environment and was a strong supporter of Aboriginal Rights.

== Early life ==
William Snow was born on 31 January 1938.

While living in Bundeena, he was contracted by the University of Sydney to print testamurs for graduating students and acquired a hand-operated letterpress printing machine to print them. This printing method was preferred because the typed letters were embossed into the paper. Snow continued to print the testamurs until the technology was superseded by laser printing in the 1990s.

== Activism ==
Snow was one of Australia's early environmental and fresh air campaigners. When a fellow anti-smoking campaigner, Brian McBride, sued a bus driver for assaulting him with tobacco smoke on a non-smoking bus, Bill and Gayle Russell came forward in his support. This action led to the formation of the Non-Smokers Rights Movement in 1978, later to become the Non Smokers Movement of Australia.

Snow travelled in his van with 'BUGA UP Rules OK' painted on the front, while rainbows and dolphin motifs were painted on the sides by his partner and fellow graffitist Danielle Kluth. This mobile display helped to publicise his environmental causes. He drove around with spray cans and a bucket with paint bombs floating in it.

His anti-smoking actions took many forms: for example he collected cigarette butts from sacred sites and elsewhere, put them in large plastic bottles with labels like “Collected at Ayers Rock” (Uluru) with information about how much damage they did to wildlife, and set up displays at fairs and schools to increase awareness and encourage action against tobacco and environmental pollution. He was an engaging character, though not always tactful and sometimes plain cantankerous. He would confront tobacco company salespeople and other representatives and then engage them about the error of their ways. His van was used as a 'BUGA UP Embassy' outside Leo Burnett’s (tobacco) Advertising Agency in North Sydney in 1984.

He was arrested and spent time in jail for his billboard graffiti, as naturally he refused to pay the fine. But the fact that this happened made BUGA UP the most radical health promotion group in the world, which served to make all other anti-tobacco actions moderate, and re-frame the debate globally.

== Filmography ==
- Billboard Bandits A short History of B.U.G.A. U.P. by Kathyn Milliss

== See also ==
- Billboard Utilising Graffitists Against Unhealthy Promotions
