= Civic Joy Fucks =

- Civic Joy Fucks performing at El Rio on October 30, 2026

Background information
- Origin: San Francisco
- Genre: Punk rock
- Years active: 2026–present
- Website: https://thecivicjoyfucks.bandcamp.com/

Civic Joy Fucks is a satirical American punk rock band from San Francisco whose three members perform wearing character masks to depict Mayor Daniel Lurie, tech investor Chris Larsen, and local politico Manny Yekutiel.

== Music ==
The band’s music satirizes the three San Francisco figures' moderate political views with songs like "Cameras Everywhere," in reference to the city's use of Flock cameras, and "We Love Police."

== Name ==
The band’s name is a reference to Lurie and Yekutiel's Civic Joy Fund, a philanthropic effort that raised private funds for arts and volunteer-focused projects.

== Guerilla art ==
The band has also installed guerrilla ads in San Francisco bus stops parodying AI company ads, in collaboration with artist collective Upcycled Brigade. One such poster read, “We hope you die cold and alone on the streets after our AI employee replaces you, you piece of shit.”
