= Jorge Rodriguez-Gerada =

Cuban-American artist

Jorge Rodríguez-Gerada
- Born: 5 February 1966 (age 59); Santa Clara, Cuba
- Education: Jersey City State College
- Notable work: Culture jamming (1989–1997); Identity Series (2002–present); Expectation (2008); Out of Many, One (2014)
- Movement: Culture jamming and fine street
- Website: www.gerada-art.com

Jorge Rodríguez-Gerada is a Cuban-American contemporary artist. He was born in Cuba on February 5, 1966, and emigrated with his family to the United States in 1970.

He predominantly creates work in urban spaces on a large scale. He was a founding member of the early 1990s New York culture jamming movement, working first with the group Artfux and later with the Cicada Corps of Artists. During this period, he also launched interventions on billboards and public advertising.

In 2002, Rodríguez-Gerada moved to Barcelona, where he worked on his ephemeral charcoal drawings, which comprise his Identity Series. He then developed the Terrestrial Series; it is a series of ephemeral earthworks. Since 2009, he has curated the annual AvantGuard Urbano Festival, an art festival held in Tudela, Navarre, in Northern Spain. He also takes part in numerous shows and exhibitions.

== Early years ==
Jorge Rodríguez-Gerada immigrated with his family from Cuba to the United States in 1970 to settle in North Plainfield, New Jersey. As a Hispanic immigrant enrolled in a local school, he was bullied there for being Spanish. As a child, he was interested in drawing. Since the age of sixteen, he started spending time in Manhattan.

He studied at Jersey City State College (now New Jersey City University) where he met the future members of Artfux.

== Culture jamming ==
Artfux started by illegally altering billboards and staging socially charged street actions and performances. They targeted the 'damaging products' (such as drunk beverages and menthol cigarette brands) being advertised in the areas. Reverend Calvin O. Butts took his parishioners on 'bill-board busting' missions, and they would paint over the cigarette or alcohol advertisements around their church with white paint.

Rodríguez-Gerada, with Artfux, started to turn them into political messages of their own with 'clever/cute' interventions. Rodríguez-Gerada would morph the faces of cigarette models so they looked diseased. He then replaced the standard Surgeon General's warning with his own messages: "Struggle General’s warning: Black and Latinos are the prime scapegoats for illegal drugs, and the prime target for legal ones". As a culture jammer, he used the pseudonym Artjammer.

Following the breakup of Artfux, Rodríguez-Gerada joined the Cicada Crops of artists, with whom he continued to culture jam. He soon extended his critiques beyond tobacco and alcohol ads to include rampant ad bombardment and commercialism in general. In 1997, when Klein interviewed Jorge Rodríguez-Gerada, he said that he started to alter street signs as well.

== Identity Series ==
In 2002, around the time that Jorge Rodríguez-Gerada moved to Barcelona, he began to create large charcoal portrait drawings of anonymous locals. It is directed towards social issues instead of advertising.

=== Identity Composite Series ===
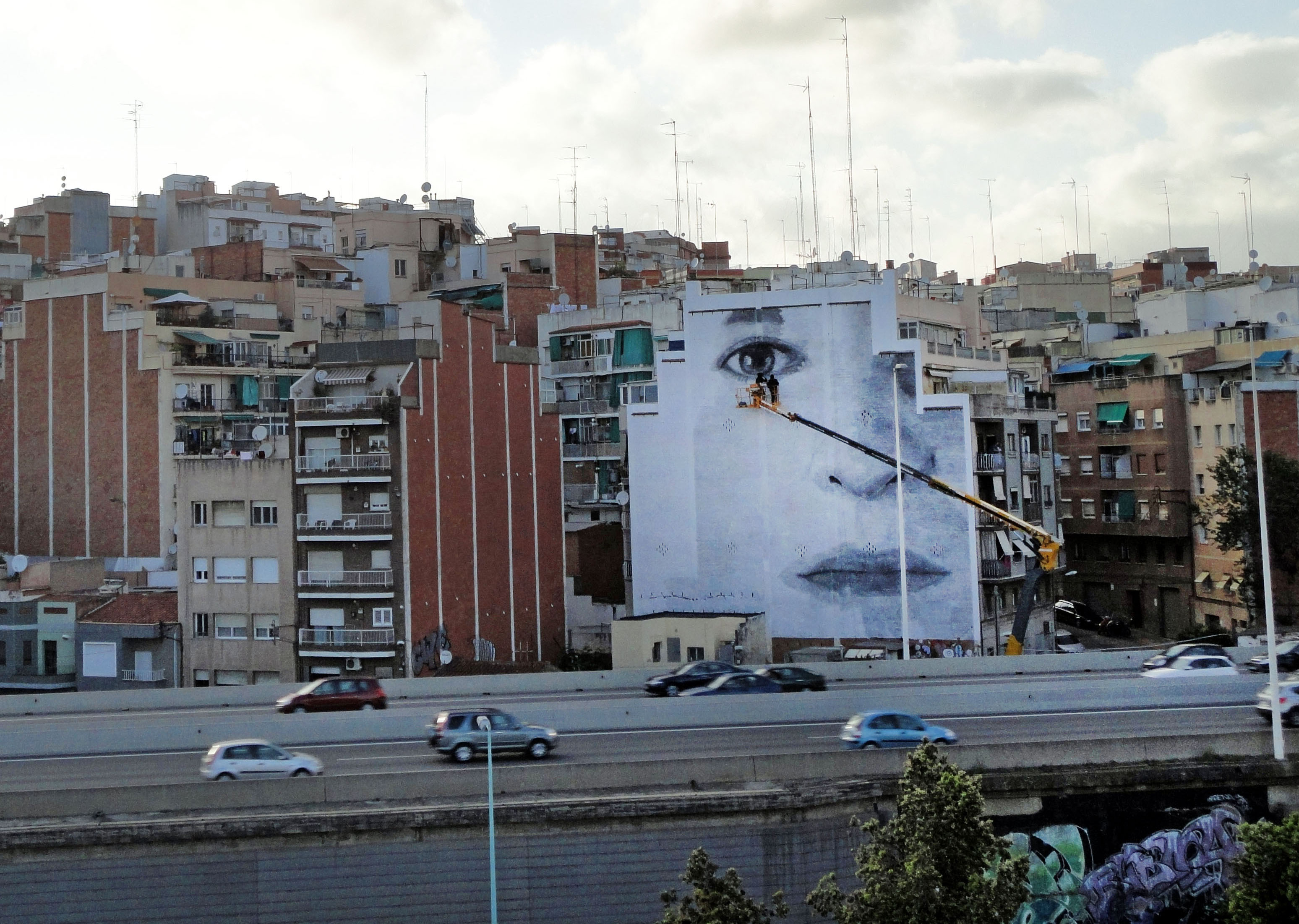
Composite Identity mural

Complementary to the Identity Series. With help from the Autonomous University of Barcelona, he created the composite face of the demographics of a city based on multiple 3D facial scans. He created a composite identity based on 100 faces in the demographics of that area in 2009. The resultant portrait was drawn in charcoal on an exterior wall surface in the area.

In 2010, he created an Identity Composite for Badalona, Spain, using 3D scans of 34 faces of the neighbourhoods. It too became a charcoal portrait. Rodríguez-Gerada stated that he hoped to use the project to create monumental sculptures as well as murals that "mirror each location's idiosyncrasy and population".

== Memorylithics ==
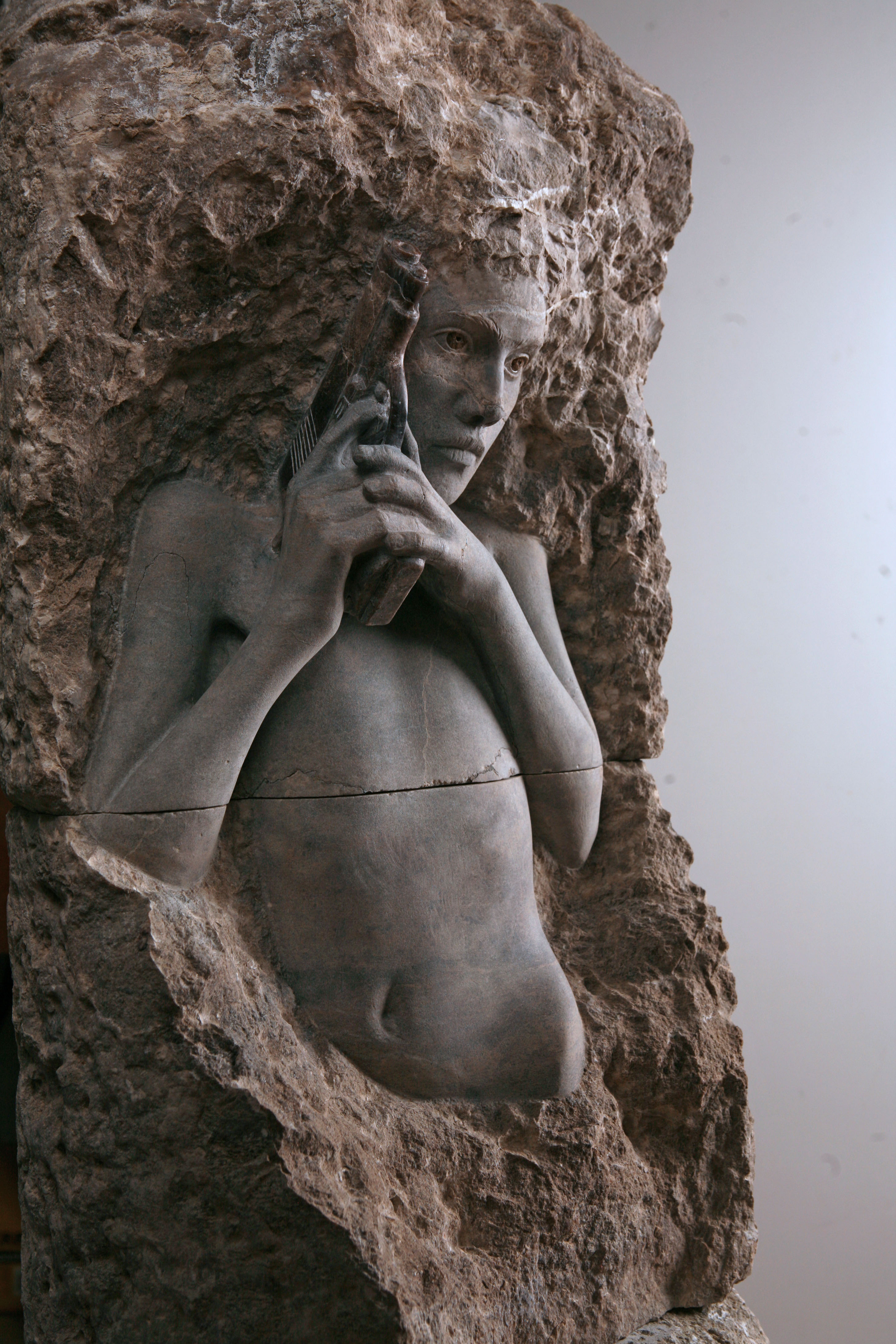
Pillar of Socierty II – Memorylithics Series

Memorylithics is a sculpture series made using old architectural elements such as stone and bricks. The finished piece involves the history of the found materials used to create it.

== Terrestrial Series ==
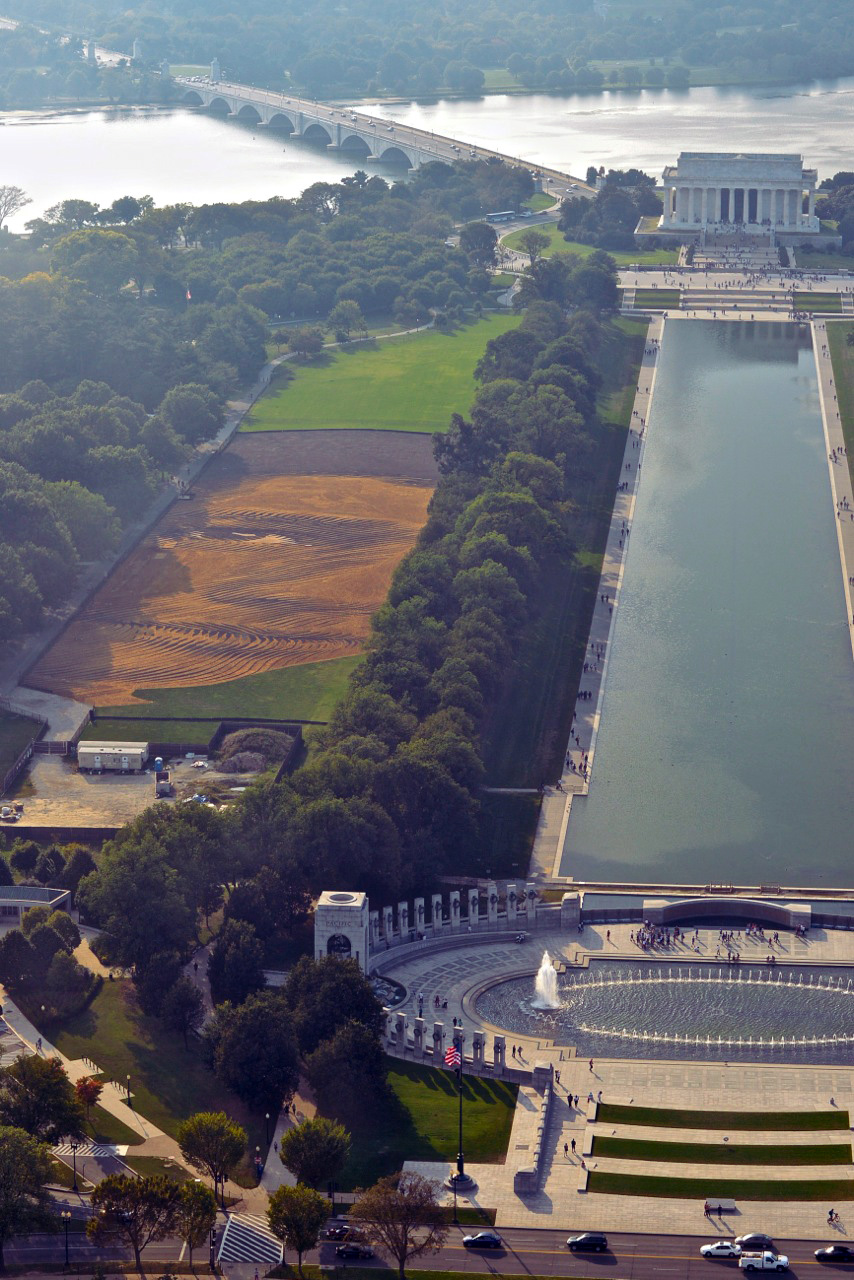
Out of Many, One in Washington, DC.

Rodríguez-Gerada's earthworks are ephemeral. Each work is put together using a vector image and GPS technology.

=== Expectation ===
Jorge Rodríguez-Gerada's first terrestrial work was Expectation, which is an ephemeral sand portrait of Barack Obama on a beachfront in Barcelona, Spain. It was designed to be viewed from space. On November 3, 2008, the day before the U.S. elections, the Expectation project was presented at a press conference in Barcelona. The work was created using a vector graph and approximately 650 tons of sand and gravel covering an area 120 by 80 metre wide. It was completed by volunteers who work despite weather conditions. It was administered by the Forum de las Culturas, Barcelona.

Rodríguez-Gerada said that having it made from sand and gravel was like making a giant mandala to pray for change but also alludes to how the hope could fade away; the sand eventually did erode away.

=== Homage to Enric Miralles ===
To commemorate the Catalan architect Enric Miralles on the tenth anniversary of his death, Rodríguez-Gerada created a portrait of his face using sand in Barcelona, which was then undone on July 3, 2010. It was a giant mandala.

=== GAL-LA ===
The GAL-LA project was created as part of the first planetary art exhibit eARTh that was curated by 350.org. Each of its pieces was created to highlight issues related to climate change in response to the 2010 United Nations Climate Change Conference in Cancún, Mexico. The number 350 refers to the parts per million carbon dioxide reduction targets proposed by scientists to combat climate change. It was designed as a sun stencil.

Rodríguez-Gerada chose a girl named Gal-la who lives in the Delta del Ebro and created this icon in her likeness: "an icon to symbolize all the reasons for the world to act today". Her portrait was constructed using a labyrinth design. Gal-La was chosen to be included on day 96 in Vivienne Westwood's online installations collection of 100 days of Active Resistance.

=== Mama Cash ===
For the Mama Cash project, Rodríguez-Gerada created a portrait of the face of a feminist activist, spanning almost two football fields on Zeeburghereiland, Amsterdam, in winter 2012. With the help of 80 volunteers, the face was constructed in under a week using almost five miles of rope, seven tons of straw, 5300 cubic feet of soil, and 1150 wooden poles. The portrait was to remain for one year.

=== Wish ===
As Belfast Festival at Queen's first artist in residence, Rodríguez-Gerada created the portrait Wish in October 2013. The ephemeral portrait of a young girl making a wish covers eleven acres of the Titanic Quarter of Belfast. The portrait is based on a photo of an anonymous six-year-old girl from Belfast. Approximately 30,000 wooden pegs, 2000 tons of soil, and 2000 tons of sand were used to make the portrait. Wish took eighteen months to plan and one month to execute.

=== Out of Many, One ===
Out of Many, One is a "facescape" created on commission for The Smithsonian's National Portrait Gallery at the National Mall in Washington, D.C., and inaugurated on October 1, 2014. The piece measures six acres and is located between the World War II Memorial and Lincoln Memorial. It was made using 2000 tons of sand, 800 tons of soil, 10,000 wooden pegs, and 8 miles of string. The temporary piece was opened to the public in October 2014.

The portrait is a composite portrait created by photographing numerous young men of different ethnic backgrounds at the National Mall. The title, Out of Many, One, is translated from the Latin E pluribus unum, a phrase on the Seal of the United States.

== Bibliography ==
- Blackshaw, Farrelly, Ric, Liz, The Street Art Book, 60 Artists in their own words, New York, HarperCollins, 2008
- Gavin, Francesca, Street Renegades: New Underground Street Art, London, Lawrence King publishing Ltd, 2007
- Klein, Naomi, No Logo, London, Fourth Estate, 2010
- Scott, Thomas, Designing Obama: A Chronicle of Art and Design from the 2008 Presidential Campaign, U.S.A, thepostpress.com, 2010,
- Westwood, Vivienne, 100 Days of Active Resistance, Bologne, Grafiche Damiane, 2011
