= Billboard Liberation Front =

Culture jamming artistic collective

- Abbreviation: BLF
- Formation: December 25, 1977; 48 years ago
- Founded at: San Francisco, California
- Type: Artistic collective
- Legal status: Active
- Purpose: Culture jamming, anti-corporate activism
- Headquarters: San Francisco, California
- Methods: Billboard modification
- Key people: Jack Napier; Irving Glikk; Simon Wagstaff; John Law; Gary Warne
- Parent organization: Suicide Club (initially)
- Affiliations: Guerrilla Girls, monochrom, Joey Skaggs
- Website: www.billboardliberation.com

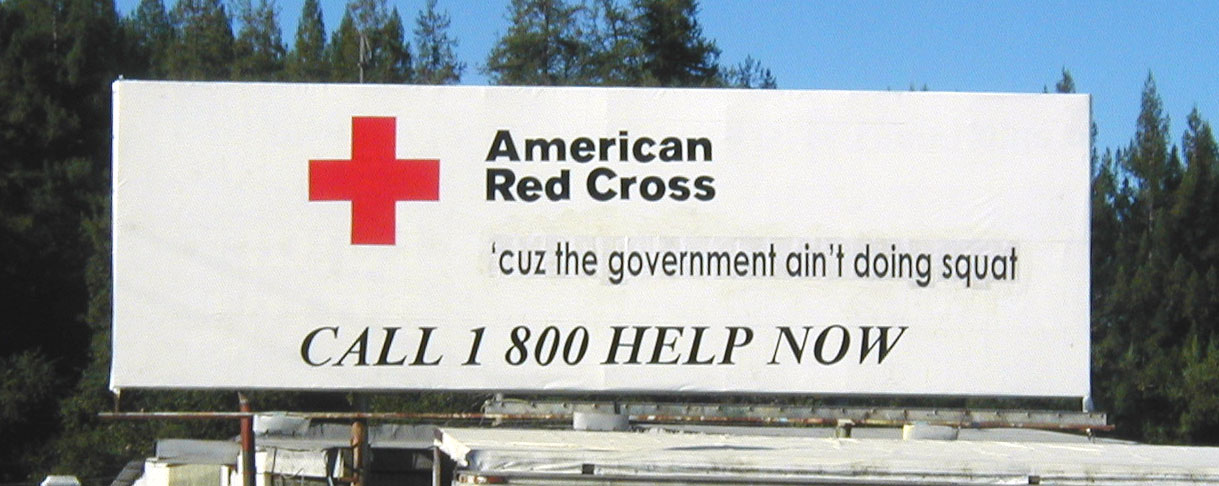
Example work, post-Hurricane Katrina.

The Billboard Liberation Front practices culture jamming via altering billboards by changing key words to radically alter the message, often to an anti-corporate message. It started in San Francisco in 1977.

Advertising executives informed Jill Posener, author of Spray it Loud (1982), that the executives designed billboards to attract attacks because the changes drew attention to the products. The BLF were aware of this possibility and considered invoicing advertisers including Chiat Day for the BLF's work.

In 2013, Complex Magazine named the BLF #27 of The 50 Most Influential Street Artists of All Time.

== See also ==
- Billboard Utilising Graffitists Against Unhealthy Promotions
- John Law — one of the known members
