= Doppelgänger brand image =

Parody logo highlighting ethical isssues

"Hacker Inside", a parody of the Intel inside logo

A doppelgänger brand image is a parody logo or narrative intended to highlight ethical issues regarding the product advertised. They are commonly associated with the brand's lack of authenticity, and most are created as a form of individual protest, either posted digitally on social media, or displayed as physical graffiti.

A 2012 study concluded that doppelgänger brand images were able to negatively affect sales, because they created a perception of mistrust in the minds of the customers. A 2006 study concluded that doppelgängers have an impact on the emotional brand image of a brand.

In a 2006 paper, Craig J. Thompson, Aric Rindfleisch and Zeynep Arsel suggest that doppelgänger brand images are a sign that "an emotional-branding story is beginning to lose its cultural resonance" and can be useful as a warning symptom.

== Examples ==
- The "Joe Chemo" campaign, an internet campaign created by an organization called Adbusters, criticized the product message of Camel cigarettes, and emphasized the harmful effects of smoking, by depicting the company's camel mascot as "a camel who wishes he'd never smoked cigarettes". In this doppelganger image the confident, cool and popular Joe Camel is replaced by this sick, depressed and lonely Joe Chemo. Shortly after this doppelganger campaign began, Joe Camel was withdrawn from the market.
- In 2015, a designer reinterpreted the Pepsi logo to represent a corpulent man. The intention was to emphasize the direct relation between consumption of sweetened soft drinks and obesity.
- After General Motors launched the Hummer H2 in the mid-2000s, a creative viral Internet campaign called "FUH2" began. This campaign concentrated not only on the brand itself, but also on its owners who were portrayed as savages who cared about style more than the environment.
- During Donald Trump's 2016 presidential campaign, comedian John Oliver satirised Trump's "Make America Great Again" slogan on his show Last Week Tonight, with the parody "Make Donald Drumpf Again", referring to Trump's distant ancestral surname.
- Nike's logo and slogan ("Just do it") appear in several images either altered or adjusted, often highlighting the company's use of sweat shop labor.
- Following the BP oil spill in the Gulf of Mexico in 2010, several satirical logos reflecting a negative image were born out of a contest sponsored by Greenpeace.
- The South Butt was an attempt to commercialize a parody of The North Face's brand.
- The Indian Premier League major cricket sporting event was severely criticized as Indian Puppet League, after revelations came out in 2015 regarding the match fixing and mis-governance issues associated with it. This negative portrayal of brand affected the events popularity and the credibility of associated players. The Board of Control for Cricket in India was also severely affected.
- Walmart has several anti-branding doppelganger initiatives aimed against it.
- A spoof of the Apple logo shows a worm coming out of the bitten apple and the words iWorm instead of Apple. This image was created by the hacker group Anonymous, who claimed to have infected millions of Apple devices with a malware called iWorm. The image was used to mock Apple's security and privacy policies, and to challenge its reputation as a leader in innovation and design.
- A notable example occurred in 2017 with United Airlines after a passenger was forcibly removed from a flight. The incident went viral through user-generated videos, and the brand's subsequent use of the term 're-accommodated' triggered a massive wave of doppelgänger images. These images and stories critiqued the airline's perceived lack of authenticity and served as a form of individual protest that was quickly picked up by larger media outlets.

== See also ==
- Culture jamming
- Subvertising
