= Paul Insect =

UK contemporary artist

Paul Insect is a UK contemporary artist, who is most famous for his 2007 solo show Bullion exhibition at London's Art gallery, Lazarides Gallery. Damien Hirst is reported to be a fan of Insect, having purchased the show days before it opened. Insect, who also goes by the name of PINS, worked alongside artist Banksy at the Cans Festival, the Santa's Ghetto project in Bethlehem, and on the separation wall in Palestine.

Insect is well known for his collective named 'insect' which started in 1996, and disbanded in 2005. Insect held an exhibition at a disused sex shop in London's Kings Cross area in 2008 in partnership with Lazarides Gallery. This contained 12 bronze skulls with colour enameled bunny ears.

Insect created the artwork for San Francisco-based hip hop producer DJ Shadow's 2006 The Outsider album.

== Books ==
- Bullion - Ltd Edition 500 - Published - Lazarides Inc. 2007
- Poison - Ltd Edition 500 - Published - Lazarides Inc. 2008
- The Rubbish Puppeteers Bast & Paul Insect - Limited 1000 copies
