= KAWS =

KAWS or Kaws may refer to:

- KAWS (FM), a radio station (89.1 FM) licensed to Marsing, Idaho, United States, broadcasting the Christian Satellite Network (CSN) International
- KZJB (90.3 FM), a radio station serving Pocatello, Idaho, United States, that had the call letters KAWS from 1998 to 2005
- Kaws (born 1974 as Brian Donnelly), graffiti artist, clothing and toy designer
- Topeka Kaws, an American minor league baseball team in the third iteration of the Southwestern League
- Kaw people, a federally recognized Native American tribe
