= May First/People Link =

May First Movement Technology
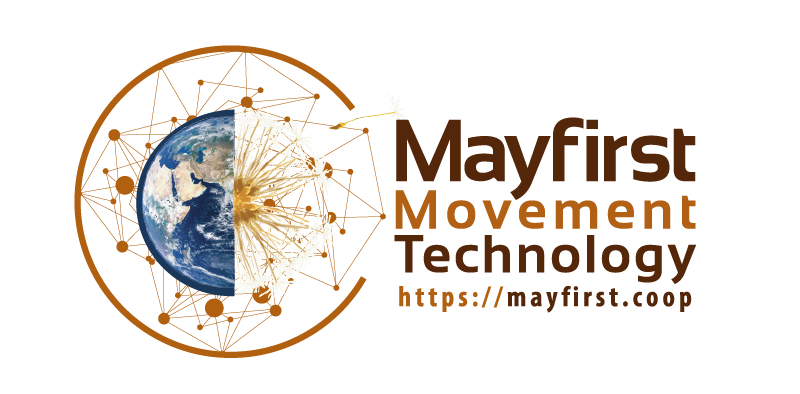
- Abbreviation: MF/PL
- Predecessor: May First / People Link
- Founders: Alfredo Lopez and Jamie McClelland
- Founded at: New York City
- Merger of: People Link
- Type: Nonprofit, membership
- Tax ID no.: 13-4062019
- Purpose: humanitarian
- Location: New York City, USA
- Region served: USA, Mexico and other
- Services: Internet services: Web hosting service, Email
- Members: 850+ membership organizations and individuals (2023)
- Official language: en, es
- Leader: Jamie McClelland
- Staff: 1 FTEs (2023)
- Volunteers: 2 (2023)
- Website: mayfirst.coop
- Remarks: motto = Growing Networks to Build a Just World.

May First Movement Technology, formerly known as May First/People Link (MF/PL), is a non-profit membership organization that uses mutual aid to provide Internet services, such as web hosting to progressive organizations and individuals. Founded in 1995 and based in New York City, MF/PL is one of the Internet's oldest progressive organizations. A member of Association for Progressive Communications, MF/PL directors, leaders, and members agree upon principles of progressive use of technology, outlined by a Statement of Unity.

From the MF/PL website:

...an organization that redefines the concept of "Internet Service Provider" in a collective, progressive and collaborative way. The members of May First/People Link are like a coop: we pay dues, buy equipment and then we all use that equipment as we need to for websites, email, email lists, and just about everything else we do on the Internet...

== History ==
May First/People Link, Local 1180 CWA AFL-CIO members, was formed from the merge between two progressive internet service providers in 2005. People Link began providing organizations with internet hosting in 1995. MF/PL supported progressive organizations' technology needs in 1999. MF/PL's history as one of the world's oldest and largest politically progressive Information and communication technologies (ICTs) began in support of alternative media during the years leading up to the anti-globalization movement.

By 2024, the organization's name had changed to May First Technology Collective.

== Leadership ==
The current co-directors of May First/People Link are Alfredo Lopez and Jamie McClelland. Founding members and other members of MF/PL leadership are represented by organizations including The Praxis Project, NACLA, Progressive Technology Project, and The Brecht Forum.

== Membership ==
Members of MF/PL include trade unions and "political pranksters who oppose globalization". Among the members are The Yes Men, Independent Media Centers, Fairness and Accuracy in Reporting, and Left Turn magazine. Other member organizations include food cooperatives, indigenous networks, grassroots organizations, and schools. In 2024, MF/PL had 850 member organisations in the US and Mexico.

== Projects ==
MF/PL organized collaborative technology for the 2009 World Social Forum in Belem, Brazil. For the United States Social Forum, MF/PL was included in the leadership of technology organizing for Atlanta, Georgia in 2007 and National Planning Committee members for the Information, Communications, and Technology working group leading up to Detroit, Michigan's event in 2010.

MF/PL takes actions to protect fair use and free speech online, such as in actions on behalf of its members against the DMCA, together with the Electronic Frontier Foundation (EFF). In 2010, the EFF supported legal action against a copyright takedown notice that caused websites hosted by MF/PL to be temporarily taken down.

Collaborative Democracy software was written for a workshop at the USSF in 2007 on the topic of Internet Bill of Rights. It has engaged many hundreds of people from all over the world to participate interactively and simultaneously on topics such as economic rights, technology principles, and participatory governance. It was performed simultaneously in Guatemala City and New York City during the Social Forum of the Americas in 2008, and in four countries, between youth, in Guatemala, Quebec, New York, and Brazil for the 2009 WSF.

MF/PL is a community member of Drupal website development and fully supports the use of free and open-source software. In 2024, Nathan Schneider described MF/PL as "rel[ying] on commons-based software exclusively".

== Publications ==
- 2007: The Organic Internet: Organizing History's Largest Social Movement

== See also ==
- Center for Media Justice
- Democratic socialism
- Global justice movement
- Highlander Research and Education Center
- Internet and media activism
- United States Social Forum
- World Social Forum
