= Joey Skaggs =

American prankster (born 1945)

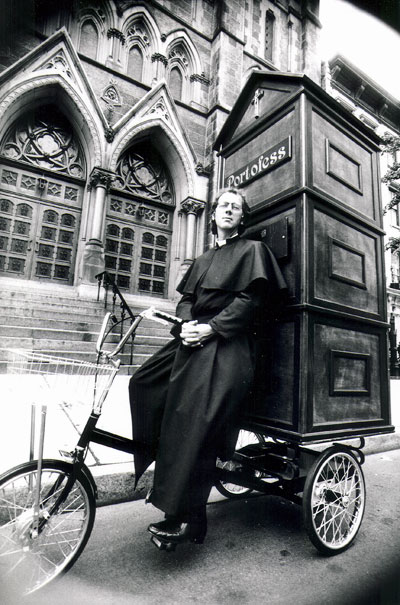
- Born: 1945 (age 80–81); United States
- Other names: Kim Yung Soo; Joe Bones; Joseph Bonuso; Giuseppe Scaggoli; Peppe Scaggolini; Dr. Josef Gregor; Joseph Virgil Skaggs; Dr. Richard J. Long; Dr. Joseph Schlafer; Dr. Joseph Chenango; Baba Wa Simba; Joseph Bucks; Jojo the Gypsy; Joseph Howard; Joseph Adore; Joseph Sullivan; The Rev. Anthony Joseph
- Education: High School of Art and Design; School of Visual Arts (BFA)
- Occupations: Artist, writer, lecturer
- Website: https://joeyskaggs.com/

Joey Skaggs (born 1945) is an American multi-media artist, activist, satirist, and educator. His work spans a range of media, including painting, sculpture, guerrilla theater, performance art, films, and media pranks, often in the form of socially revealing hoaxes. He is regarded as one of the originators of culture jamming.

== Career ==
Joey Skaggs, originally trained as a painter and sculptor, started producing performance art in the 1960s, using public spaces and mass media to present his work. His projects often include elements of guerrilla theater, satire, and hoaxes, and involve themes such as societal norms, media sensationalism, and institutional influence.

== Films ==
In 2017, the feature documentary Art of the Prank, directed by Andrea Marini, about artist Joey Skaggs, was released internationally on television and streaming platforms after screening at film festivals.

In 2020, production began on a series of short oral history films titled Joey Skaggs Satire and Art Activism, 1960s to the Present and Beyond. The films document Skaggs’ art and satirical performances.

== Partial works ==
=== 1960s and 1970s ===
==== Crucifixion ====
In the late 1960s, Skaggs created a life-size sculpture depicting a decayed Jesus Christ. The work was displayed in Tompkins Square Park and was later exhibited in 1967 at New York University and at two Central Park Be-ins. In 1969, a duplicate of the sculpture was brought to St. Patrick's Cathedral, where entry was denied by church officials and the individual was removed by police.

==== Hippie Bus Tour to Queens ====
In 1968, Skaggs organized an event in which a group of approximately 60 individuals from the East Village traveled to suburban Queens. The event involved figures including Paul Krassner and Yayoi Kusama, who painted polka dots on nude dancers during the performance. The event received media coverage, including an appearance by Skaggs on the Today, a front-page article in the New York Daily News, and reporting in The New York Times and other publications.

==== Vietnamese Christmas Nativity Burning ====
Skaggs organized a protest against the Vietnam War on Christmas Day, creating a life-size Nativity scene in Central Park. The display included a manger and papier-mâché figures, such as pigs wearing police hats, sheep holding briefcases, and a camel representing Hubert Humphrey. It also included representations of John F. Kennedy, Robert F. Kennedy, and Martin Luther King Jr. as beheaded wise men, along with a Vietnamese baby Jesus and figures representing Mary and Joseph. Skaggs and other participants, dressed as American soldiers, attempted to set fire to the display, but authorities intervened. The event was reported in The New York Times under the headline "Yippie ‘Nativity Scene’ Leads to Tickets for Littering."

==== Earlville Opera House ====
In 1971, while living on a dairy farm in central New York, Skaggs became aware of the Earlville Opera House, a building constructed in 1892 that was slated for demolition. Skaggs subsequently purchased the building and participated in efforts to preserve it. The opera house is listed on the National Register of Historic Places and operates as a performance and exhibition venue. It marked its 50th anniversary as a cultural center in 2022.

==== Cathouse for Dogs ====
The "Cathouse for Dogs" has been described as an early media hoax associated with Skaggs. In 1976, Skaggs placed an advertisement in The Village Voice promoting a service described as a "Cathouse for Dogs," stating that pet owners could pay a fee for their animals. Following media interest, an event involving volunteers and dogs was staged, and video footage was later provided to WABC-TV. The footage was incorporated into the documentary It’s A Dog’s Life, which addressed animal welfare issues and received an Emmy Award.

Skaggs was subsequently subpoenaed by the New York State Attorney General's office in connection with the incident. During the hearing, the event was described as a hoax. No correction was issued by WABC-TV.

==== Celebrity Sperm Bank ====
Later in 1976, under the alias Giuseppe Scaggoli, Skaggs announced an auction for a fictitious "Celebrity Sperm Bank," claiming to offer sperm from rock stars such as Mick Jagger, Bob Dylan, and John Lennon. On the day of the supposed event, Skaggs staged a scene outside a brownstone on Waverly Place in New York City, featuring actors posing as bidders and protesters. When the media arrived, Skaggs claimed the sperm had been stolen and read a ransom note that humorously referenced activist Abbie Hoffman. Despite the event not occurring as advertised, it attracted significant media attention in both print and broadcast news.

=== 1980s and 1990s ===
==== Metamorphosis, Cockroach Miracle Cure ====
In 1981, Skaggs orchestrated the "Metamorphosis Cockroach Miracle Cure" hoax to critique the media's susceptibility to sensational stories. Using the alias Dr. Josef Gregor—an allusion to Gregor Samsa, the protagonist in Franz Kafka’s novella The Metamorphosis—Skaggs held a press conference dressed in a white suit and Panama hat adorned with fake cockroaches. He claimed to have developed a "miracle cure" derived from hormones extracted from super-roaches immune to toxins, asserting it could treat conditions such as acne, anemia, and radiation exposure. Accompanied by friends, colleagues, and students from the School of Visual Arts, Skaggs offered the cure "freely to the world." Despite overt references to Kafka's story, the clues went unnoticed and the claim was widely reported, including by UPI.

Skaggs, in character as Dr. Gregor, appeared on WNBC-TV's Live at Five, where he was interviewed about the discovery. Media outlets, including People and The Wall Street Journal, later exposed the hoax, though WNBC-TV did not issue a retraction.

==== Fish Condos ====
In 1983, Skaggs created "Fish Condos," a series of aquatic sculptures designed to resemble domestic interior spaces, including bedrooms, bathrooms, living rooms, and kitchens. The works functioned as aquariums.

The sculptures have been described as addressing themes such as gentrification in New York City and environmental issues. "Fish Condos" received media coverage in publications including New York Magazine and Life, as well as in the Neiman Marcus Christmas catalog. They were also featured on television and exhibited in museums and galleries worldwide.

==== Bad Guys Talent Management Agency ====
In 1984, Skaggs created a project referred to as the "Bad Guys Talent Management Agency." The agency was presented as representing "bad guys, bad girls, bad kids, and bad dogs" and was associated with an effort to promote actor Verne Williams. As part of the project, a mock Federal Bureau of Investigation wanted poster was used as a headshot and distributed to casting agents in New York City.

Williams subsequently obtained a role in the film The Last Dragon, produced by Berry Gordy. The project received media coverage, including in People, and generated responses from individuals seeking representation.

==== The Fat Squad ====
In 1986, Skaggs, using the alias Joe Bones, created a project referred to as the "Fat Squad," presented as an organization offering to enforce clients’ diets for a daily fee with a minimum service period. The group was described as monitoring clients and preventing them from deviating from prescribed diets, and was associated with the motto, "You can hire us, but you cannot fire us. Our commandos take no bribes."

The project received media coverage, including a segment on Good Morning America, which featured a staged scenario involving a client and individuals identified as "commandos" guarding a refrigerator.

==== April Fool’s Day Parade ====
In 1986, Skaggs announced the creation of the "Annual New York City April Fools’ Day Parade," a satirical event publicized through recurring press releases. The parade has been described as featuring floats and performers depicting political figures and social issues. According to the press materials, the route begins at Fifth Avenue and 59th Street and ends at Washington Square Park, where a "King of Fools" is crowned.

==== Comacocoon and Hair Today, Ltd. ====
In 1990, Skaggs orchestrated two simultaneous hoaxes, "Comacocoon" and "Hair Today, Ltd." "Comacocoon" was presented as a company offering a vacation alternative involving anesthesiology and subliminal programming, claiming to provide benefits such as relaxation, weight loss, and elective surgery. "Hair Today, Ltd." purported to offer total scalp transplants using donor cadavers. Promotional materials for both fictitious companies were designed to resemble genuine advertisements and were sent exclusively to journalists. The exaggerated claims were intended to attract media attention. After both campaigns generated coverage and Comacocoon received a subpoena from the Department of Consumer Affairs with 17 charges related to the company's claims, Skaggs revealed them as hoaxes.

==== Portofess ====
In July 1992, Skaggs, using the alias Father Anthony Joseph, an Anglican priest from California, pedaled "Portofess," a portable confessional booth mounted on a tricycle to the Democratic National Convention at Madison Square Garden in New York City. The manifesto he handed out declared "Religion on the move for people on the go" and said, "The church must go where the sinners are."

==== SEXONIX ====
In the fall of 1993, Skaggs, using the alias Dr. Joseph Skaggs, announced the launch of "SEXONIX," a purported virtual reality company claiming to turn sexual fantasies into immersive virtual experiences. Skaggs announced the company would debut at the Metro Toronto Christmas Gift and Invention Show but, just before it did, he alleged that Canadian customs had seized the equipment at the border, labeling it morally offensive. Taking the hoax into cyberspace, Skaggs posted messages on electronic bulletin boards in New York and San Francisco (early precursors to social media platforms), asking for public assistance in retrieving the equipment. The hoax attracted media attention in both Canada and the U.S. and has been described as one of the earliest documented internet hoaxes, illustrating the potential for disinformation in the emerging digital age.

==== Maqdananda Psychic Attorney ====
Skaggs created a 30-second television commercial featuring Maqdananda, a new-age psychic attorney who claimed he could predict outcomes for his clients. Offering services like psychic surgery malpractice and renegotiating past-life contracts, the ad aired on CNN Headline News across the Hawaiian Islands. Callers to 1-808-UCA-DADA were met with the message, "I knew you’d call."

==== Dog Meat Soup ====
In 1994, Skaggs, posing as Kim Yung Soo, the head of a fictional Korean company called Kea So Joo, Inc. (purportedly translating to "dog meat soup with alcohol" in Korean), launched a hoax titled "Dog Meat Soup." Skaggs claimed the company was offering to buy unwanted dogs from shelters for $0.10 per pound for human consumption. Despite never directly responding to any inquiries, reports emerged alleging conversations with company representatives, along with unverified claims that large dogs were disappearing from the streets and that legal charges were being pursued against the company. Skaggs later revealed the hoax, which he orchestrated with assistance from Korean collaborators. The performance aimed to critique the media's willingness to report on news without verification and highlighted widespread cultural bias.

==== The Solomon Project ====
In 1995, Skaggs, under the alias Dr. Joseph Bonuso, Ph.D., announced the creation of the "Solomon Project," a fictitious artificial intelligence program he claimed could deliver swift, unbiased legal verdicts and revolutionize the American judicial system. Following O.J. Simpson’s acquittal in the trial for Nicole Simpson’s murder, Skaggs, as Dr. Bonuso, declared that the Solomon Project had found Simpson guilty. CNN contacted the Solomon Project and aired a segment examining the implications of using AI in legal decision-making. After discovering the project was a hoax, CNN issued a follow-up report acknowledging they had been misled.

==== STOP BioPEEP ====
Between 1996 and 1998, Skaggs, using the alias Dr. Joseph Howard, created a media hoax titled "Stop BioPEEP." In this performance, Skaggs portrayed a whistleblower alleging that a fictional multinational corporation was developing a virus capable of genetically addicting consumers to specific products, transforming them into "consumer junkies." He further claimed this virus could be used for targeted genetic manipulation, which he termed "gene-ocide," suggesting it could eliminate specific groups. The hoax incorporated an international group of collaborators, a fake website, and staged protests in the U.S. and Australia, including one at the United Nations. The hoax attracted media attention and, at times, was conflated with reports of an emerging bird flu outbreak in China. Skaggs later explained that the performance was designed to provoke discussion about the ethical and societal implications of genetic engineering.

==== Doody Rudy ====
In 1999, Skaggs organized the "Doody Rudy" protest in New York's Washington Square Park in response to then Mayor Rudy Giuliani’s policies, which included efforts to limit creative expression and the "quality of life" campaign targeting homelessness. Skaggs collaborated with artist Steve Powers (ESPO) to create a 10’ x 14’ painting depicting Giuliani as the Madonna. Protesters, wearing "Doody Rudy" hats, wheeled a trashcan filled with faux elephant dung and held signs such as "Doody Rudy with Dumbo’s Dung" and "Help Support the Homeless—$1.00 Contribution Per Throw Will be Donated to Housing Works, Inc." Participants threw the faux dung at the portrait, referencing Giuliani's criticism of Chris Ofili’s Holy Virgin Mary painting, which incorporated elephant dung and had been displayed at the Brooklyn Museum. Giuliani had publicly opposed the exhibition and threatened to withdraw city funding from the museum. The funds raised during the protest were donated to Housing Works, a non-profit organization supporting homeless individuals living with AIDS.

=== 2000 to present ===
==== Final Curtain ====
In 2000, Skaggs launched "Final Curtain," a performance art hoax critiquing the commercialization of the death-care industry. Advertisements in alternative newspapers with the tagline "Death got you down? At last an alternative" directed readers to a website for the fictitious "Final Curtain" memorial theme park and mall. The site featured detailed architectural drawings, a business plan, artist-designed memorials, and descriptions of attractions such as "Dante’s Grill," themed gift shops and restrooms each equipped with a perpetually flowing drinking fountain of nondenominational holy water. The website also listed fictional company executives, with Skaggs personally assuming all roles in media responses.

==== Bush ====
On July 4, 2004, Skaggs staged a satirical performance in New York City's Washington Square Park, critiquing President George W. Bush’s leadership. Skaggs, dressed as Uncle Sam, pedaled a tricycle carrying a large replica of the White House and led a parade of approximately 75 participants, including singers, cheerleaders, and actors portraying government officials. At the park’s center, Skaggs delivered a speech and opened the replica White House to reveal an effigy of President Bush seated on an upside-down bucket of fertilizer. The effigy was surrounded by symbolic props, including toilet paper designed to resemble hundred-dollar bills, toy weapons, and a pen attached to a replica of the Constitution, for its potential rewriting. Actors portraying members of the President’s Cabinet and Saudi Royals distributed mock $20 bills, representing the purchase of votes, as part of the performance. The event continued Skaggs’ tradition of using public art and mobile sculptures to address political and social issues through satire and humor.

==== Mobile Homeless Homes ====
In 2012, Skaggs staged a protest at the Goldman Sachs headquarters in New York City, critiquing the role of major financial institutions in the 2008 economic and housing crisis. As part of the protest, Skaggs, portraying "Recycle Man," towed a sculpture titled Mobile Homeless Homes with a tricycle. The sculpture, resembling three connected garbage receptacles, was designed to appear like overflowing trash cans but was hollow and habitable. The performance was accompanied by participants dressed as homeless Muppet-inspired characters and a band playing a satirical song titled Mobile Homeless Blues. The protest referenced reports of Goldman Sachs employees allegedly using "Muppets" as a derogatory term for clients affected during the financial downturn.

==== Santa's Missile Tow ====
In 2012, Skaggs staged another performance art piece titled Santa’s Missile Tow outside the United Nations headquarters in New York City. Dressed as Santa Claus, Skaggs pedaled a mobile rocket launcher featuring a 10-foot mock nuclear missile mounted on a slingshot. Accompanied by six performers dressed as elves, he delivered a message to world leaders with the slogan, "Peace on Earth—Or Else." The performance included a parody of "Jingle Bells," with revised lyrics critiquing nuclear proliferation and advocating for peace.

==== Bigfoot and The Tiny Top Circus ====
In 2014, Skaggs, under the alias Peppe Scaggolini, staged a performance art piece titled The Tiny Top Circus in Washington Square Park, New York City. Promoted as "the world’s only pataphysical circus," the event featured a purported Bigfoot, displayed in a cage draped with a circus tent and mounted on the back of a tricycle. The tricycle was pedaled into the park by a performer billed as "the world’s strongest man." The event included theatrical elements such as armed guards, a carnival barker, sword swallowers, jugglers, and live music by the Coney Island Sideshow Band. Audience members were escorted to view Bigfoot, which was ultimately revealed to be Skaggs dressed as a large, hairy foot.

==== Political protests ====
Following the election of Donald Trump as president in 2016, Skaggs incorporated a series of performances titled "Trumpathons" into his Annual New York City April Fools' Day Parade. The 32nd Annual Parade in 2017 featured a sculpture called "Trump’s Golden Throne," depicting a life-sized effigy of Trump tweeting while seated in a golden outhouse. Parade participants, many wearing Trump masks, attempted to set a Guinness World Record for the largest gathering of Trump look-alikes.

In 2018, for the 33rd Annual Parade, Skaggs staged "Trump's Military Parade," inspired by Trump's expressed interest in a military display. The performance featured an effigy of Trump riding a tricycle-mounted rocket launcher, accompanied by look-alikes of world leaders, including Kim Jong Un and Vladimir Putin, alongside participants in Trump masks portraying soldiers.

The 34th Annual Parade in 2019 included an oversized effigy of Trump with a Pinocchio-like nose, wearing a witch's hat and cape, and accompanied by a mobile Kool-Aid stand. Participants held signs and wore Trump masks, critiquing the volume of false statements attributed to the President during his administration.

Since 2021, Skaggs’ website has offered satirical materials, including a customizable Trump Presidential Pardon and, since 2022, a downloadable Top Secret Cover Sheet for Classified Information. During the 37th Annual Parade in 2022, Skaggs distributed Putin Protest Masks as a statement against Russia’s invasion of Ukraine. In 2024, for the 39th Annual Parade, a billboard truck displayed images of Skaggs as the Grim Reaper alongside his sculpture "Democracy at the Guillotine," encouraging voter participation. As of December 2024, the website also offered a customizable Biden Presidential Pardon.

In 2025, Skaggs announced the 40th edition of his annual April Fools' Day Parade, using the occasion to satirize current events and public figures through a parade lineup. The theme included commentary on artificial intelligence, celebrity scandals, and political corruption. As part of the celebration, Skaggs provided downloadable cut-out masks of notable political figures, encouraging participants to "march in place" in the spirit of parody. In an interview with Time Out New York, he described the parade as "a satire on parades, the news, and reality itself."

== See also ==
- Alfred Jarry
- Jonathan Swift, or A Modest Proposal
- Mark Twain
- H. L. Mencken
- P. T. Barnum
- Poor Richard's Almanack
- Marcel Duchamp
- Improvisation
- Pataphysics
