= Billboard Utilising Graffitists Against Unhealthy Promotions =

Australian artistic movement practicing defacement of billboards

BUGA UP
- Billboard Utilising Graffitists Against Unhealthy Promotions

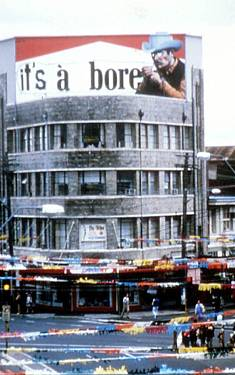
- A Marlboro billboard that has been altered to read “it’s a bore”, North Sydney
- Abbreviation: BUGA UP
- Predecessor: Non-Smokers Rights Movement; MOP UP (Movement Opposed to the Promotion of Unhealthy Products)
- Formation: October 1979; 47 years ago
- Founders: Bill Snow; Ric Bolzan; Geoff Coleman
- Founded at: Sydney
- Purpose: Anti-smoking
- Location: Australia
- Methods: Billboard hijacking using graffiti
- Field: Subvertising
- Key people: Arthur Chesterfield-Evans; Danielle Kluth; Fred Cole; Lord Bloody Wog Rolo; Peter Vogel
- Publication: B.U.G.A.U.P.
- Website: bugaup.org

Billboard Utilising Graffitists Against Unhealthy Promotions, or B.U.G.A.U.P. (alternatively, BUGA-UP or BUGA UP) is an Australian subvertising artistic movement that plays on the phrase "bugger up". It practices billboard hijacking using détournement or modification with graffiti of billboard advertising that promote things that are deemed unhealthy. At the time of its formation, smoking in Australia was common and increasing in popularity, since cigarette advertising was largely unregulated, leading to popular campaigns such as Paul Hogan's Winfield ad series.

== History ==
The movement started in inner-city Sydney in October 1979, later spreading to Melbourne, Hobart, Adelaide and Perth. It has been active ever since, although its peak activity was in the late 1970s and early-mid 1980s. It was aimed mainly at cigarette and alcohol advertising, often blanking out letters and adding others to promote their view that the product is unhealthy. Cola and soft drink ads were also targeted.

The movement did not formalize itself as a group with memberships or meetings. Graffitists "joined" by signing the BUGA-UP name to their work. Their graffiti spread rapidly across Australia and then overseas.

Many of the members came from professional and university-educated backgrounds. A founding member was Bill Snow, who first started to alter tobacco billboards with graffiti, and continued to be active in anti-smoking and littering campaigns. Together, Snow, Ric Bolzan and Geoff Coleman coined the acronym BUGA-UP; they began adding it to the altered billboards to link the graffiti to a movement rather than the random activity of individuals.

Former New South Wales politician Arthur Chesterfield-Evans was a member of BUGA-UP before entering politics. Other well-known BUGA-UP members were the late Lord Bloody Wog Rolo, Peter Vogel, and Fred Cole.

== Impact ==
The Cancer Council of Western Australia states that the BUGA-UP campaign of the mid-1980s "radicalised the advertising debate and made it suddenly more respectable for previously conservative medical associations and colleges to rattle the legislative cage".

Former Daily News reporter Joanne Fowler states that prior to the BUGA-UP campaigns of the 1980s, journalists were unwilling to publish articles critical of the tobacco industry because they were seen as mundane. Almost all forms of tobacco advertising were made illegal in Australia in 1992.

== See also ==
- Billboard Liberation Front (aka Billboard Improvement)
