= Transpromotional =

Transpromotional ("transpromo") is a compound term from "transaction" and "promotional". By adding relevant messages, companies can piggyback promotion or advertising onto existing transaction-related documents, such as statements, invoices, or bills. These documents combine CRM (customer relationship management) and data mining with variable data printing and location intelligence.

Using the space on electronic documents and bills for marketing and promotional offers often results in higher click rates and ROI than traditional email marketing. Email content can be customized to include relevant, targeted, and personalized marketing offers.

== Overview ==
Adding promotion onto existing transaction-related documents has a number of advantages over promotion by other means.

1. Openability. Statements and invoices are expected and usually require action, containing important financial information. Over 95% of transaction documents are opened and read each month, far more than other direct response efforts.
2. Engagement. Bills and statements get more attention than other communication forms, including television advertisements, resulting in higher conversion and click rates. Customers typically spend one to three minutes reviewing statements.
3. Cost efficiency. Transactional email messaging eliminates the need for costly traditional paper inserts.
4. Reporting. Billers can track detailed promotion activity. This type of detailed tracking and reporting facilitates intelligent, revenue-based marketing decisions, derived from measurable customer behavior.
5. Returns. Statement-based marketing is effective because it targets current customers. A five percent increase in current customer business can translate into as much as a 50 percent increase in bottom-line profits.
6. Customized offers. Statement-based marketing is effective because it enables customized offers to be automatically generated by the transactional data within the document itself. It can be personalized according to customer demographics, business drivers and marketing criteria.

== See also ==
- Ad creep
- Document automation
- Customer experience
- Document composition
- Enterprise output management
