= Epoq Group =

- Company type: Private
- Genre: Document Automation Technology
- Founded: 1994
- Founder: Grahame Cohen
- Number of locations: London, U.K. Boxborough, MA U.S.A. Cape Town, S.A.
- Key people: Richard Cohen; Grahame Cohen; Richard Granat; Hillel Horwitz; Michael Symons
- Products: RapidocsWeb; Rapidocs Authoring

Epoq Group is an insurtech service provider that provides document automation systems. The company supplies document assembly technologies in the U.K and U.S.A which were developed to enable corporates and law firms to provide documents & contracts to customers online

== History ==
The company has been involved in activities surrounding the Legal Services Act 2007 and the opening up of the UK legal services market to competition from non-lawyer organisations. In 2002 Epoq provided the technology platform for a legal service delivered to MORE TH>N's policyholders; this marked the first entry of a large consumer facing insurance brand into the UK legal services market. In 2006 Epoq's technology was used by the Halifax to provide a subscription based web service for consumers thereby becoming the first major bank to enter the legal services market. Other services have been developed for RBS Group, Saga and the AA.

Epoq has also supplied document automation systems to the U.K legal profession. In 2008 Epoq launched the UK's largest "virtual" law firm, MyLawyer.co.uk in partnership with firms from the UK's legal 500. This was followed in 2009 with the launch of two SaaS services for law firms; DirectLaw providing a client-facing portal for self-serve document drafting and Rapidocs LawDraft providing firms with in-house document automation.

In 2011, Epoq was shortlisted for the Financial Times Innovative Lawyers award and in February 2015 it joined forces with Tikit, part of BT Group, to bring TIkit LawDraft to legal firms in the UK.

Epoq entered the US market in July 2016 with the launch of LawAssure, a legal services benefit. Since then the company has launched services for Mutual of Omaha and Foresters Financial.

In the UK, Epoq developed and launched a new online legal service, Legal for Life in 2016. Aimed at helping individuals deal easily with everyday legal matters, Legal for Life was designed to be distributed to consumers via life and protection insurers, as well as employee benefit providers.

2017 saw Epoq enter the ASEAN region through a legal tech venture with ZICO Holdings, which offered SMEs in the area access to online legal documents. Then in early 2018, Epoq expanded its international presence further with the opening of an office in South Africa

== Rapidocs ==
Rapidocs produces documents by presenting users with an interactive question and answer session which aims to mimic a face to face interview between a lawyer and a client. This data capture system is linked to an automated document that determines the right language and clauses to make up a final draft through the use of pre-programmed logic. The content for the system is developed through a legal team and maintained to track developments in the law.

== See also ==
- Document automation
- Legal Services Act 2007
- Richard Susskind
