= Predatory business =

Predatory business may refer to:

- Predatory pricing
- Predatory lending
- Predatory advertising
