= Ad creep =

Process of increasing advertising over time

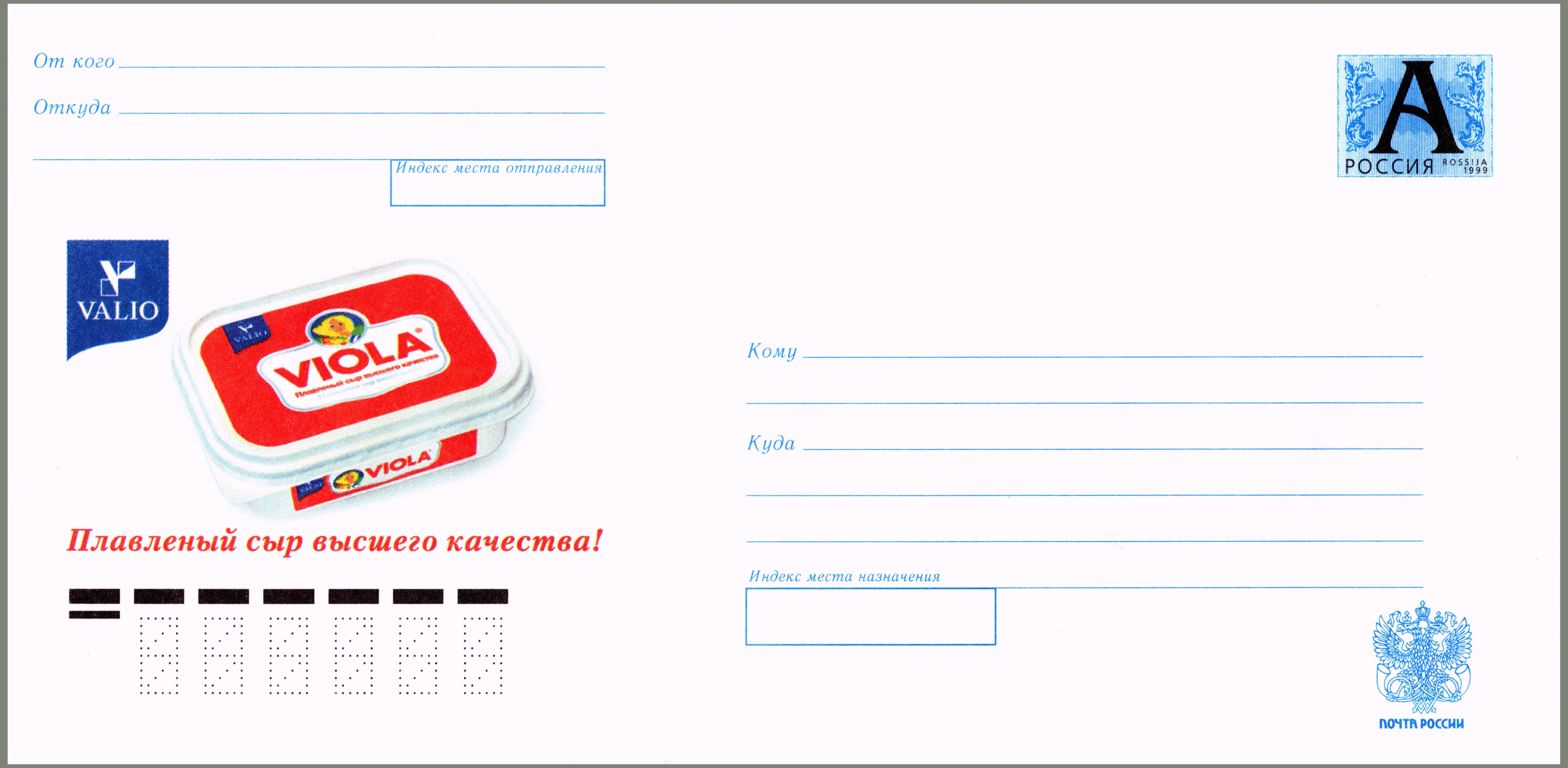
A Valio advertisement on an envelope

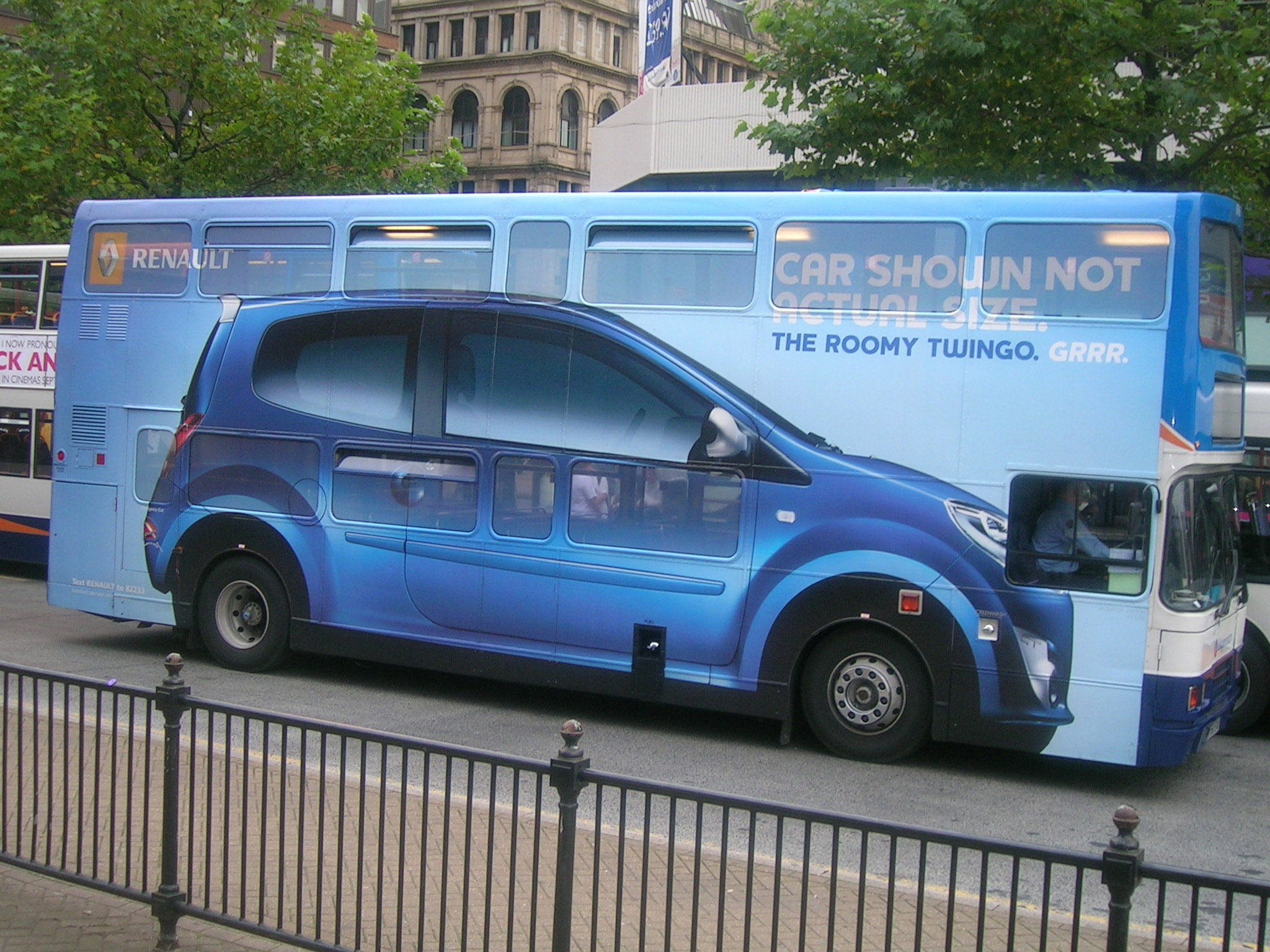
A Renault advertisement covers an entire Stagecoach Manchester bus

Ad creep is the "creep" of advertising into previously ad-free spaces.

The earliest verified appearance of the term "ad creep" is in a 1996 article "Creeping Commercials: Ads Worming Way Into TV Scripts" by Steve Johnson for the Chicago Tribune, however it may have been coined by a subscriber to Stay Free! magazine, according to another source.

While the virtues of advertising can be debated, ad-creep often especially refers to advertising which is invasive and coercive, such as ads in schools, doctor's offices and hospitals, restrooms, elevators, on ATMs, on garbage cans, on vehicles, on restaurant menus, and countless other items. In Steve Johnson's piece referenced above, he criticizes product placement and "creative advertising enhancements" as "one more manifestation of an environment in which the commercial assault is almost nonstop". Commercial Alert, a nonprofit organization founded by Public Citizen "to keep the commercial culture within its proper sphere, and to prevent it from exploiting children and subverting the higher values of family, community, environmental integrity and democracy" also characterizes "ad creep" as an assault, with ad companies fighting a "relentless battle to claim every waking moment, and what one executive called, with chilling candor, mind share". A 2017 Daily Express story in the UK suggests "the creeping incursion of adverts in Windows 10" has been an issue.

On the other hand, modern advertisers are compelled to react to changes in consumer habits. An article in The New York Times notes that "consumers’ viewing and reading habits are so scattershot now that many advertisers say the best way to reach time-pressed consumers is to try to catch their eye at literally every turn." And, the article suggests that ad agencies believe that as long as ads are entertaining, people may not mind the saturation. As people have turned from traditional media, advertisers have not only struggled to create brand awareness, but there is also a move to "microtarget people at precisely timed moments" as well, according to an article in Stay Free!.

Occasionally, the term "ad creep" has been used to describe a process of slowly infusing more ads into places where ads have been expected (television shows, for example) such as in a 2011 Advertising Age article describing the increase in both the time devoted to ads and the number of ad messages in the Super Bowl. This is not a standard use of the term, but it is related. A 2017 blog post by the chief global analyst of Kantar Millward Brown, a marketing firm, notes "that average ad loads on national television in the U.S. continued to creep upwards from 10.4 minutes per hour in December 2014, to 10.9 minutes in December 2016". Although the increase is less than 5%, he suggests "marketers should be concerned because the evidence suggests that more clutter is a bad thing for brands."

== Examples ==
- Most sports venues, amateur and professional, have especially experienced a noticeable increase of advertising since the 1980s. In ice hockey, most rinks added advertisements to the side of the rinks during the late 1980s, and in 2010, advertisements have been placed on the Plexiglass in NHL arenas. Also, the introduction of digital scoreboards has allowed more easily accessible advertisements to be used.
- Since the 1990s advertising during television programs outside of commercial breaks/intros/outros has also been noticeably more present. More recently, small animated ads have been placed as banners near the bottom of the viewing area.
- After deregulation of cable television in the United States in 1971, the service was sold as an ad-free alternative to over-the-air broadcasting. As it grew more popular, however, ads were gradually introduced.
- Earthstamp, founded in 2009, creates forms that can be used to imprint ads on the sand at beaches, but these could be a nuisance or even illegal on public land.
- In 2011, a clothing company in New Zealand promoted its short-shorts by installing indented plates on bus stop benches, imprinting its advertising on women's thighs and a Japanese firm registered "1300 young women" willing to rent their thighs for ad space in 2012.
- Once the last major US league to hold out, the NBA implemented a jersey advertisement program for the 2017–18 season, which continues as of November 2022.
- In 2025, Kong Junyou, a student at Shanghai University, protested the spread of loud digital advertising in residential elevators by shutting down more than 100 advertising screens without damaging them. The action prompted discussion of the increasingly unavoidable commercial use of everyday residential spaces.

== Organisations fighting ad-creep ==
- Adbusters
- Commercial Alert

== See also ==
- Criticism of advertising
- Transpromotional
