= Media fatigue =

Psychological exhaustion from media consumption

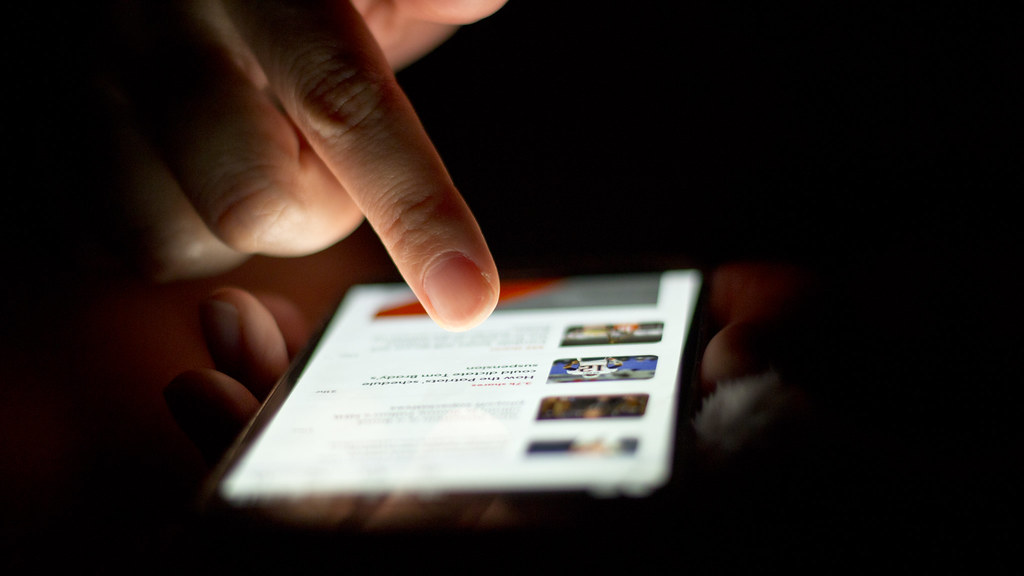
Scrolling through the news on a smartphone

Media fatigue is psychological exhaustion due to information overload from any form of information media, usually news and social media. The advent of the Internet has contributed widely to media fatigue with vast amounts of information easily accessible and easily disseminated. Psychological exhaustion caused by media fatigue can lead to several harms, including emotional instability, increased stress, feeling overwhelmed, or experiencing sensory overload. Media fatigue can then lead to media avoidance, or intentional selectivity in the type and amount of media used.

== Political and news media ==
Repeated exposure to the same topic in the media over a long period of time has shown to cause psychological fatigue. While psychological fatigue has no singular definition, it can be characterized by negative emotions such as stress, overwhelm, strain, and sensory overload. Gurr and Metag suggest some examples of this phenomenon have occurred in response to COVID-19, Brexit, and climate change coverage. Extensive coverage on the same topic for extended periods of time can be draining, both mentally and physically. In response to perceived fatigue, those consuming media will engage in avoidance strategies so as not to view that particular topic. Specifically with morally weighty topics, the more a person sees media about this topic, the more apathetic they become (see compassion fatigue). This can come from broadcast news, political or humanitarian advertising, radio, newspapers, social media, etc.

The concept of news avoidance entails taking efforts to avoid associating with a topic that makes the viewer anxious. Themes that are repeatedly shown in the news can produce overwhelming feelings of concern, such as coverage of a crisis.

== Social media ==
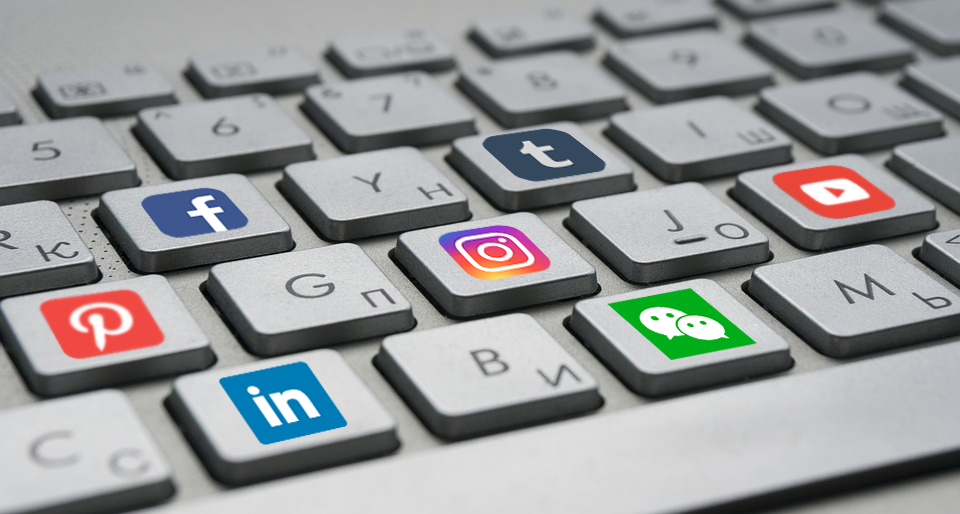
Media icons on a keyboard

Social media has become a significant part of our lives today, with around 3 billion people being on some sort of social media platform. Social media can have similar impacts on media fatigue and avoidance. Several studies have demonstrated the effects that social media has had on our attention spans, showing how our fast-paced society affects our ability to focus on one thing at a time. In fact, it has been reported that our attention spans have come to a low amount of 8 seconds. Research has found that overconsumption of social media leads to information overload and cognitive fatigue. Because many social media users get their news on social networking sites, in addition to other updates and information, this can cause higher strain and greater psychological stress and fatigue than other, more traditional forms of media. Social media has also shown to have greater strain on the individual because of privacy concerns and self-disclosure. These two aspects are unique to social media sites and require more monitoring of how a person interacts and engages on social media if they are not anonymous, potentially causing greater fatigue than traditional media.

An online study in Lithuania found that during the COVID-19 pandemic, there was a rise in social media fatigue. Due to social media being the primary way of connecting with others during quarantine, its presence in people's lives has grown prior to the pandemic. These circumstances have led to an overconsumption of social media.

== Avoidance ==
Avoidance can occur during media selection, for example, actively choosing one source of information over another. Avoidance can also occur during media consumption, for example, by changing the channel or tuning out the message. Tilo Hartmann suggests humans engage in avoidance behaviors to avoid cognitive dissonance, because the current messages they are receiving are challenging their current belief systems. "For example, dissonances can result from cognitive overtaxing, leading to an end to TV exposure." Another theoretical underpinning is a cost-benefit analysis the media consumer performs, whether intentional or subconscious. There are perceived benefits and costs to consuming media, and one reason a person might choose to avoid media from this perspective would be to avoid costs such as "money, time, physical and mental effort, and possible feelings of guilt, fear, irritation and dissonance."

Social media habits can also include selective avoidance, meaning the user chooses to expose themselves to specific topics and news online. Filtering technologies on social media allow users to be presented with content that supports their opinions. Because of these technologies, users can spend more time on social media. In short, selective avoidance is a result of media fatigue, in which a user takes steps to prevent feeling overwhelmed when a specific subject is brought up.

== Zoom fatigue ==
René Riedl defines Zoom fatigue as the tendency to feel inclined to avoid video conferencing software due to extensive overuse. In relation to the COVID-19 pandemic, there is a dependence on video conference software to keep in contact with those not living in the same household. While the term Zoom fatigue is referring directly to the online video conferencing software, it can also be applied to all other types of online video conferencing software that we have had to use throughout the pandemic. Zoom has become a significant part of our everyday lives in the past 2 years with the rise of the pandemic. All types of people are using Zoom, including students, teachers, employees, managers, etc. The shift from in person to online has not been an easy one for many people, and having to learn and converse through a screen has affected many, leading to things such as Zoom fatigue.

Liz Fosslien and Millie West Duffy state that Zoom calls have been draining and have led to Zoom fatigue because "they force us to focus more intently on conversations in order to absorb information". Since stay at home and quarantine orders had made it impossible for us to meet in person, Zoom was the solution that most people had to resort to. Therefore, we had to come up with solutions and ways to help with our Zoom fatigue since we couldn't just go back to in person. Some fixes and solutions to Zoom fatigue have been listed as not multitasking to not divert your attention too much while on Zoom calls, scheduling breaks between Zoom calls to have off-screen time to not exhaust your media fatigue, shortening meetings if you are able to and are in control of it, etc.

== See also ==
- Ad fatigue
