= Bears and Man =

1978 film

- Title frame from film, with helicopter slinging a tranquilized bear
- Directed by: Bill Schmalz
- Written by: Bill Schmalz; Kalle Lasn
- Narrated by: Chief Dan George; Patricia Best
- Cinematography: Bill Schmalz
- Edited by: Kalle Lasn
- Music by: Craig Tomlinson
- Production company: Wilderness Cinegraphic
- Distributed by: National Film Board of Canada
- Release date: 1978
- Running time: 25 mins
- Country: Canada
- Language: French

Bears and Man (French title: L'Ours Mon Frère) is a 1978 Canadian educational film by Bill Schmalz. It was produced by the National Film Board of Canada (NFB) and Parks Canada. The film documents human-bear interactions in Canada's National Parks. It was narrated by Chief Dan George and Patricia Best, and was co-written and edited by Adbusters founder Kalle Lasn.

== Background ==
Canada's mountain national parks, particularly Banff and Jasper, had become popular international destinations by the 1930s. Parks Canada allowed the development of new paved roads, resulting in an influx of automobile tourism. Interacting with the many black and grizzly bears in the parks became a popular activity, with many tourists feeding the animals and posing for pictures. By the 1960s, Parks Canada noted the existence of "problem" or "bum" bears; these were animals who had become dependent on human food and habituated to human contact, making them a threat to both visitors and themselves. Tourists were mauled and killed, and hundreds of bears were destroyed. By the late 1960s, the agency decided that it needed more educational materials to help inform tourists of good practices regarding bears. It had published pamphlets since the 1940s, but saw the need for a film exploring the troubled relationship between bears and humans.

== Production ==
Schmalz, who had recently finished a film on Dall sheep, contacted the NFB about making an educational film about bears in the Parks. The filmmaker had become interested in the topic after learning of the shooting of two grizzly cubs in Banff by park wardens. Parks Canada agreed to help produce the film, and Schmalz began work in 1974. He consulted with park wardens in Kootenay, Waterton, Banff, and Jasper national parks. Storyboards were developed with the consultation of the Parks agency.

Schmalz attended bear conferences and worked with biologists, including Stephen Herrero from the University of Calgary. The film was shot in 16 mm over three years and adhered to a strict script. He witnessed some horrific events during the filming; a wildlife biologist technician was mauled to death when a drugged grizzly woke up during transport. Wardens also enticed bears into good filming locations with elk carcasses. Scenes of wardens shooting bears were cut from the final film by Parks Canada.

After filming was completed, the NFB brought in Kalle Lasn, an Estonian-Canadian editor. Lasn had just returned from Japan, and brought "avant-garde" editing styles. They worked together on writing the narration, which would be spoken by Chief Dan George and Patricia Best. The musical score was written by Craig Tomlinson who also had suggested the use of Chief Dan George for narration and singers Anne Mortifee and Jane Mortifee to be used in the film's score. Tomlinson had worked during production on second camera and sound recording as well as in post production with Lasn, as an assistant editor. The film was released in 1978.

== Synopsis ==
The film is roughly separated into five sequences. The first sequence features George's narration, where the relationship between the two species is introduced. As Best's narration takes over, the film relates the problem of the "bum" bear and how bears become habituated to human contact and food. A third sequence uses actors to portray a couple camping in Banff. They notice grizzly tracks and subsequently use the Parks' suggested practices when setting up their camp.

The film documents tourists interacting with bears, often feeding them from cars. It captures dramatic scenes of "bear traffic jams", where dozens of vehicles stop to feed and cajole groups of bears. Parks officials relate bear problems within the parks; Schmalz filmed one official describing a tourist attempting to push a black bear into the driver's seat of his car for a photo opportunity. Through the Park wardens, the film illustrates the measures humans should take to keep bears wild and unspoiled.

== Awards ==
The film won the 1980 Wildlife Society Conservation Education Award, as well as an award at the International Wildlife Film Festival. Schmalz's camerawork was recognized by the Alberta Cinematographers Association. It also received the Certificate of Excellence from the 1981 Audubon International Environmental Film Festival.

== See also ==
- Bear 71, a 2012 National Film Board of Canada web documentary about human-bear interactions in Banff National Park.
