= Ernst Bettler =

Fictional graphic designer, subject of a hoax

Ernst Bettler is a fictional Swiss graphic designer. He was invented by Christopher Wilson in a 2000 hoax article published in the second issue of Dot Dot Dot, a magazine of visual culture.

According to the article, Bettler was asked in the 1950s to design advertisement posters for Pfäfferli+Huber (P+H), a Swiss pharmaceutical manufacturer. The article states that Bettler knew of the company's involvement in Nazi concentration camp experiments and decided to accept the commission with the intention of damaging P+H. The four posters he created, Wilson's article recounts, were exemplary works of International Typographic Style design, advertising P+H drugs such as "Contrazipan". However, according to the article, the posters featured abstract compositions that could be read as capital letters – spelling out "N - A - Z - I" when displayed in sequence. Wilson's article states that the public outcry that followed the public display of the posters ruined P+H in a matter of weeks.

Even though it was highly detailed and featured many photographs and illustrations, the article was a complete fabrication. Ernst Bettler, Pfäfferli+Huber and its drugs do not exist, and neither do the Swiss towns "Sumisdorf" and "Burgwald" that feature in the article – their names are presumably based on the real Swiss towns of Sumiswald and Burgdorf. Nonetheless, the story was well received in graphic design circles. Among others, the September/October 2001 "Graphic Anarchy" issue of Adbusters magazine hailed Bettler's work as "one of the greatest design interventions on record", and the 2002 graphic design textbook Problem Solved by Michael Johnson covers Bettler as one of the "founding fathers of the 'culture-jamming' form of protest".

Wilson's article was first revealed to be false in a 2002 entry in the blog Lines and Splines by Andy Crewdson. The Bettler hoax and its reception was subsequently covered by Rick Poynor in an article in the February 2003 issue of Eye magazine, as well as by other blogs.
