= Kalle Lasn =

Estonian-Canadian film maker, author, and activist (b. 1942)

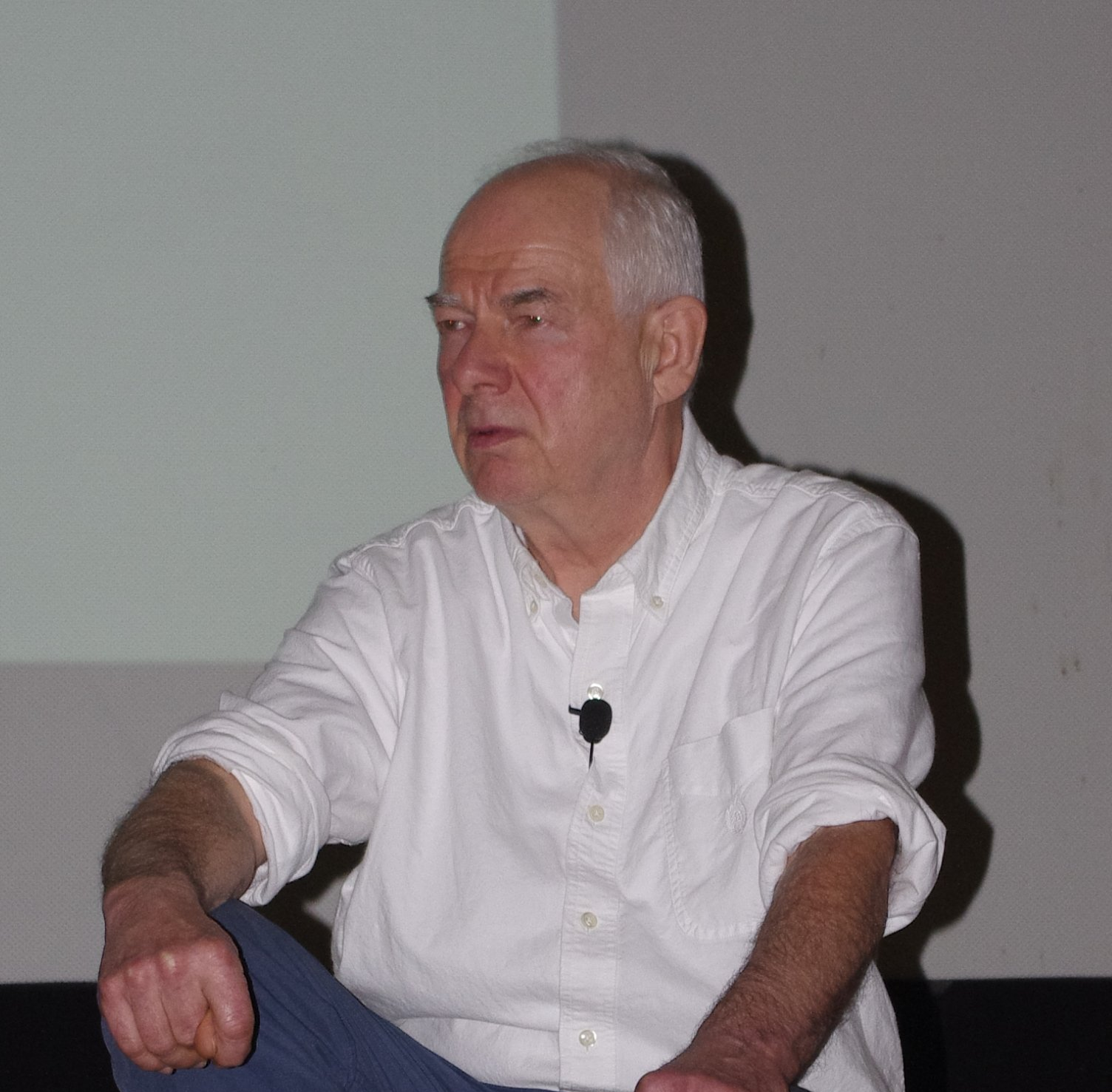
- Lasn in 2013
- Born: March 24, 1942 (age 84); Tallinn, Estonia
- Occupation: co-founder of Adbusters Media Foundation
- Known for: Adbusters, culture jamming
- Spouse: Masako Tominaga

Kalle Lasn (Estonian pronunciation: [ˈkɑlˑɛ ˈlɑsn̥]) (born March 24, 1942) is an Estonian-Canadian film maker, author, magazine editor, and activist. Near the end of World War II, his family fled Estonia and spent some time in a German refugee camp. When he was seven he and his family were resettled in Australia, where he grew up and remained until the late 1960s, attending school in Canberra. In the late 1960s, he founded a market research company in Tokyo, and in 1970, moved to Vancouver, British Columbia, Canada. Over the course of twenty years, he produced documentaries for PBS and Canada’s National Film Board. He currently resides in Vancouver, British Columbia.

He is the co-founder of Adbusters magazine and author of the books Culture Jam and Design Anarchy and is the co-founder of the Adbusters Media Foundation, which owns the magazine. He reportedly started Adbusters after an epiphany that there was something profoundly wrong with consumerism. It happened in a supermarket parking lot. Frustrated that he had to insert a quarter to use a shopping cart, he jammed a bent coin in so that the machine became inoperable. This act of vandalism was his first (quite literal) "culture jam"—defined as an act designed to subvert mainstream society.

== Life and work ==
Born in Tallinn, Estonia, during World War II, Lasn's family fled to Germany and he spent several years after the war in a displaced-persons camp before his family were offered resettlement in Australia. In Australia he earned a degree in applied mathematics and then relocated to Tokyo, where he spent five years running his own market-research firm before eventually immigrating to Canada in 1970. Lasn’s life works are applied within the philosophical lens of the French Situationists theory and the philosophy of detournement. His concept pertained to the "rerouting [of] spectacular images, environments, ambiences and events to reverse or subvert their meaning." Lasn has also contemporized the concept of the Spectacle, in which he applies to explain the thousands of images encountered by consumers on a daily basis.

In an interview with PRWeek magazine, Lasn recalls the moment in 1989, as an environmental campaigner, when he realized that all brands carry a "political message". In response to a multimillion-dollar marketing campaign launched by the forest industry, which sought to reassure the Pacific Northwest that they had nothing to worry about, Lasn and his team developed a 30-second advertisement of their own which would challenge the initial campaign. However, Lasn’s attempt at airing the spot on television ultimately failed, as the TV station refused to sell him any time. Lasn referred to this move as "absurd and unfair" because "even the most innocuous product ad is laden with unspoken and unquestioned political assumptions", adding that no line exists between product and advocacy ads, and that all ads are political.

=== Adbusters ===
Inspired by what he saw as the lack of democracy in access to all-power media, Lasn founded Adbusters, a bi-monthly radicalizing magazine which lends itself the title of one of the leading voices in global environmentalism, anti-capitalist and anti-consumerist movements. Having worked in market research in Japan in the 1960s, Lasn drew from his personal experience and knowledge to produce publications and campaigns that would employ the necessary tools and techniques to create powerful imagery, stunts, slick graphics and vibrant language to promote his cause.

By taking conventional marketing communication techniques and applying them to anti-consumerism messages, Adbusters has created a powerful, global social movement, which takes aim at large-scale industries. Although the company’s headquarters in Vancouver only has ten employees, it has a large global following, with 40,000 paper subscribers and 30,000 online subscribers. Lasn claims that ‘’Adbusters" is the "hub of global activism – it’s the (communication) model of the future".

== Books and films ==
In his first book, Culture Jam, Lasn portrays consumerism as the fundamental evil of the modern era. He calls for a "meme war": a battle of ideas to shift Western society away from consumer capitalism. Lasn, in his book, calls on the values of authenticity, individuality and freedom of expression. He promotes the rebelling of the notion that hierarchies can dictate people’s identities. Essentially, Lasn’s concept of culture jamming calls upon consumers to value experiences over possessions, while accusing marketing experts of co-opting these values and "slapping a brand name on them".

His second book, Design Anarchy, calls on graphic designers and consumers to turn from serving corporate interests towards redemption of the "mental environment", by embracing an aesthetic devoted to social and environmental responsibility. The book, which in an introduction to Lasn’s notion of culture jamming, includes a compilation of some of Adbuster’s greatest moments, but with the addition of what Lasn calls a "technical event", which forces the mind to take notice of something and search for meaning, even if there is no meaning. This "technical event" invites readers to become mindful of their patterns of consumption. Similar to Lasn’s prior book, Design Anarchy is a "personal statement, manifesto and textbook", which takes many of the prominent advertising campaigns found in the Adbusters magazine, and reconfigures them to stop "the flow of bits of information long enough to interrupt the spectacle, to promote the jolt, to allow the process of awareness". In the book, Lasn claims that if members of a society can begin by "demarketing" themselves, then they are able to demarket certain rituals imposed by commercial forces, consequently shifting the ways in which the customer interacts with mass media, the way information flows, and the ways in which meaning is produced, ultimately leading to a break in commercial meaning and a shift to a post-consumerist society.

In his third book, Meme Wars: The Creative Destruction of Neoclassic Economics, Lasn prefaces the book by calling on University students to realize that they are being "fooled by the façade" of the capitalist educational system, adding that the lack of incorporation of externalities such as species extinction, resource depletion, climate change, and financial meltdowns has turned the profession into a "target for derision and ridicule". Lasn challenges students to look beneath the surface of the façade to realize that economics is a "highly contested" and "questionable" field. To do so, Lasn offers two distinct ways for students to approach their academic endeavours: to either "accept the status quo" of the system, or become "an agitator, a provocateur, a meme warrior, and occupier", calling on students to engage in a paradigm shift within educational institutions. The book includes a series of essays, photographs and advertisements, which support Lasn’s approach to culture jamming.

Lasn made documentary films for 20 years beginning in 1970 - many of them to do with Japan, the homeland of his wife, Masako Tominaga. His award-winning films include:

- Bears and Man (Co-writer, editor)
- Japan Inc: Lessons for North America?
- Japanese Woman
- Satori in the Right Cortex
- The Rise and Fall of American Business Culture
- The Autumn Rain: Crime in Japan

== Activism and views ==
Lasn, in collaboration with others of Adbusters, came up with the original idea for an Occupy Wall Street (OWS) demonstration, but has been careful not to claim ownership of it. In a CBC TV interview, Lasn described OWS as an example of radical democracy and suggested a local movement might emerge, perhaps Occupy Main Street.

=== On Jews and Israel ===
In March 2004, Lasn published an article in Adbusters entitled "Why Won't Anyone Say They Are Jewish?", establishing a link between Jewish groups who do not explicitly announce their religion and ultimate control of United States foreign policy. In the article, he listed George W. Bush-era neoconservatives who he believed were Jews. According to Lasn, less than two percent of Americans are Jewish, while 26 of the top 50 Bush-era neoconservatives who advocated war in Iraq were Jewish (52 percent). In 2010, Lasn's magazine published a photo montage comparing the WWII Warsaw Ghetto to the Gaza Strip.

== Bibliography ==
- Lasn, Kalle (2000) Culture Jam, New York: Quill
- Lasn, K. (2005) Design Anarchy, Vancouver: Adbusters Media Foundation
- Lasn, Kalle (2012) Meme Wars: The Creative Destruction of Neoclassical Economics, New York: Seven Stories Press, ISBN 978-1609804732.
- Lasn, Kalle (2025)[2023] Manifesto for World Revolution. Sheffield: Unbreaking. ISBN 9781917159104.
