= Document composition =

Process of creating documents

Document composition is the process of creating documents which meet the needs of a business, to help them fulfill their business requirements. Document composition is primarily used by organizations to communicate with their customers, and plays a vital role in customer relationship management. It is often a subdivision of a company's customer communications management department. Document composition software permits the creation, printing, and distribution of documents in a way that gives consistency and aesthetics which enhance the corporation's image.

== See also ==
- Document automation
