= Commercial Alert =

Commercial Alert is a project of Public Citizen, a consumer advocacy non-profit organization. Commercial Alert opposes advertising to children and the commercialization of culture, education, and government. It works on issues such as commercialism, consumerism, product placement, native advertising, advertising in schools, ad-creep, and privacy. It works to reduce the negative impacts of advertising on public health, such as obesity. It was co-founded in 1999 by prominent consumer advocate Ralph Nader.

The mission of Commercial Alert is "to keep the commercial culture within its proper sphere, and to prevent it from exploiting children and subverting the higher values of family, community, environmental integrity and democracy".

In 2001, it complained to the Federal Trade Commission that Internet search engines were failing to unambiguously label paid results as advertising.

In 2005, the Federal Trade Commission rejected a request by Commercial Alert to identify product placement in television programs as advertising.

In 2007, Commercial Alert criticized Jack Daniel's' sponsorship of the television series Mad Men.
