= Stay Free! =

American non-profit magazine

- Categories: Zines Online magazine
- Founder: Carrie McLaren
- Founded: 1993; 33 years ago
- Final issue: 2008; 18 years ago
- Country: United States
- Based in: Chapel Hill, North Carolina Brooklyn, New York
- Language: English
- Website: stayfreemagazine.org

Stay Free! was a non-profit magazine about the politics of culture based in Chapel Hill, North Carolina and then Brooklyn, New York.

== History ==
Stay Free! was founded by Carrie McLaren in 1993 while living in Chapel Hill as a companion zine to her issuance of Archers of Loaf's first single. After a hiatus, and following a move to New York, Ms. McLaren resumed issuing the zine in a "tabloid format" while working at Matador Records. The zine described itself as focused on "the perversions of media and consumer culture." Each issue had a theme, such as pranks, copyright, or marketing and issues included interviews with, among others, Lawrence Lessig, Negativland, Stuart Ewen, and Public Enemy.

In March 2007, Carrie McLaren announced Stay Free! would no longer be published in print, though they would continue online. The last print issue appeared in 2008. The website is no longer online. In 2009, the editors of Stay Free! released the book Ad Nauseam: A Survivor's Guide to American Consumer Culture.

The name was intended as an ironic homage to Stayfree maxipads, though it is also the title of a song by The Clash.

== Other projects ==
To protest the expansion of copyright law, the magazine sponsored the Illegal Art exhibition, website and compact disc, all featuring artists challenging copyright or art works which were the subject of copyright suits. Stay Free! also published a free media literacy curriculum.

== Distribution ==
Stay Free! was distributed in the coffee shops, book shops, and other commercial venues of Brooklyn. One magazine cost $2.95.

== See also ==
- Adbusters
- The Baffler
