= Adbusters =

Canadian nonprofit organization

Adbusters Media Foundation
- Founded: 1989
- Founder: Kalle Lasn and Bill Schmalz
- Location: Vancouver, British Columbia, Canada
- Key people: Kalle Lasn, co-founder and editor-in-chief; Bill Schmalz, co-Founder and co-publisher; Darren Fleet, senior editor; Stefanie Krasnow, senior editor; Douglas Haddow, senior editor
- Website: Adbusters.org

Adbusters (the foundation's magazine)
- Cover of Issue # 98 (Nov/Dec 2011) of Adbusters
- Founder: Kalle Lasn and Bill Schmalz
- Frequency: Bi-monthly
- First issue: 1989
- Country: Canada
- Language: English
- Website: Adbusters.org
- ISSN: 0847-9097

The Adbusters Media Foundation is a Canadian-based not-for-profit, pro-environment organization founded in 1989 by Kalle Lasn and Bill Schmalz in Vancouver, British Columbia. Adbusters describes itself as "a global network of artists, activists, writers, pranksters, students, educators and entrepreneurs who want to advance the new social activist movement of the information age."

As anti-capitalist or opposed to capitalism, it publishes the reader-supported, advertising-free Adbusters, an activist magazine devoted to challenging consumerism. The magazine has an international circulation peaking at 120,000 in the late 2000s with circulation of 60,000 in 2022. Past and present contributors to the magazine include Jonathan Barnbrook, Morris Berman, Brendan Connell, Simon Critchley, David Graeber, Michael Hardt, Chris Hedges, Bill McKibben, Jim Munroe, David Orrell, Douglas Rushkoff, Matt Taibbi, Slavoj Žižek, and others.

Adbusters has launched numerous international campaigns, including Buy Nothing Day, TV Turnoff Week and Occupy Wall Street, and is known for their "subvertisements" that spoof popular advertisements. In English, Adbusters has bi-monthly American, Canadian, Australian, UK and International editions of each issue. Adbusters's sister organizations include Résistance à l'Aggression Publicitaire and Casseurs de Pub in France, Adbusters Norge in Norway, Adbusters Sverige in Sweden and Culture Jammers in Japan.

== History ==
Adbusters' first uncommercial

Adbusters was founded in 1989 by Kalle Lasn and Bill Schmalz, a duo of award-winning documentary filmmakers living in Vancouver. Since the early 1980s, Lasn had been making films that explored the spiritual and cultural lessons the West could learn from the Japanese experience with capitalism.

In 1988, the British Columbia Council of Forest Industries, the "voice" of the logging industry, was facing tremendous public pressure from a growing environmentalist movement. The logging industry fought back with a television ad campaign called "Forests Forever." It was an early example of greenwashing: shots of happy children, workers and animals with a kindly, trustworthy sounding narrator who assured the public that the logging industry was protecting the forest.

Lasn and Shmalz, outraged by the use of the public airwaves to deliver what they felt was deceptive anti-environmentalist propaganda, responded by producing the "Talking Rainforest" anti-ad in which an old-growth tree explains to a sapling that "a tree farm is not a forest." But the duo proved to be unable to buy airtime on the same stations that had aired the forest-industry ad. According to a former Adbusters employee, "The CBC's reaction to the proposed television commercial created the real flash point for the Media Foundation. It seemed that Lasn and Schmaltz's commercial was too controversial to air on the CBC. An environmental message that challenged the large forestry companies was considered 'advocacy advertising' and was disallowed, even though the 'informational' messages that glorified clearcutting were OK."

The foundation was born out of their belief that citizens do not have the same access to the information flows as corporations. One of the foundation's key campaigns continues to be the Media Carta, a "movement to enshrine The Right to Communicate in the constitutions of all free nations, and in the Universal Declaration of Human Rights."

The foundation notes that concern over the flow of information goes beyond the desire to protect democratic transparency, freedom of speech or the public's access to the airwaves. Although it supports these causes, the foundation instead situates the battle of the mind at the center of its political agenda. Fighting to counter pro-consumerist advertising is done not as a means to an end, but as the end in itself. This shift in emphasis is a crucial element of mental environmentalism.

== Mental environmentalism ==
The subtitle of Adbusters magazine is "The Journal of the Mental Environment."

In a 1996 interview, Kalle Lasn explained the foundation's goal:

What we're trying to do is pioneer a new form of social activism using all the power of the mass media to sell ideas, rather than products. We're motivated by a kind of 'greenthink' that comes from the environmental movement and isn't mired in the old ideology of the left and right. Instead, we take the environmental ethic into the mental ethic, trying to clean up the toxic areas of our minds. You can't recycle and be a good environmental citizen, then watch four hours of television and get consumption messages pumped at you.

== Issues ==
=== Anti-advertising ===
Adbusters describes itself as anti-advertising: it blames advertising for playing a central role in creating and maintaining consumer culture. This argument is based on the premise that the advertising industry goes to great effort and expense to associate desire and identity with commodities. Adbusters believes that advertising has unjustly "colonized" public, discursive and psychic spaces, by appearing in movies, sports and even schools, so as to permeate modern culture. Adbusters's stated goals include combating the negative effects of advertising and empowering its readers to regain control of culture, encouraging them to ask "Are we consumers and citizens?"

Since Adbusters concludes that advertising conditions people to look to external sources, to define their own personal identities, the magazine advocates a "natural and authentic self apart from the consumer society". The magazine aims to provoke anti-consumerist feelings. By juxtaposing text and images, the magazine attempts to create a means of raising awareness and getting its message out to people that is both aesthetically pleasing and entertaining.

Activism also takes many other forms such as corporate boycotts and 'art as protest', often incorporating humor. This includes billboard modifications, google bombing, flash mobs and fake parking tickets for SUVs. A popular example of cultural jamming is the distortion of Tiger Woods' smile into the form of the Nike swoosh, calling viewers to question how they view Woods' persona as a product. Adbusters calls it "trickle up" activism, and encourages its readers to do these activities by honoring culture jamming work in the magazine. In the September/October 2001 "Graphic Anarchy" issue, Adbusters were culture jammed themselves in a manner of speaking: they hailed the work of Swiss graphic designer Ernst Bettler as "one of the greatest design interventions on record", unaware that Bettler's story was an elaborate hoax.

=== Media Carta ===
"Media Carta" is a charter challenging the corporate control of the public airwaves and means of communication. The goal is to "make the public airwaves truly public, and not just a corporate domain." Over 30,000 people have signed the document voicing their desire to reclaim the public space. On 13 September 2004, Adbusters filed a lawsuit against six major Canadian television broadcasters (including CanWest Global, Bell Globemedia, CHUM Ltd., and the CBC) for refusing to air Adbusters videos in the television commercial spots that Adbusters attempted to purchase. Most broadcasters refused the commercials, fearing the ads would upset other advertisers as well as violate business principles by "contaminating the purity of media environments designed exclusively for communicating commercial messages". The lawsuit claims that Adbusters' freedom of expression was unjustly limited by the refusals. Adbusters believes the public deserves a right to be presented with viewpoints that differ from the standard. Under Section 3 of the Broadcasting Act, television is a public space allowing ordinary citizens to possess the same rights as advertising agencies and corporations to purchase 30 seconds of airtime from major broadcasters. There has been talk that if Adbusters wins in Canadian court, they will file similar lawsuits against major U.S. broadcasters that also refused the advertisements. CNN is the only network that has allowed several of the foundation's commercials to run.

=== Legal action ===
On 3 April 2009, the British Columbia Court of Appeal unanimously overturned a BC Supreme Court ruling that had dismissed the case in February 2008. The court granted Adbusters the ability to sue the Canadian Broadcasting Company and CanWest Global, the corporations that originally refused to air the anti-car ad "Autosaurus". The ruling represents a victory for Adbusters, but it is the first step of their intended goal, essentially opening the door for future legal action against the media conglomerates. Kalle Lasn declared the ruling a success and said, "After twenty years of legal struggle, the courts have finally given us permission to take on the media corporations and hold them up to public scrutiny."

== Campaigns ==
=== Culture jamming ===
Corporate American flag

Culture jamming is the primary means through which Adbusters challenges consumerism. The magazine was described by Joseph Heath and Andrew Potter in their book The Rebel Sell as "the flagship publication of the culture jamming movement." Culture jamming is heavily influenced by the Situationist International and the tactic of détournement. The goal is to interrupt the normal consumerist experience in order to reveal the underlying ideology of an advertisement, media message, or consumer artifact. Adbusters believe large corporations control mainstream media and the flow of information, and culture jamming aims to challenge this as a form of protest. The term "jam" contains more than one meaning, including improvising, by re-situating an image or idea already in existence, and interrupting, by attempting to stop the workings of a machine.

As already noted, the foundation's approach to culture jamming has its roots in the activities of the situationists and in particular their concept of détournement. This involves the "turning around" of received messages so that they communicate meanings at variance with their original intention. Situationists argue that consumerism creates "a limitless artificiality", blurring the lines of reality and detracting from the essence of human experience. In the "culture jamming" context, détournement means taking symbols, logos and slogans that are considered to be the vehicles upon which the "dominant discourse" of "late capitalism" is communicated and changing them – frequently in significant but minor ways – to subvert the "monologue of the ruling order" [Debord].

The foundation's activism links grassroots efforts with environmental and social concerns, hoping followers will "reconstruct [their] self through nonconsumption strategies." The foundation is particularly well known for its culture jamming campaigns, and the magazine often features photographs of politically motivated billboard or advertisement vandalism sent in by readers. The campaigns attempt to remove people from the "isolated reality of consumer comforts".

=== Blackspot Shoes campaign ===
In 2004, the foundation began selling vegan, indie shoes. The name and logo are "open-source"; in other words, unencumbered by private trademarks. Attached to each pair was a "Rethink the Cool" leaflet, inviting wearers to join a movement, and two spots – one for drawing their own logos and another on the toe for "kicking corporate ass."

There are three versions of the Blackspot Sneaker. The V1 is designed to resemble the Nike-owned Converse Chuck Taylor All-Stars (Nike bought Converse in 2003). There is also a V1 in "fiery red."

The V2 is designed by Canadian shoe designer John Fluevog. It is made from organic hemp and recycled car tires.

After an extensive search for anti-sweatshop manufacturers around the world, Adbusters found a small union shop in Portugal. The sale of more than twenty-five thousand pairs through an alternative distribution network is an example of Western consumer activism marketing.

Adbusters describes its goals vis-à-vis Blackspot as follows:

Blackspot shoes is our experiment with grassroots capitalism. After spending many years railing against the practices of megacorporations like McDonalds, Starbucks and Nike, we wanted to prove that running an ethical, environmentally responsible business is possible ... and that taking market share away from megacorporations is better than whining about them.

==== Reception ====
Heath and Potter's The Rebel Sell, which is critical of Adbusters, claimed that the blackspot shoe's existence proves that "no rational person could possibly believe that there is any tension between 'mainstream' and 'alternative' culture."

In the June 2008 cover story of BusinessWeek Small Business Magazine, the Blackspot campaign was among three profiled in a piece focusing on "antipreneurs." Two advertising executives were asked to review the campaign for the article's "Ask the Experts" sidebar. Brian Martin of Brand Connections and Dave Weaver of TM Advertising both gave the campaign favorable reviews.

Martin noted that Blackspot was effectively telling consumers, "We know we are marketing to you, and you are as good as we are at this, and your opinion matters," while Weaver stated that "This is not a call to sales of the shoe so much as it is a call to participate in the community of Adbusters by buying the shoe."

=== Occupy Wall Street ===
In mid-2011, Adbusters Foundation proposed a peaceful occupation of Wall Street to protest corporate influence on democracy, a growing disparity in wealth, and the absence of legal repercussions in the 2008 financial crisis. They sought to combine the symbolic location of the 2011 protests in Tahrir Square with the consensus decision making of the 2011 Spanish protests. Adbusters' senior editor Micah White said they had suggested the protest via their email list and it "was spontaneously taken up by all the people of the world." Adbusters' website said that from their "one simple demand—a presidential commission to separate money from politics" they would "start setting the agenda for a new America." They promoted the protest with a poster featuring a dancer atop Wall Street's iconic Charging Bull. On 13 July 2011 it was the staff at the magazine that created the #OCCUPYWALLSTREET hashtag on Twitter.

While the movement was started by Adbusters, the group does not control the movement, and it has since grown worldwide.

== Criticisms ==
=== Criminal Mischief ===
The foundation has been criticized for solicitating dangerous criminal mischief by escalating their methods to deflate "SUV tires in an effort to fight climate change."

=== Commercial style ===
The foundation has been criticized for having a style and form that are too similar to the media and commercial product that Adbusters attack, that its high gloss design makes the magazine too expensive, and that a style over substance approach is used to mask sub-par content.

Heath and Potter posit that the more alternative or subversive the foundation feels, the more appealing the Blackspot sneaker will become to the mainstream market. They believe consumers seek exclusivity and social distinction and have argued that the mainstream market seeks the very same brand of individuality that the foundation promotes; thus they see the foundation as promoting capitalist values.

The Blackspot Shoes campaign has stirred heated debate, as Adbusters admits to using the same marketing technique which it denounces other companies for using by originally purchasing much advertising space for the shoe.

=== Legal issues ===
Adbusters launched a legal challenge in 1995. A second in 2004 was against CBC, CTV, CanWest and CHUM, for refusing to air anti-consumerism commercials, therefore infringing on the staff's freedom of speech. In one case, a CHUM representative is quoted as saying the ads "were so blatantly against television and that is our entire core business. You know we can't be selling our airtime and then telling people to turn their TVs off."

=== Alleged antisemitism ===
In March 2004, Adbusters was accused of antisemitism after running an article titled "Why won't anyone say they are Jewish?" The article compiled a list of neoconservative supporters within the Bush administration and marked the names of those it believed to be Jewish with a black dot. It questioned why, given Israel's role, the political implications of this supposed Jewish neoconservative influence on U.S. foreign policy in the Middle East were not a subject of debate.

In October 2010, Shopper's Drug Mart pulled Adbusters off of its shelves after a photo montage comparing the Gaza Strip to the Warsaw Ghetto was featured in an article criticizing Israel's embargo of Gaza. The Canadian Jewish Congress campaigned to have the magazine blacklisted from bookstores, accusing Adbusters of trivializing the Holocaust and of antisemitism. In response, Adbusters argued that the charge of antisemitism was being used to silence what it considered legitimate criticism of Israeli policies.

=== Ineffective activism ===
Some critics claim that culture jamming does little to incite real difference. Others declare the movement an easy way for upper- and middle-class citizens to feel empowered by engaging in activism that bears no personal cost, such as the campaign "Buy Nothing Day". These critics express a need for "resistance against the causes of capitalist exploitation, not its symptoms".

== Awards ==
In 1999, Adbusters won the award for National Magazine of the Year in Canada.

== See also ==
- Ad creep
- The Chaser
- Culture jamming
- Downhill Battle
- Engaged Buddhism
- Free-culture movement
- Geez magazine
- Indymedia
- Led By Donkeys
- No Logo
- Situationist International
- StayFree! magazine
- The Yes Men
- Timeline of Occupy Wall Street
