= Document automation =

Design of systems for electronic documents

Document automation (also known as document assembly) is the design of systems and workflows that assist in the creation of electronic documents. These include logic-based systems that use segments of pre-existing text and/or data to assemble a new document. This process is increasingly used within certain industries to assemble legal documents, contracts and letters. Document automation systems can also be used to automate all conditional text, variable text, and data contained within a set of documents.

Automation systems allow companies to minimize data entry, reduce the time spent proofreading and reduce the risks associated with human error. Additional benefits include: time and financial savings due to decreased paper handling, document loading, storage, distribution, postage/shipping, faxes, telephone, labor and waste.

== Document assembly ==
The basic functions are to replace the manual filling in of repetitive documents with template-based systems where the user answers software-driven interview questions or data entry screen. The information collected then populates the document to form a first draft'. Today's more advanced document automation systems allow users to create their own data and rules (logic) without the need for programming.

While document automation software is used primarily in the legal, financial services, and risk management industries, it can be used in any industry that creates transaction-based documents. A good example of how document automation software can be used is with commercial mortgage documents. A typical commercial mortgage transaction can include several documents, including:

- promissory note
- environmental indemnity
- trust deed
- mortgage
- guaranty

Some of these documents can contain as many as 80 to 100 pages, with hundreds of optional paragraphs and data elements. Document automation software has the ability to automatically fill in the correct document variables based on the transaction data. In addition, some document automation software has the ability to create a document suite where all related documents are encapsulated into one file, making updates and collaboration easy and fast.

Simpler software applications that are easier to learn can also be used to automate the preparation of documents, without undue complexity. For example, Pathagoras holds itself out as a 'plain text, no fields allowed' document assembly system. Clipboard managers allow the user to save frequently-used text fragments, organize them into logical groups, and then quickly access them to paste into final documents.

== In supply chain management ==
There are many documents used in logistics. They are called: invoices, packing lists/slips/sheets (manifests), content lists, pick tickets, arrival acknowledgment forms/reports of many types (e.g. MSDS, damaged goods, returned goods, detailed/summary, etc.), import/export, delivery, bill of lading (BOL), etc. These documents are usually the contracts between the consignee and the consignor, so they are very important for both parties and any intermediary, like a third party logistics company (3PL) and governments. Document handling within logistics, supply chain management and distribution centers is typically performed in manual labor or semi-automatically using bar code scanners, software and tabletop laser printers. There are some manufacturers of high speed document automation systems that will automatically compare the laser printed document to the order and either insert or automatically apply an enclosed wallet/pouch to the shipping container (frequently a flexible polybag or corrugated fiberboard/rigid container). See below for external website video links showing these document automation systems. Protection of Privacy and Identity Theft are major concerns, especially with the increase of e-Commerce, Internet/Online shopping and Shopping channel (other, past references are catalog and mail order shopping) making it more important than ever to guarantee the correct document is married or associated to the correct order or shipment every time. Software that produces documents are: ERP, WMS, TMS, legacy middleware and most accounting packages.

A number of research projects have looked into wider standardization and automation of documents in the freight industry.

== In legal services ==
Automation technology may be used in the production of legal documents, such as employment contracts and estate planning documents, potentially with the use of an online interface or decision tree. In large law firms document assembly systems are often used to systemize work, such as through the creation of complex term sheets and the first drafts of credit agreements.

With the liberalisation of the UK legal services market spearheaded by the Legal Services Act 2007 large institutions have broadened their services to include legal assistance for their customers. Most of these companies use some element of document automation technology to provide legal document services over the Web. This has been seen as heralding a trend towards commoditization whereby technologies like document automation result in high volume, low margin legal services being ‘packaged’ and provided to a mass-market audience.

Early technical approaches to legal document assembly involved marrying artificial intelligence logic with standard user interfaces. For high-volume regulatory filings, the 1999 Intelligent Filing Manager (INTELLIFM) utilized a distributed architecture where early AI systems (via Prolog rules) served as the logic engine to automate the publishing and population of legal forms.

== Challenges and Limitations ==
Document automation, in some cases, uses artificial intelligence or large language models (LLM) software, templates, and rules to create, compose and handle documents with minimal human interference.

This eliminates repetitive tasks in contract drafting or other functions like report composition or invoice creation, freeing up valuable time and administrative resources, and also facilitating scalability in large-scale operations thereby ensuring consistency and accuracy across works. This also applies to a uniform or consistent language, approved clauses and formatting to a document, reducing human error and facilitating compliance to established regulatory frameworks.

Although the advantages of using document automation is enormous, it still comes with significant implementation obstacles. For instance, remote workers and their respective clients need initial investment to create templates, operational rules, data integration and also be sufficiently trained to ensure machine-human worker compatibility.

Also, overreliance on generative models raises the risk of content inaccuracies across multiple outputs, particularly in complex legal matters or contexts, and leaves business leaders needing to spend a significant amount of time confirming a document's reliability and accuracy. Furthermore, when AI or LLM is used to create a document, there is the potential for hallucinations, generating inconsistent content, and providing inaccurate information in more nuanced or legal-technical contexts, requiring significant human review time. In some industries, concerns extend to the accuracy and potential bias of science and data security of the document generated.

== In insurance ==
Insurance policies and certificates, depending on the type, policy documents can also be hundreds of pages long and include specific information on the insured. Typically, in the past, these insurance document packets were created by a) typing out free-form letters, b) adding pre-printed brochures c) editing templates and d) customizing graphics with the required information, then manually sorting and inserting all the documents into one packet and mailing them to the insured. The various documents included in one packet could include the following kinds of documents:

- Welcome letter
- Contract
- Certificate
- State-specific policy documents
- Listing of items insured and insurance amounts
- Amendments
- Riders
- ID card
- Company information
- Marketing material (other products)
- Data

A lot of work can go into putting one packet together. In most policy admin systems, the system will generate some kind of policy statement as a starting point, but might need to be customized and enhanced with other required materials.

== See also ==
- Document composition
- Document modelling
- Document processor
- Template processor
- Turnaround document
