= Predatory advertising =

Marketing that manipulates vulnerable groups

Predatory advertising, or predatory marketing, can be largely understood as the practice of manipulating vulnerable persons such as children, or adults with cognitive issues into unfavorable market transactions through the undisclosed exploitation of these vulnerabilities. The vulnerabilities of persons/populations can be hard to determine, especially as they are contextually dependent and may not exist across all circumstances. Commonly exploited vulnerabilities include physical, emotional, social, cognitive, age, and financial characteristics.

Predatory marketing campaigns may also rely on false or misleading messaging to coerce individuals into asymmetrical transactions. The history of the practice has existed as long as general advertising, but particularly egregious forms have accompanied the explosive rise of information technology. Massive data analytics industries have allowed marketers to access previously sparse and inaccessible personal information, leveraging and optimizing it through the use of savvy algorithms.

Some common examples include for-profit college industries, "fringe" financial institutions, political micro-targeting, and elder/child exploitation. Many legal actions have been taken at different levels of government to mitigate the practice, with various levels of success.

== Vulnerable populations ==
Predatory advertising depends, in large part, on the deliberate exploitation of individuals based on specific traits, life circumstances, or membership within certain groups. The "vulnerabilities" created by these characteristics are context-dependent, meaning they vary between markets and transactions. In other words, an individual with some or any of these traits is not rendered universally vulnerable within the marketplace. Furthermore, not all marketing or advertisements targeting these traits are necessarily "predatory," as the condition for the practice relies primarily on the intent of the advertiser. This distinction can be especially opaque given marketing's natural tendency—even within ethical bounds—to identify the "pain points" of potential consumers. Nonetheless, it can be helpful to delineate the most common forms of vulnerability. Some of the most common avenues of exploitation are:

1. Physical vulnerability, wherein certain biological or physiological traits render an individual less likely to engage in market transactions from a fair position. Examples of this may include the targeting of overweight individuals with ineffective weight loss supplements, or the advertisement of unregulated "medical" devices to those suffering from degenerative or other painful diseases.
2. Cognitive vulnerability, wherein cognitive deficiencies render an individual unable to fully comprehend and process advertising information that may be deceptive or manipulative. Examples of this are not limited to the cognitively disabled, and may include advertising that targets minors or the elderly.
3. Motivational vulnerability, wherein certain individual traits or extraordinary personal circumstances may inhibit a person's ability to resist or properly negotiate certain market advances. Examples of this may include the advertisement of price-inflated funeral services to freshly grieving individuals (a practice which has been addressed by the FTC's "Funeral Rule")
4. Social vulnerability, wherein the social circumstances of an individual greatly increases their propensity to engage in unfavorable transaction. Examples of this include the marketing of for-profit colleges to combat veterans struggling to find gainful employment.
5. Emotional vulnerability, wherein the emotional states of individuals—temporary or persisting—are leveraged by advertisers to sell products that purportedly address these emotional ills. This avenue of exploitation has become especially pertinent as marketer access to data on individual users has become increasingly comprehensive, and algorithms have been able to return relevant advertisements in almost real-time.
6. Economic vulnerability, wherein an individual's economic circumstances either limits their ability to engage in alternative market transactions, or increases the chances they will be susceptible to other predatory marketing schemes. Examples of this include the marketing of high-interest payday loans to financially unstable individuals, who may have no other options.

== Deception tactics ==
Many predatory advertisers rely on the use of demonstrably false or otherwise deceitful claims to coerce consumers into market transactions. These can be incredibly hard to classify and regulate as some claims may be true at face-value, but rely on either tactical omissions of information or the contextual circumstances of the individual to draw inferences that may be false. While many of these tactics may be somewhat natural (and accepted) within the advertising industry at-large, they can be predatory if used in certain contexts. Researchers have compiled a general classification of these tactics to better understand how they are used in the marketing landscape.

=== False statements ===
These include claims or presentations that are demonstrably false, often statistics or other empirical claims. For example, a for-profit college claims "98% of our graduates find employment within one month of graduation!" when in fact this is untrue.

=== Omission ===
Statements made about a product or service which fail to include material information that is relevant to the claim being made. For example, a commercial suggests that "clinical trials have proven the effectiveness of a product" when in fact the clinical trial measured the effectiveness of the product in a different context or metric that the one being advertised.

=== Implication ===
Statements that are made which may be true, but which are intended to lead the consumer to reach erroneous inferences. These may capitalize on a lack of information about the product or service, or the contextual environment of the consumer. They can be further classified as:

1. Ambiguous statements or claims, which utilize unclear language or narratives to suggest product superiority. For example, a claim is made that the product is a much "better" alternative to a similar product, but there is no metric for "better."
2. Atypical statements or claims, which cite results of product utilization that fall well outside of the normal outcome. For example, a diet pill company claims you can lose up to 30 pounds in one month, when the result is both unusual and/or achieved by other methods.
3. Conjectural statements or claims, which lack substantive evidence or cannot be made with certainty. For example, a commercial promises a "100% satisfaction guarantee" despite its being impossible to ensure.
4. Manipulative statements or claims, which cite characteristics of the product or service that may not differentiate it from market standards, but create an illusion of product superiority. For instance, a sugar soda may highlight that it is fat-free, when in fact all sodas contain no fat content.

== Accessing personal information ==
=== Data collection ===
The explosive growth of information technologies throughout the 21st century has brought with it entirely new privacy concerns, especially surrounding the collection and usage of personal data. As reliance on digital platforms has become almost necessary for participation in modern life, individuals have been asked to relinquish large amounts of personal information, either through direct submission or by inference from user engagement. Although access to personal information is generally agreed upon by participants, as outlined in end-user permissions agreements, questions of informed consent have brought forth numerous legislative efforts, including propositions to increase clarity in consent forms, as well as efforts to establish clear bounds of data usage.

The commodification of this data, which is highly valued across a number of sectors, has driven the exponential rise of a "data brokering" industry. Barring established industry norms and regulations (some of which can be hard to apply in the digital age), such as those in healthcare, finance, or other similarly protected sectors, data collected by individual entities like

or Facebook, as well as that collected by third party brokerage agencies such as Acxiom, can have a wide range of applications. Though many of these are relatively benign or even positive, often being utilized to tailor personalized user-experiences, the availability of such data to unethical marketers has inflamed problems of predatory advertising.

Data extraction and aggregation occurs over a vast network of platforms and businesses. Much of the information originates from discrete sources, including social media engagement, loyalty programs and purchasing history from online retailers, web browser queries, government records, and mobile application usage and preferences. Information gathered consists of many personal data points, ranging from available payment methods to health conditions. In the case of large technology platforms, especially for whom a large part of the revenue stream is composed of ad sales, this information may often be sold—either directly to advertisers or to third party brokerage firms. These firms specialize in the aggregation and categorization of data from a number of sources, which is then sold on the market to advertisers and other interested parties.

The process of categorization is especially important to understanding the avenues of exploitation made possible by comprehensive data aggregates. A 2013 report by the Federal Trade Commission found that data brokerage companies compiled individuals into groups with labels such as: "Zero Mobility," "Credit Crunched: City Families," "Rural and Barely Making It," "Enduring Hardships," and "Tough Start: Young Single Parents."

=== Algorithmic targeting ===
Whereas information pertaining to consumer vulnerabilities has been inferred through proxies for some time, such as the targeting of certain demographics based on specific television viewership, the drastic increase of direct access to information around the individual—especially coupled with methods of direct-to-consumer personalized advertisements—has intensified the accuracy and potency of predatory advertisement campaigns.

This information then allows advertisers to engage in online behavioral targeting, wherein advertisements are delivered to individuals based on personal information previously extracted from various sources. Complex algorithms, coupled with the aggregation of previously discrete data, have allowed advertisers to not only target increasingly precise individual characteristics, but also to draw inferences about individuals based on statistical corollaries requiring massive data sets. One consequence of this is that traditionally protected information, such as health outcomes, race, or private financial histories, can be inferred with greater certainty without ever collecting data on the specific item in question.

Once data has been collected, aggregated, and categorized, the connection between advertiser and consumer can be made. These are often fostered by intermediaries such as DoubleClick, a Google-owned company that offers marketers a wide range of websites to display their advertisements. The use of these intermediaries relieves websites of having to sell individual ad space, allowing algorithms to instead display personalized ads to users based on a complex mix of desirable metrics. This practice has sometimes been called "micro-targeting." While this process optimizes the ability to provide users with an individualized experience, it alleviates much of the culpability traditionally placed on ad-revenue dependent platforms to monitor their ad placements. Furthermore, when the algorithms are built using grouping labels such as those listed in the previous section (i.e. "Burdened by Debt: Singles"), advertisers looking to target and exploit specific characteristics can easily reach the most vulnerable populations.

It's important to note that the use of algorithms may result in such targeted advertisement despite being built without any malicious intent. Those utilizing Machine Learning will "train" themselves to display advertisements that result in user-engagement based on prior interactions, which may reinforce and increase the rate at which vulnerable populations receive advertisements that "speak" to those vulnerabilities.

== Common examples ==
=== For-profit colleges ===
The for-profit college industry has faced a number of lawsuits over the last decade, many of which surrounded their engagement in deceptive marketing campaigns. A study by the United States Government Accountability Office found that, of fifteen institutions selected, four engaged in outright fraudulent practices, while all fifteen were found to have made deceptive statements about enrollment, employment prospects, or tuition. While the advertisements were found to generally target low-income individuals, the large majority of marketing efforts were focused on veterans due to their access to G.I. Bill benefits. An executive order released during the Obama Administration found that following the post September 11 reinstatement of the Bill, which re-allocated funds towards higher education for veterans, for-profit institutions began aggressively targeting veterans and their families, with some institutions recruiting individuals with traumatic brain injuries as well as other deep emotional vulnerabilities. Much of the lead generation for these institutions is conducted using the data-driven instruments outlined above. Other studies have shown that for-profit institutions attract a disproportionate number of low-income minorities through advertisement practices that capitalize on dampened social mobility through the promise of career placement. Research found that a large portion of students who enrolled were not awarded degrees, despite having taken on debt to pursue them.

=== Predatory lending ===
Predatory lending is the process of granting high-interest loans with unfavorable terms to financially-distressed individuals. The data landscape has made these individuals much easier to find. As mentioned above, this information can be ascertained through a number of correlated online behaviors. For instance, those who regularly search for coupons, "fringe" financial institutions, or low-paying jobs in their search browser may be disproportionately targeted with advertisement for these loans. Research has shown that "fringe" financial institutions such as check cashing outlets (CCO's), payday lenders, and pawnbrokers have a disproportionate presence in low-income neighborhoods, especially when compared to the relative under-representation of mainstream financial institutions in the same localities. Some researchers have called this phenomenon "predatory inclusion," whereby the necessity for fringe institutions providing "alternative" services is only made possible through larger, structural socioeconomic dynamics. The mixture of lacking alternative resources and savvy targeting methods have resulted in major increases in the prevalence of such loans, especially following the Great Recession.

=== Political messaging ===
The use of data-driven micro-targeting has allowed politicians to tailor messages to specific individuals, speaking directly to the preferences, concerns, interests, and fears that they may have displayed through their online activity. While these practices may be largely benign, by allowing politicians to increase engagement by using individual names or campaigning on individually-relevant issues, critics have noted some disastrous effects on democratic processes. One of the most notable examples is the Cambridge Analytica scandal, wherein the consulting firm was found to have utilized large amounts of personal data to create highly-inflammatory targeted material, having purported impact on numerous international elections.

=== Grieving individuals ===
There have been many reports over the years of funeral homes capitalizing on the emotional vulnerability of individuals who had recently lost a loved one by selling them unnecessary services or marking-up the price on traditional funeral packages. The practice was so prevalent that the Federal Trade Commission passed a mandate, commonly known as the "Funeral Rule", which set forth multiple stipulations for funeral homes, such as the requirement of a "general price list" that consumers can access, so as to easily compare universal prices without having to inquire further.

=== Children/teens ===
Studies have shown that children are especially susceptible to advertising messaging, as most cannot recognize the persuasive nature of content as commercially motivated. While regulations have been put in place to dictate the manner in which children can be marketed to on television, child-targeted ad initiative in the internet have been harder to classify and regulate. A common example is the "adver-game," or, online games that utilize branded content to subliminally foster brand preference. These have been commonly used by large food industry conglomerates and have raised many concerns. Often, these games will use the company "spokescharacter" (i.e. Tony the Tiger) as the primary character in the game to build brand recognition. Another common tactic is the structuring of advergames so that the attainment of the product is the desired goal (as in, acquiring the candy bar or equivalent awards the player with a point value or prize). Researchers have shown that the reward mechanism associated with the acquisition of the virtual product often carries into the marketplace, ultimately influencing children's consumption patterns. Studies have shown a direct correlation between exposure to such advertisements and poor health outcomes due to the consumption of low-nutrient foods.

== Legality ==
=== Legislative measures ===
In the United States, many of the regulatory efforts put forth in response to predatory advertising practices, especially those involving the usage of personal data, have been spearheaded by the Federal Trade Commission. Congress too, has brought forth numerous legislative measures to address the informational asymmetry and privacy concerns of modern data-collection and advertising. Proponents of regulatory action have explained that data regulation can be exceptionally hard to craft for a number of reasons. Though many have called for greater transparency in data-collection efforts, critics claims that transparency alone falls short, as data is often repackaged and sold through many brokerage firms, leading to many uses that may not have been clearly outlined as the original purpose or intent. These critics suggest that direct parameters would be better placed on the operational uses of data in general. Opponents of regulatory reform say this would, perhaps unintentionally, drastically inhibit businesses ability to utilize the data for positive measures. Furthermore, because singular data points may be used across a large array of industries, sector-specific legislation may prove fruitless. To date, congress has introduced a few noteworthy bills, most of which were never passed:

- Consumer Privacy Protection Act of 2011 (Not Passed): Required data-collection entities, especially those involved in the sale and disclosure of personally identifiable information, to provide consumers notice upon any intent to use personal data for reasons unrelated to the original transaction. Also required outlined entities to provide consumers an option to request that their personal information not be used for any purposes outside of the transaction for up to five years. A similar version of the bill was introduced in 2015, but also died before making it to the vote.
- Commercial Privacy Bill of Rights Act of 2011 (Not Passed): Established parameters on the purposes for which data could be collected and placed further limitations on the length of time that data could be retained. Also established and FTC protocol that would require covered entities (those collection data on 5000+ U.S. citizens in the span of any year) to: 1) Give individuals notice about the use and storage of their personal information; 2) Provide individuals opportunities to "opt-out" of data collection, especially as used in behavioral advertising; 3) Provide avenues to fix inaccurate information; 4) Allow data points with personally identifiable characteristics to be rendered.
- Data Broker Accountability and Transparency Act of 2019 (Not Passed): Established requirements for entities that engage in the collections of personal data for the purposes of re-sale to third party entities. Also required that individuals be granted access to the information that is collected about themselves.

== See also ==
- For-profit higher education in the United States
