= Ad fatigue =

Declining effectiveness of advertising

In marketing, ad fatigue is the declining effectiveness of similar advertising to consumers due to fatigue leading to poor engagement. This wear out may vary between different advertisements due to factors such as the context, portrayal, and audience.

Factors such as the repetition and consistency of targeted ads shown to an individual can also influence when ad fatigue sets in.

Ad fatigue can be delayed through repetition variation.

Consumers are countering ad fatigue through ad blocking.

== Explanations of ad fatigue ==
=== Habituation ===
Habituation is a process in which repeated exposure to the same stimulus, such as an advertisement, leads to a decrease in response to that stimulus. Repeated exposure to similar advertisements decreases attention paid to them, making people less likely to engage with them, contributing to ad fatigue. Research has shown that higher exposure to repeated mobile advertisements increases the likelihood that the advertisements are ignored and decreases the person's involvement with the advertisement.

=== Selective attention ===
Selective attention refers to the process of people focusing on certain stimuli while ignoring others. By ignoring irrelevant stimuli, people are able to focus on the task at hand. In the context of advertising, selective attention can prevent the distraction of an advertisement from affecting a person's behaviour by allowing them to ignore advertisements. This process reduces the likelihood that similar advertisements will catch people's attention, contributing to ad fatigue.

This reduction in attention has been found in a study, who found that duration of attention significantly reduces when advertisements are repeated. They found that after three advertisements, the number of fixations on them significantly drops. In addition, from the first to the third advertisement exposure, the amount of attention paid to the advertisement reduced by 50%. This research indicates that repetition of advertisements reduces their effectiveness, contributing to ad fatigue.

=== Psychological reactance ===
The theory of psychological reactance suggests that if a person's behavioural freedoms are threatened, they will want to regain them. In the context of advertising, repeated exposure to similar advertisements can lead to psychological reactance, as the advertisements may be perceived as a barrier restricting autonomy. This may result in negative responses, such as perceiving the advertisement as intrusive. The increase in exposure to advertisements has been found to increase negative attitudes, as well as increase boredom. It has also been found that Facebook users who perceive a threat to their freedom react by blocking or hiding advertisements. These examples of psychological reactance are associated with ad fatigue, as they promote disengagement.

=== Mere exposure effect and overexposure ===
The mere exposure effect suggests that the repeated exposure of a person to a certain stimulus enhances their attitude toward it. In advertising contexts, it has been found that exposure to animated advertisements lead to positive engagement through the mere exposure effect. However, excessive exposure can lead to the opposite occurring, contributing to ad fatigue. Additional exposures can have adverse effects, often referred to as wear-out. Therefore, liking an advertisement increases up to a point and then decreases as repetition continues, creating an inverted U-shape. This inverted U-shape has been found especially for advertisements that are boring and irrelevant.

== Examples of ad fatigue ==
On platforms such as Instagram or Facebook, advertisements being repeated within a short period lead people to scroll past them, and therefore not engage with the similar advertisements. It has also been found that more than three mobile advertisements in a day interrupts people, making them likely to ignore the message. Additionally, it has been found that repeated TV commercials lead to wear-out in people's evaluations of the commercials, and with more repetition, people are less likely to attend to the message. These findings indicate that similar advertisements, across different advertising media, decline in effectiveness.

Research has shown that repetition of advertisements in a television news program led to wear-out, particularly for unfamiliar brands. Advertisements for unfamiliar brands have been found to wear out more quickly than those for familiar brands. This indicates that ad fatigue may vary depending on factors such as brand familiarity.

== Criticisms ==
A criticism of ad fatigue is that there is often an overemphasis on repetition. Research has shown that repeated exposure to creative advertisements does not lead to ad fatigue. In addition, attention wear-out has been observed for static advertisements but not animated ones. These findings indicate that repetition alone may not explain the declining effectiveness of advertisements, and that other factors such as advertising design may play a bigger role.

However, other studies indicate contrasting results. Creative advertisements have been found to lead to wear-out, but this effect is delayed and diminished. This suggests that ad fatigue still occurs under repeated exposure, but its effects vary depending on the context.

Another criticism of ad fatigue is how it is measured. Research on the effectiveness of advertisements frequently uses clickthrough rates. However, there may be a delay between advertisement exposure and behaviour, such as purchasing the advertised product. Consequently, a declining clickthrough rate does not necessarily translate to reduced engagement or ad fatigue. In addition, studies have shown that important shifts in attitudes can be observed even without clickthrough.
