= Attention economy =

Economic view of human attention as a commodity

The attention economy refers to the incentives of advertising-driven companies, in particular, to maximize the time and attention their users give to their product.

Attention economics is an approach to the management of information that treats human attention as a scarce commodity and applies economic theory to solve various information management problems.

== Description ==
According to Matthew Crawford, "Attention is a resource—a person has only so much of it."

Thomas H. Davenport and John C. Beck define attention, in economic terms, as follows:

Attention is focused mental engagement on a particular item of information. Items come into our awareness, we attend to a particular item, and then we decide whether to act.

The economic value of time can be quantified and compared to monetary expenditures. According to Erik Brynjolfsson, Seon Tae Kim and Joo Hee Oh, this allows formal analysis of the attention economy and to quantify values of free goods.

== Theory ==
Research from a wide range of disciplines including psychology, cognitive science, neuroscience, and economics, suggest that humans have limited cognitive resources that can be used at any given time, when resources are allocated to one task, the resources available for other tasks will be limited. Given that attention is a cognitive process that involves the selective concentration of resources on a given item of information, to the exclusion of other perceivable information, attention can be considered in terms of limited processing resources.

=== History ===
The concept of attention economics was first theorized by psychologist and economist Herbert A. Simon when he wrote about the scarcity of attention in an information-rich world in 1971:

[I]n an information-rich world, the wealth of information means a dearth of something else: a scarcity of whatever it is that information consumes. What information consumes is rather obvious: it consumes the attention of its recipients. Hence a wealth of information creates a poverty of attention and a need to allocate that attention efficiently among the overabundance of information sources that might consume it.

He noted that many designers of information systems incorrectly represented their design problem as information scarcity rather than attention scarcity, and as a result, they built systems that excelled at providing more and more information to people, when what was really needed were systems that excelled at filtering out unimportant or irrelevant information.

Simon's characterization of the problem of information overload as an economic one has become increasingly popular in analyzing information consumption since the mid-1990s, when writers such as Thomas H. Davenport and Michael Goldhaber adopted terms like "attention economy" and "economics of attention".

Some writers have speculated that transactions based on attention will replace financial transactions as the focus of economic system. For example, Goldhaber wrote in 1997: "...transactions in which money is involved may be growing in total number, but the total number of global attention transactions is growing even faster." For a 1999 essay, Georg Franck argued "income in attention ranks above financial success" for advertising-based media like magazines and television. Information systems researchers have also adopted the idea, and are beginning to investigate mechanism designs which build on the idea of creating property rights in attention (see Applications).

In 2022, Rice University professor Adrian Lenardic and two co-authors wrote for BigThink that attention economics adversely affected scientific research: "The attention a scientist's work gains from the public now plays into its perceived value. Scientists list media exposure counts on résumés, and many PhD theses now include the number of times a candidate's work has appeared in the popular science press. Science has succumbed to the attention economy." They add that study results are publicized without proper peer input or reproducibility.

== Negative externalities ==
In economic theory, market exchanges may have unintended consequences, called externalities, that are not reflected in the price consumers pay upfront. When these consequences have a negative effect on an uninvolved third party, they are called negative externalities, with pollution being a common example. The attention economy generates negative externalities for society that impact both individuals and communities.

=== Social media addiction and mental health impacts ===
One negative externality of the attention economy is social media addiction. Given the monetization of human attention, social media platforms are designed to maximize user engagement, namely by influencing the brain's reward system. When users receive positive feedback on social media or view novel content, their brains release dopamine, leading them to stay on the platform for extended periods and return repeatedly. Social media addiction has been linked to negative mental health outcomes such as depression, anxiety, and low self-esteem.

The Netflix documentary The Social Dilemma illustrates how algorithms from search engines and social media platforms negatively affect users while maximizing online engagement.

=== Amplification of disinformation ===
During the 2010s, social media in conjunction with online advertising technologies inspired significant growth in the business model of the attention economy. A study conducted by researchers at Hanken School of Economics found that when the attention economy is paired with online advertising, the resulting financial arrangement can lead to the circulation of fake news and the amplification of disinformation for profit.

=== Surveillance capitalism and ethical considerations ===
Another negative externality of the attention economy is the rise of surveillance capitalism, which describes the practice of companies collecting personal data to buy and sell for profit.

To capture user attention, companies collect data — such as demographics and behavioral patterns — and use it to create personalized user experiences that align with their interests based on the obtained data. Companies also sell this data to third parties, often without the user's informed consent. These practices raise ethical concerns about privacy, misuse of data, and misrepresentation of communities.

== Attention for marginalized communities ==
Within the attention economy, engagement metrics influence the visibility of content and narratives. Algorithms in the attention economy are designed to maximize engagement, often prioritizing content that resonates with dominant cultural identities. As a result, marginalized groups may face challenges in having representation of their perspectives and concerns. For example, Black creators on platforms such as TikTok have reported that their content had significant reductions in engagement after posting about the Black Lives Matter Movement, suggesting that they were shadow banned. Furthermore, limiting the visibility of marginalized creators reduces the amount of attention they receive. This, in turn, hinders their ability to engage in activism and spread awareness about issues affecting their community to the broader public.

== Intangibles ==
According to digital culture expert Kevin Kelly, by 2008, the attention economy was increasingly one where the consumer product costs virtually nothing to reproduce and the problem facing the supplier of the product lies in adding valuable intangibles that cannot be reproduced at any cost. He identifies these intangibles as:

1. Immediacy – priority access, immediate delivery
2. Personalization – tailored just for you
3. Interpretation – support and guidance
4. Authenticity – how can you be sure it is the real thing?
5. Accessibility – wherever, whenever
6. Embodiment – books, live music
7. Patronage – "paying simply because it feels good"
8. Findability – "When there are millions of books, millions of songs, millions of films, millions of applications, millions of everything requesting our attention—and most of it free—being found is valuable."

== Social attention, collective attention ==
Attention economics is also relevant to the social sphere. Specifically, long-term attention can be understood as the attention people devote to managing their interactions with others. Dedicating too much attention to these interactions can lead to "social interaction overload", i.e. when people are overwhelmed in managing their relationships with others, for instance in the context of social network services in which people are the subject of a high level of social solicitations. Digital media and the internet facilitate participation in this economy by creating new channels for distributing attention. Ordinary people are now empowered to reach a wide audience by publishing their own content and commenting on others' content.

Social attention can also be associated to collective attention, i.e. how "attention to novel items propagates and eventually fades among large populations".

== Applications ==
=== In advertising ===
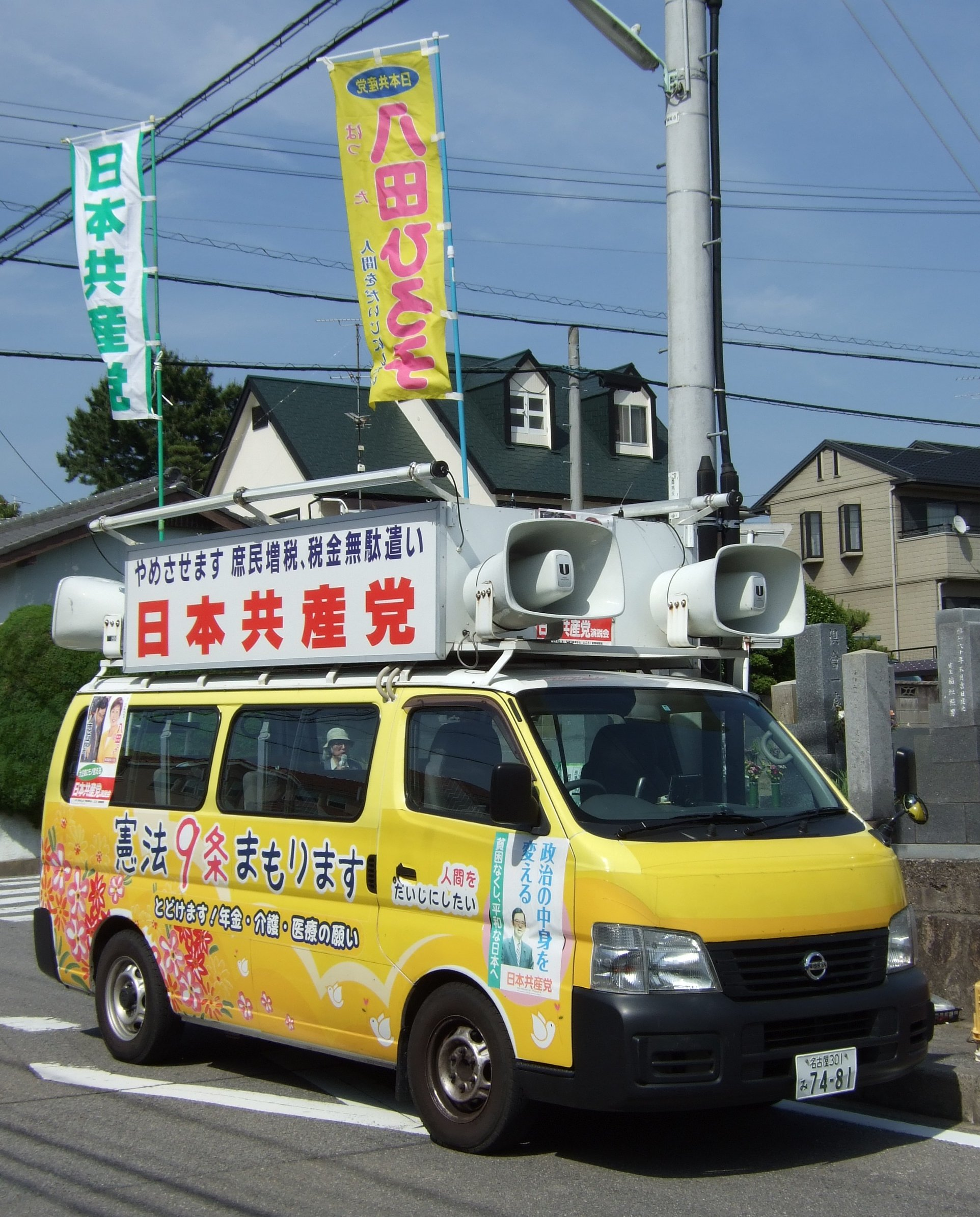
Sound trucks, like this one in Japan, involuntarily occupy the attention of those who hear them, an example of attention theft.

"Attention economics" treats a potential consumer's attention as a resource. Traditional media advertisers followed a model that suggested consumers went through a linear process they called AIDA (attention, interest, desire and action). Attention is therefore a major and the first stage in the process of converting non-consumers. Since the cost to transmit advertising to consumers has become sufficiently low given that more ads can be transmitted to a consumer (e.g. via online advertising) than the consumer can process, the consumer's attention becomes the scarce resource to be allocated. As such, a superfluidity of information may hinder an individual's decision-making who keeps searching and comparing products as long as it promises to provide more than it is using up.

Advertisers that produce attention-grabbing content that is presented to unconsenting consumers without compensation have been criticized for perpetrating attention theft. The commercialization of attention also occurs in physical spaces. Focus Media describes its elevator advertisements as "high-attention" and "low-interference", citing the enclosed and relatively distraction-free environment of elevators. In 2025, Kong Junyou, a student at Shanghai University, protested this model through a filmed five-day action in which he shut down more than 100 residential elevator advertising screens.

=== Controlling information pollution ===
One application treats various forms of information (e.g. spam, advertising) as a form of pollution or 'detrimental externality'. In economics, an externality is a by-product of a production process that imposes burdens (or supplies benefits), to parties other than the intended consumer of a commodity. For example; air and water pollution are 'negative' externalities that impose burdens on society and the environment.

A market-based approach to controlling externalities was outlined in Ronald Coase's The Problem of Social Cost (1960). This evolved from an article on the Federal Communications Commission (1959), in which Coase claimed that radio-frequency interference is a negative externality that could be controlled by the creation of property rights.

Coase's approach to the management of externalities requires the careful specification of property rights and a set of rules for the initial allocation of the rights. Once these rights are specified and allocated, a market mechanism can theoretically manage the externality problem.

==== E-mail spam ====
Sending huge numbers of e-mail messages costs spammers very little, since the costs of e-mail messages are spread out over the internet service providers that distribute them (and the recipients who must spend attention dealing with them). Thus, sending out as much spam as possible is a rational strategy: even if only 0.001% of recipients (1 in 100,000) is converted into a sale, a spam campaign can be profitable. Of course, it is very difficult to understand where all the revenue comes from since these businesses are run through proxy servers. However, if they were not profitable, it is reasonable to conclude that they would not be sending spam. Spammers are demanding valuable attention from potential customers, but avoid paying a fair price for this attention due to the current architecture of e-mail systems.

One way this might be mitigated is through the implementation of "Sender Bond" whereby senders are required to post a financial bond that is forfeited if enough recipients report an email as spam.

Closely related is the idea of selling "interrupt rights", or small fees for the right to demand one's attention. The cost of these rights could vary according to the person who is interrupted: interrupt rights for the CEO of a Fortune 500 company would presumably be extraordinarily expensive, while those of a high school student might be lower. Costs could also vary for an individual depending on context, perhaps rising during the busy holiday season and falling during the dog days of summer. Those who are interrupted could decline to collect their fees from friends, family, and other welcome interrupters.

Another idea in this vein is the creation of "attention bonds", small warranties that some information will not be a waste of the recipient's time, placed into escrow at the time of sending. Like the granters of interrupt rights, receivers could cash in their bonds to signal to the sender that a given communication was a waste of their time or elect not to cash them in to signal that more communication would be welcome.

==== Web spam ====
As search engines have become a primary means for finding and accessing information on the web, high rankings in the results for certain queries have become valuable commodities, due to the ability of search engines to focus searchers' attention. Like other information systems, web search is vulnerable to pollution: "Because the Web environment contains profit seeking ventures, attention getting strategies evolve in response to search engine algorithms".

Since most major search engines now rely on some form of PageRank (recursive counting of hyperlinks to a site) to determine search result rankings, a gray market in the creation and trading of hyperlinks has emerged. Participants in this market engage in a variety of practices known as link spamming, link farming, and reciprocal linking.

Another issue, similar to the issue discussed above of whether or not to consider political e-mail campaigns as spam, is what to do about politically motivated link campaigns or Google bombs. Currently, the major search engines do not treat these as web spam, but this is a decision made unilaterally by private companies.

=== Sales lead generation ===
Software applications either explicitly or implicitly take attention economy into consideration in their user interface design based on the realization that if it takes the user too long to locate something, they will find it through another application. This is done, for instance, by creating filters to make sure viewers are presented with information that is most relevant, of interest, and personalized based on past web search history.

The paid inclusion model, as well as more pervasive advertising networks like Yahoo! Publisher Network and Google's AdSense, work by treating consumer attention as the property of the search engine (in the case of paid inclusion) or the publisher (in the case of advertising networks). This is somewhat different from the anti-spam uses of property rights in attention, which treat an individual's attention as his or her own property.

These advertising models significantly influence consumer behavior, often leveraging personal data to target ads more effectively. While this can enhance user experience by aligning advertisements with user interests, it raises privacy concerns and can lead to consumer manipulation. The phenomenon of "ad fatigue" where excessive exposure to ads leads to reduced attention and engagement with advertisements is also noteworthy.

Advancements in artificial intelligence and machine learning have transformed paid inclusion and advertising networks. These technologies allow for more sophisticated targeting and personalization of ads, improving effectiveness but also increasing concerns about surveillance and data privacy.

The regulation of paid inclusion and advertising networks is complex, involving multiple stakeholders with diverse interests. There is an ongoing debate about the balance between encouraging innovation and protecting consumer privacy. Ethical considerations also include the transparency of these models and their impact on the informational ecosystem, potentially leading to biased or manipulated content.

== See also ==
- Attention (disambiguation)
- Attention inequality
- Attention management
- Center for Humane Technology
- Clickbait
- Cognitive Surplus
- Competition (economics)
- Continuous partial attention
- Fearmongering
- Imagination Age
- Information explosion
- Information society
- Intention economy
- Mediatization
- Netocracy
- Post-scarcity
- Sensationalism
- TL;DR
- The Magical Number Seven, Plus or Minus Two (paper)
