= Attention theft =

Concept in marketing and psychology

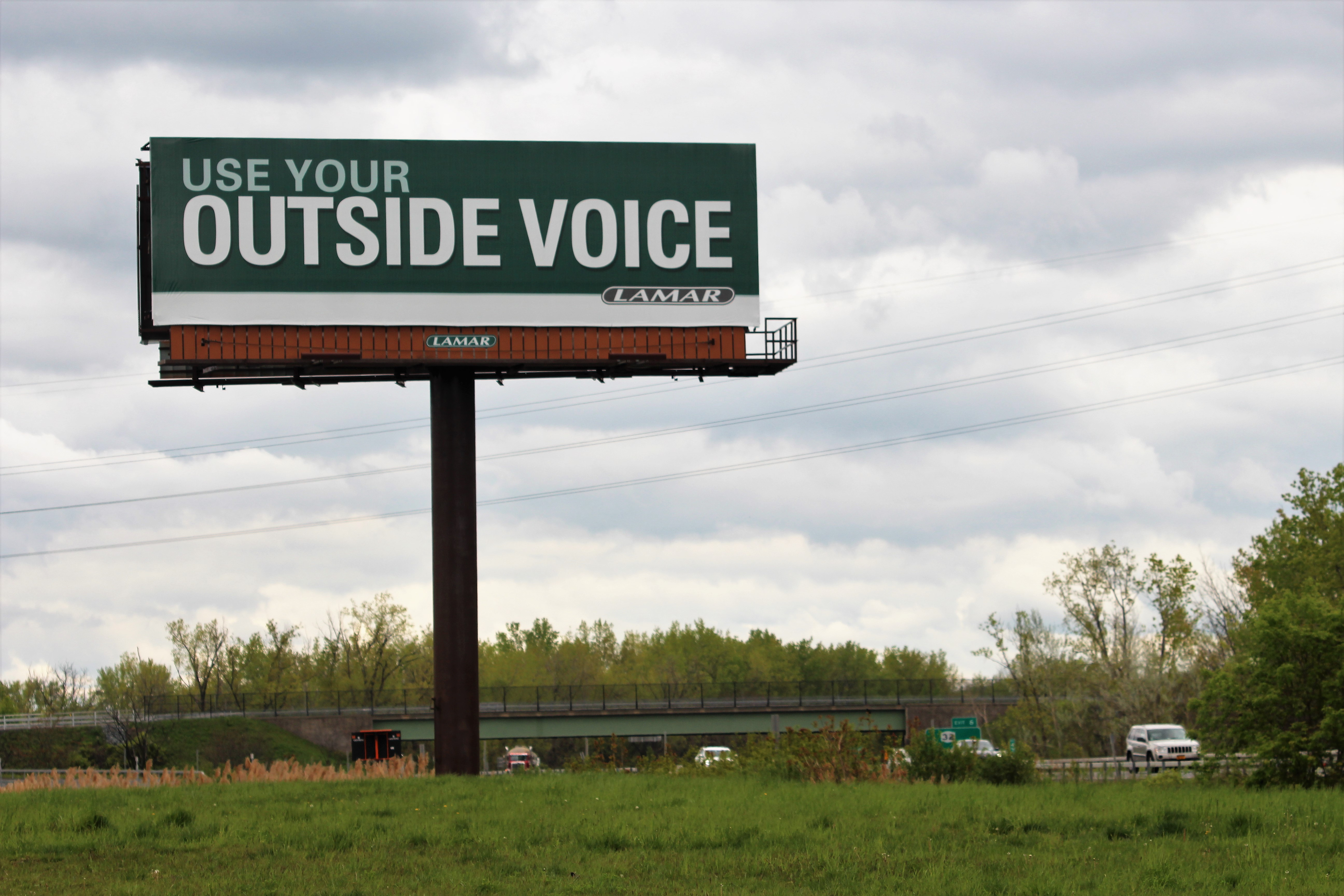
Billboards are a commonly cited example of attention theft.

Attention theft is a theory in economic sociology and psychology which describes situations in which marketers serve advertisements to consumers who have not consented to view them and who are given nothing in return. Perpetrators seek to distract targets' attention through the use of advertising content, thereby achieving a form of manipulation.

Attention theft has been criticized as an example of unethical marketing. It is related to the concept of the attention economy, which posits that attention is a scarce resource and applies economic theory to it.

== Psychological basis ==
People are susceptible to attention theft because they tend by default to pay attention to whatever stimuli in their environment are most noticeable, a phenomenon known in psychology as exogenous orienting. Advertisers can serve content deliberately engineered to be distracting, making it difficult to ignore. Examples of this type of content can include bold animations, crowded designs, and frequent or unnecessary notifications.

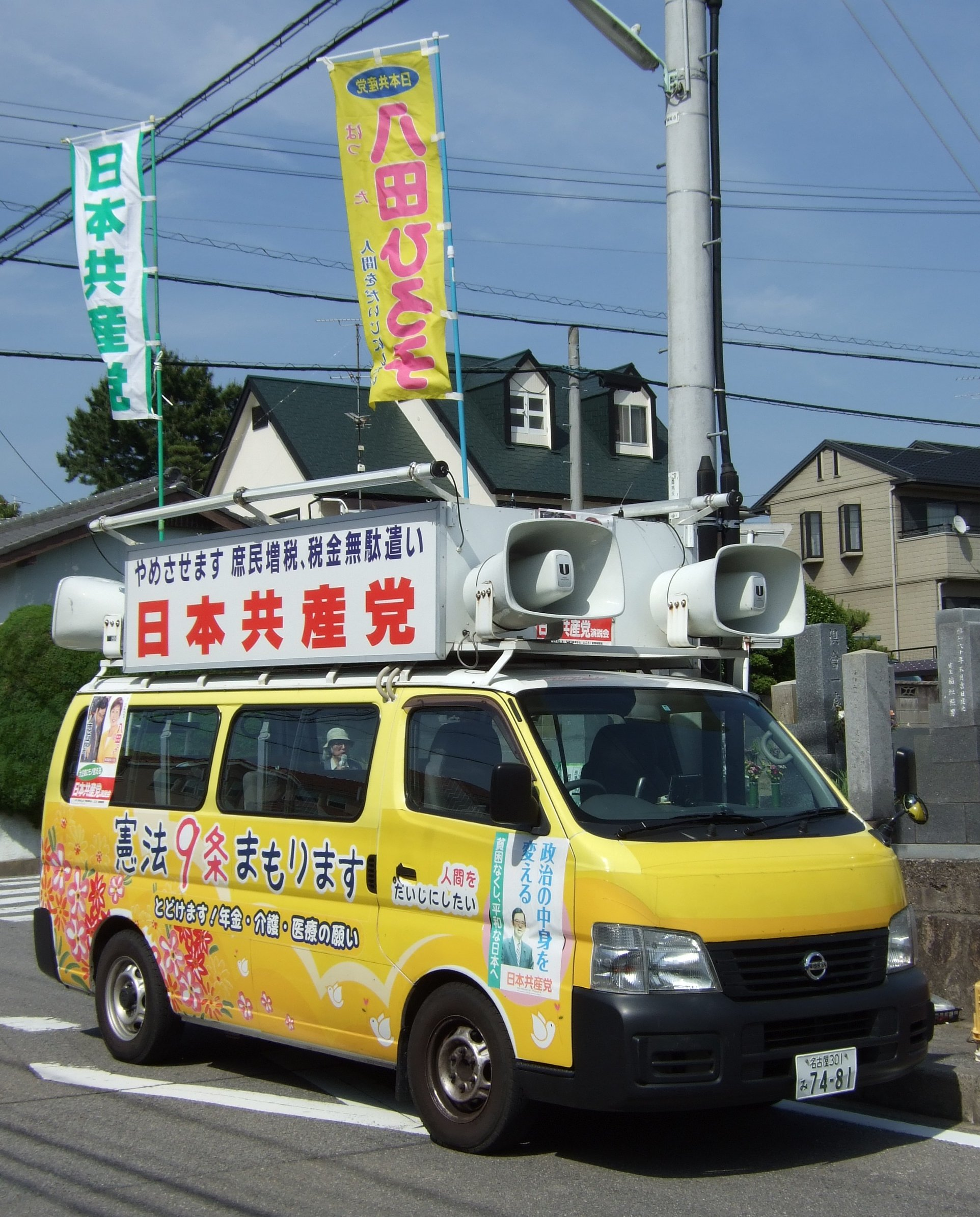
Sound trucks are frequently used in Japan to broadcast political or commercial messages in residential neighbourhoods.

== Examples ==
Commonly cited examples of attention theft include billboards, apps that send out promotional notifications, sound trucks, email spam, and TV screens with mostly or entirely promotional content in locations with a captive audience, such as gas stations, airplanes, waiting rooms, and taxis.A 2025 dispute in Shanghai concerned advertising directed at a captive audience in residential elevators. Kong Junyou, a student at Shanghai University, shut down more than 100 advertising screens without damaging them, arguing that the loud and unavoidable commercials deprived residents of moments of calm and occupied their attention. Reporting on the action also raised concerns that residential advertising screens had been installed without residents' consent.

== Criticism ==
Critics of attention theft characterize it as a type of unethical marketing. They argue that it contributes to information overload, leading to negative health outcomes, and infringes upon freedom of thought. Writing in Wired in 2017, legal scholar Tim Wu urged municipal governments to pass laws prohibiting some instances of attention theft. He and others fear that imminent technological advances may increase the pervasiveness of the phenomenon.

== See also ==
- Attention economy
- Digital zombie
- Information pollution
- Red herring
- Time sink
