= Artery Gear: Fusion =

- The app icon, depicting Sirius.
- Developer: Access!
- Publishers: CN/JP/WW: bilibili; TW: Komoe Game
- Composers: Vanguard Sound; GhostFinal
- Series: Artery Gear
- Engine: Unity
- Platforms: Android, iOS
- Release: CHN: May 27, 2021; JP: November 18, 2021; TW: April 21, 2022; WW: June 14, 2022
- Genre: RPG
- Mode: Single player

Artery Gear: Fusion (Chinese: 机动战姬：聚变, Japanese: アーテリーギア-機動戦姫-, Korean: 아터리 기어: 퓨전) was a turn-based roleplaying game developed by Access! and published by bilibili on Android and iOS platforms. It is the second installment in the Artery Gear series and the spiritual successor to Armor Girls: Z Battle, using several characters from the previous title in a separate story.

The game was released in China in May 2021, in Japan on November 18, 2021, in Taiwan on April 21, 2022, and globally on June 14, 2022. It would end service worldwide on November 12, 2024.

== Gameplay ==
Combat in Artery Gear: Fusion, displaying the units in battle.

Artery Gear: Fusion is a turn-based role-playing game where players take the role of a Commander who can build a lineup of characters and control a team of up to four characters called Artery Gears (AGs) in turn-based combat. Each of these AGs have various stats that affect their strengths, a color that determines the damage dealt to targets and damage taken by targets of the other colors, a class that determines their combat role, and a set of unique abilities called Skills that are used in combat. These AGs can equip a set of six various items called Gears in order to improve their stats as well. Some AGs can unlock special items called Exclusive Armaments which can enhance their Skills or provide new abilities and effects entirely.

The game also has a Fleet system that gives you access to a set of ships that lets you passively collect game resources and interact with chibi versions of the game's characters to increase their affinity with the player.

These AGs are primarily acquired through a gacha mechanic. The game's premium currency, Forging Crystals, can be earned both by playing the game and via real money in-app purchases. These Forging Crystals are primarily used to purchase Recruitment Passes in order to "Recruit" them, and this currency can also be acquired through gameplay progression or events.

== Story ==
=== Setting and characters ===
The game is set in a sci-fi post-apocalyptic future Earth, where a horde of zombie-like machines known as Puppets have overrun the world and laid waste to countless cities across the world. After the fall of civilization, only two main forces would remain, the Frontier, an alliance of the remaining nations, and the independent monarchy on a moon orbital colony called Autoluna, would join forces to fight back against the Puppet invaders in what would later be called the Puppet Wars, and in doing so, create the Artery Gear project.

The Artery Gears are a group of cybernetically enhanced humans equipped with the most advanced technology of Earth, with measures to be more effective at fighting the Puppets. The first Artery Gear, Nio, would be used as a template for all other Artery Gears to be built off of.

Along with the creation of the AGs would soon come the creation of the Union as a joint organization with the sole purpose of battling against the Puppets, led by the Commander of The Union and primarily ran on their flagship, the Autoland.

The protagonist is the Commander of the Union, and the character the player plays as, which can have one of four different appearances.

The primary antagonists are the Puppets and their underlying Puppet Network, a hive mind that connect them all together to continue to bring chaos to the world, and Grafframe, a group of rogue AGs who oppose the Puppet War, by any means necessary. The Puppets are led by the Puppet Masters, high level Puppets who control hordes of Puppets and show some level of autonomy in their actions. Later on in the story, a more powerful version of Puppet Masters would be displayed with beings called Subpuppets, smaller networks of Puppets who resist the changes in the Puppet Network.

=== Plot ===
==== Season One ====
Nio, alongside several other AGs would descend to Earth from escape pods from Autoluna down to the Autoland to defeat the Puppets that have overrun the ship. A high level Puppet Master attacks the squad, nearly overwhelming them before the player emerges to give them the chance to defeat it. This would catch the attention of Atlas (the head of the Frontier), and help officially appoint them as the Commander of the Union, assigning them Capella as the second in command.

The Union first visits Azure City, a city overrun with Puppets under control of the Puppet Master Harpist. Aided by a mysterious AG by the name of 04, the Union defeats them, only to be assigned an investigation by Atlas of a traitor in their ranks. Clarice (a new recruit of Grafframe with an obsession with the Commander of the Union) would act as a medic among the chaos and escape before the real traitor was caught. Meanwhile, the Union would be briefed on their next targets, the first on the list being Deepone, located in Felcana City. Despite Grafframe's continued interference, thanks to the help of the Frontier, the Union would defeat Deepone. After the Union travelled to Tanakh City to help Atlas successfully defeat a Puppet horde, they would be contacted by Lisa Autoluna (the Queen of Autoluna) and granted an AG from L'Ordre de l'Autoluna (the order of knight AGs that protect Autoluna) to assist the Union as the Frontier and Autoluna make preparations for a meeting.

Meanwhile, Clarice helps lead the Fallen Knight (another Puppet Master) towards Tanakh City while the meeting is underway, and with the combined help of the Frontier, Autoluna, and the Union, are able to defeat the Fallen Knight. As the Union makes their way to Aurenberg fight the Iron Cage (another Puppet Master), a young girl called Fiel descends from Autoluna to document the war. With Clarice's help, the Union would defeat the Iron Cage, at the price of Capella's life. After the battle, Nio would reveal that she is Puppetized (turning into a Puppet) and with the sudden help from Grafframe, follow their coordinates to meet another Puppet Master at Norilsk.

==== Season Two ====
When the Union arrives, they would meet the Twins, a special Puppet Master who controls Puppets that aren't hostile, trying to revive Capella and save Nio. However, when the Commander of the Union offers themselves to be Puppetized to help control Nio, Nio loses control and kills the Twins, succumbing to Puppetization as the Commander of the Union begins to explain why he continues to defend her.

The player is then taken back to six years before, when the Commander of the Union was just a volunteer soldier, where they explain how they were close to Nio and Clarice throughout the First Puppet War, as well as how Lisa took the throne of Autoluna from Anna Autoluna (the first Queen of Autoluna) and rose to power. Now back to the present, by the Commander of the Union's order, the Puppetized Nio kills the Commander of the Union. Following this, Lisa Autoluna would order for some satellite weapons to be fired on the base in Norilsk, killing everyone present within the impact. Shortly after, Lisa would awaken the Mother of Luna (Anna Autoluna, revived as a Puppet Master-like entity under Lisa's control) and user her to control the citizens of Sky Port. Meanwhile, the still alive Nio would converse with the Puppet Network while Atlas helps try to wake Nio up and restore Fiel's memories, before being shot and killed by an assassin of Autoluna. With the help of everyone still alive, Nio would transform into the Puppet Emperor, gaining control of the Puppet Network and reviving everyone who died from the satellite weapons used earlier, and Capella. With her newfound power, she would destroy the Mother of Luna. The Commander of the Union would be revived separately by Clarice, who depending on the player's choice would live or die afterwards.

==== Season Three ====
As the Union plans to fly to Autoluna, they would be stopped by the remnants of the Frontier trying to contain and control Nio. Outraged by this, once the Frontier gathered for a meeting with her, she would kill all of the high ranking members of the Frontier that remained. Meanwhile, the Union would be attacked by a Subpuppet, who would be swiftly defeated before they fly to Autoluna. The Union would then confront Lisa herself, succeeding in killing her initially, however Lisa would transform into a Subpuppet-like being and destroy the palace. With the help of all of the AGs and their respective factions, and Fiel's sacrifice, Lisa would seemingly be defeated, before collapsing into a black hole that consumes everyone on Autoluna. After reliving their memories, the Commander of the Union would be judged by the "Executor of Eternal Reincarnation" before being rescued by a transformed Rela. Afterwards, the Union would celebrate the end of the Second Puppet War with a celebratory photo.

== Release and promotion ==
=== Release ===
Artery Gear: Fusion would be first publicly announced in late 2018 where Otaku Games would announce the game on the game's official Weibo account. After two years of further development, bilibili would showcase the game on July 31 at a launch event. On August 20, 2020, the Chinese version would launch its first closed beta which lasted for 8 days. After 11 months of development, the Chinese version would release in open beta in May 2021, reaching 3 million pre-registrations from the website ahead of the open beta. Following this, the Japanese release would be announced in August 2021, with closed beta and pre-registrations beginning later that month. The Japanese version reached 500,000 pre-registrations ahead of release. Closed beta and pre-registrations for the global release began in May 2022, and launched globally in June 2022.

The first season of the Chinese version ended in August 2021, with the Japanese version ending in January 2022, and the global version in September 2022, with ten episodes. The second season began releasing in November 2021 for the Chinese version, April 2022 for the Japanese version, and the global version in October 2022. The second season ran for four episodes until December 2022 for the Chinese version, and May 2023 for both Japanese and global versions. The third season began releasing March 2023 in the Chinese version, and June 2023 for the other versions, running until the servers shut down for each respective region, running for up to four episodes.

In March 2024, Access announced that the Korean server would no longer receive content updates after the event that started on April 11th of that year. In July 2024, Access announced that the remaining servers would receive their final updates on July 16 for the Chinese server, and July 18 for the remaining servers, including the fourth and final closing chapter of the third season. The game was delisted from the App Store and Google Play on August 13, and ended worldwide service on November 12, 2024.

=== Collaborations ===
Starting in December 2021, bilibili would begin their series of collaborations, starting with the video game Atelier Ryza: Ever Darkness & the Secret Hideout, in which the characters Reisalin "Ryza" Stout, Klaudia Valentz and Lila Decyrus would be added to the game as temporary recruitment banners. Following this in April 2022, bilibili would announce a collaboration with the Japanese manga and model kit series Frame Arms Girl, adding the characters Gourai, Stylet, and Baselard as temporary recruitment banners within the game. In November 2022, bilibili would announce a second collaboration with the series, additionally adding Jinrai, the Materia Sisters, Architect, and Hresvelgr as temporary recruitment banners as well as rerunning the first collaboration.

In June 2022, bilibili announced a collaboration with the Japanese anime television series Madoka Magica, with the characters Madoka Kaname, Homura Akemi, Mami Tomoe, Sayaka Miki, and Kyoko Sakura being added to the game as temporary recruitment banners. A year later, bilibili would announce a collaboration with Nijisanji and the Vtuber Finana Ryuga, adding her into the game as a free character for a limited time, being the only character in the game to use English voicelines. Four months after that collaboration, bilibili would announce an additional collaboration with the video game Final Gear, which added the character Corallium as a temporary recruitment banner in September. Seven months later in April 2024, bilibili would announce that the game would be collaborating with the video game series Hyperdimension Neptunia, adding the characters Neptune (referred to as Purple Heart), Noire (referred to as Black Heart), and Nepgear as temporary recruitment banners.

In February 2025, bilibili would announce a collaboration with Artery Gear: Fusion for a collab with the game Higan: Eruthyll's Chinese version, in which the characters Hokuto and Alma would be added to the game as temporary banners, despite Artery Gear: Fusion having been shut down in every region before this collab.

== Reception ==
Reception

Review scores
Publication	Score
Pocket Gamer	4.5/5
BunnyGaming.com	6/10
Hardcore iOS	3.5/5
AppGamer	4.3/5
GamingonPhone	7.5/10

Pocket Gamer highlights the Quality-of-Life features and generous gacha system, but notes that there were translation issues and lack of gender variety. BunnyGaming.com echoes the translation issues and criticized the poor gacha pity system, but praises the game's visuals and auto-play features. Hardcore iOS remarks that "resource grinding and farming is one of the spots where improvements can be made," but otherwise considers Artery Gear: Fusion as "a decent timesink." AppGamer would highlight the good visuals and generous starting rewards, but would offer concerns over optimization. GamingonPhone would echo the praise of the visuals and auto-play features, but would have their own set of concerns with the story feeling "boring" at points, and the stamina system.
