= Hanft =

Hanft is a surname. Notable people with the surname include:

- Adam Hanft, brand strategist
- Helen Hanft (1934–2013), American actress
- Karl Hanft (1904–1982), Austrian actor
- Steve Hanft (born 1966), American film and video director
