= Cocooning (behaviour) =

Staying inside one's home out of fear

Cocooning is staying inside one's home, insulated from perceived danger, instead of going out. The term was coined in 1981 by Faith Popcorn, a trend forecaster and marketing consultant. It is used in social science, marketing, parenting, economic forecasting, self-help, religion, and has become part of standard English as defined by multiple dictionaries.

== History ==
Evidence of intensifying home-focused behavior became more pronounced in Popcorn's data from 1984, and by 1985 she forecast it would be a trend, not a fad. She explained the concept involves building a "shell of safety" around oneself in a 1986 article in The New Yorker.

In 1987, The Washington Post columnist George Will explained that "the harassments of daily life -- looming nuclear incineration, rude waiters -- have driven people to ''cocooning''. They have gone to ground in their dens with their VCRs and compact-disc players, snug in their Barcaloungers equipped with stereo headphones, the better to keep at bay the modern world, the discontinuities of which have produced a longing for tradition."

A Los Angeles Times article in 1987 called "The Essence of Cocooning: It's a Desire for a Cozy, Perfect Environment Far From the Influences of a Madding World" tied the concept to fear of environmental destruction. In the article, Popcorn cited the increased use of gourmet frozen foods, soft furniture such as Barcaloungers, investment services, and "mom foods" that remind consumers of adolescence, as examples of cocooning behavior. She cited less involvement in social and political issues as a downside of cocooning, though she predicted a counter-trend to emerge.

The term was designated in 1987 by the editors of the American Heritage Dictionary of the English Language as a word being tracked for possible inclusion in the dictionary. The dictionary's editors later included it, as did Merriam Webster's Dictionary.

A 1989 article in The New York Times called "Lounge Wear for Cocooning" described a trend among many upscale designers, including Ralph Lauren, Bob Mackie, Giorgio Armani and Valentino, to create clothing for use at home that was more dressy than sleepwear but less formal than sportswear. "However, sleeping is not the point. Neither, necessarily, is seduction. Cocooning, a dream word for market researchers, is. Everybody is working. Everybody is tired. Everybody just wants to go home and watch 48-inch TV. Relax, slip into something comfortable, and join the ranks of homebody chic," the article says.

In its 1996 "Year in Review" article, Time cited cocooning as a major social trend and linked it to Bowling Alone, a 1995 essay by Harvard Professor Robert Putnam, describing a decrease in in-person social intercourse.

Shortly after the September 11 attacks, the Chicago Tribune ran an article entitled "The 'cocooning' trend draws reinforcement" which asserted that the terrorist attacks intensified cocooning.

A study by sociologists at the University of Toronto in 2004 concluded that Canadians were socializing less with their friends and family and spending more time "cocooning" home alone. The change was attributed to "higher rates of separation and divorce, smaller households with fewer children, delayed marriages and more individuals living alone."

In 2013, a USA Today article entitled "Cocooning: It's back and thanks to tech, it's bigger" concluded that cocooning had turned into "super-cocooning": "Thanks to always-on wireless Internet connectivity and bigger, better TVs that reproduce pixel-perfect high-definition video, cocooning is entering a new evolutionary stage. Consumers are staying home more, watching movies delivered via cable, satellite, Internet or disc, eating in and transforming their apartments and houses into a shelter from the daily social storm."

In Fortune in 2015, Popcorn said "uber-cocooning, and now even bunkering" were becoming prominent because people had become "terrified" of world conditions.

During the COVID-19 pandemic in the Republic of Ireland, "cocooning" has been the term used by the Health Service Executive and other official bodies when advising precautionary self-isolation by those aged over 70 or in other high-risk groups. In the UK, the term "shielding" is more frequently used. The UK government has advised people who are "clinically extremely vulnerable" to "stay at home as much as possible and keep interactions outside to a minimum. This is called 'shielding'."

== Child rearing and adoption cocooning ==
A 2014 clinical book for mental health practitioners, lawyers and educators describes the parental strategy of cocooning (or "restrictive mediation") as explicitly limiting objectionable material, including from television and the movies, from younger children. When the same practice is used with older adolescents, it was determined parents were less connected to their children, more likely to be resented and less successful in maintaining control in the long term.

In The Social History of the American Family: An Encyclopedia, its authors contend that adoptive parents have "popularized" cocooning as "a strategic way in which to create a safe and secure home in which to raise a newly adopted child." The psychologist Patti Zordich trademarked "cocooning" as the focus of the resources she provides to adoptive families.

Standard cocooning tactics for adoptive parents include retreating from the outside world to focus on the immediate family in order to build bonds that will secure attachment with the child.

== Digital cocooning ==
A 1994 article in PC Magazine described "virtual cocooning" in terms of virtual reality products for exploring and designing one's own interiors or world.

In South Korea, experts who saw the rise of "digital cocooning" in 2006 said that while some people were experiencing a nomadic outdoor life thanks to wireless devices, others were choosing to stay "nested up at home" with them. People who almost never left home because of the internet were characterized as "digital zombies."

Digital cocooning was the subject of a 2014 panel discussion about "isolating elements of pervasive mobile technology."

A 2014 report by Euromonitor International, a strategic market research firm, contends that "A major consequence of the growth in mobile web use is that the trend towards cocooning – the home-centred lifestyle that characterised the early part of the century – has given way to a movement towards mobile or individual cocooning, whereby consumers are immersed in their own digital worlds anywhere and anytime."

Tele-Cocooning is a term developed by Ichiyo Habuchi in 2005 to describe intimate human computer interaction, specifically in reference to "the communication of one person to the next without having physical interaction with that person".

In 2014, an academic study of Japanese youth supported the "tele-cocooning hypothesis", which contends that mobile "texting is associated with increasingly insular communication because it strengthens core ties at the expense of interactions with lesser-known weak ties." The study says that research from many sources showed that texting among youth usually involves "the intensive exchange of text messages among intimate and homogeneous peers." This decreases social tolerance and trust.

A 2015 follow up study concluded that tele-cocooning behavior could be mitigated with smartphone applications stimulating interaction with weak ties through on-screen reminders.

== Books ==
=== The Popcorn Report ===
In her 1991 book, The Popcorn Report, Popcorn describes cocooning as: "the impulse to go inside when it just gets too tough and scary outside. To pull a shell of safety around yourself, so you're not at the mercy of a mean, unpredictable world - those harassments and assaults that run the gamut from rude waiters and noise pollution to crack-crime, recession and AIDS. Cocooning is about insulation and avoidance, peace and protection, coziness and control-a sort of hyper-nesting."

In the 1991 book, Popcorn argues that since she had defined the trend it had been substantiated by subsequent skyrocketing VCR sales; declining restaurant sales just as take out restaurant sales substantially grew; the emergence of "shelter" magazines; screening calls; and the increase in birth rates.

Popcorn described three sub-trends within cocooning: the armored cocoon, the wandering cocoon, and the socialized cocoon.

==== Armored cocoon ====
Indicators of the "armored cocoon" included greater gun ownership among women, and the growth in "paranoia" industries. These include home security systems, computerized watchdog systems linked to private guards and emergency help, anti-snooping devices, home warehousing of supplies and home delivery of food and other supplies to "stock the cocoon."

==== Wandering cocoon ====
The "wandering cocoon" is characterized by controlling one's environment when outside the home, such as car and mini-van design intended to make automobiles more pleasurable and livable. Signs of the "mobile cocoon" included people eating more meals in their cars; conducting business and "life maintenance chores" over the phone while driving; and the increase in airline security.

==== Socialized cocoon ====
The "socialized cocoon" is characterized by surrounding oneself with "soothing, congenial" friends in one's "home cocoon." Rather than entertaining at home as in the past, the socialized cocoon is characterized by selective invitations to a few close friends. Signs included a surge in book clubs, watching television with friends. The 1991 trend was described as "nascent."

=== Other books ===
In her 1997 book, Clicking: 17 Trends That Drive Your Business--And Your Life, Popcorn asserted that the cocooning trend would give rise to 24-hour, comprehensive home banking.

William A. Sherden, in his 1999 book The Fortune Sellers: The Big Business of Buying and Selling Predictions, takes a skeptical view of Popcorn's ideas about cocooning and concludes she was wrong on several issues. Sherden's statistics show double digit percentage growth in activities outside the home in the five years following her prediction.

In 2003, in the Encyclopedia of Community: From the Village to the Virtual World, authors David Levinson and Karen Christensen note that cocooning has intensified with the growth of the internet because people can stay at home for weeks at a time without losing touch with friends, getting food to eat, working or watching recent movies. The authors cite the growth of home entertainment as a significant factor in cocooning, with people treating large casts of fictional characters as a "surrogate community." While they saw no evidence of people entertaining at home more, in the wake of September 11, they said that people traveled less, stayed closer to home and spent more time with their families.

A German economics book in 2009 titled Cocooning: My Home is My Castle asserted that in times of crisis people prefer to "hedgehog" at home and forecast good commercial prospects for chocolate, snacks, ready-made-meals and home furniture.

A self-help book from 2010, The One Year Book of Inspiration for Girlfriends, advocates cocooning as a form of religious retreat.

In 2014, authors Marilyn Coleman and Lawrence Ganong tie cocooning to the trend for larger homes. Rather than using amenities like public pools, parks and movie theaters, and participate in community activities like church and school functions, the authors contended that more people were retreating to large homes designed as a safe and pleasant refuge.

== See also ==
- Agoraphobia
- Hermit
- Hikikomori
- Loner
- Recluse
- Hoarding
