= Kigen Nisen Roppyaku Nen =

Song
- Language: Japanese
- English title: 2600 Years Since the Founding
- Released: December 20, 1939
- Composer: Gihachirō Mori
- Lyricist: Yoshio Masuda

"Kigen Nisen Roppyaku Nen" (紀元二千六百年; 2600 Years Since the Founding) is a Japanese song commemorating 1940. It was written by Yoshio Masuda and composed by Gihachirō Mori.

== History ==
The song was originally written for a competition in 1939, in which it was selected as the winner. Even recently, uyoku dantai groups celebrating National Foundation Day air this song using sound trucks.

== Parody ==
A parody version of this song, concerning the rising cost of tobacco, replaces the original lyrics with the names of cigarette brands.
