= Vanilla Car =

Mobile billboards in Japan

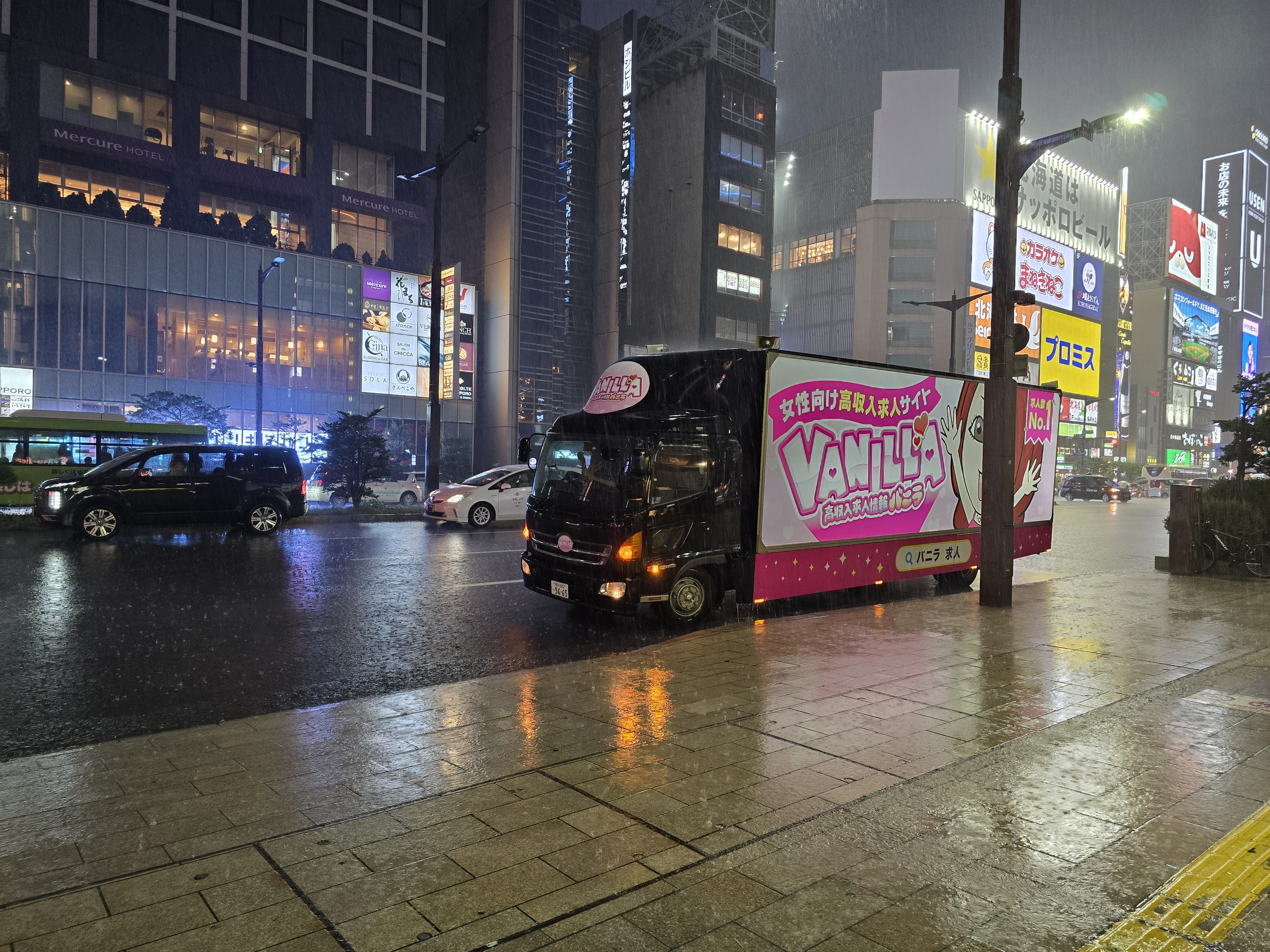
A Vanilla Car in Sapporo

Vanilla Car (Japanese: バニラカー, Hepburn: Banira Kā) is a mobile billboard in Japan operated by Vanilla, a recruitment website for nighttime entertainment, including cabaret clubs and other sex work. First launched in 2008, as of February 2022, there were more than 20 Vanilla Cars running in Japan.

== Design and history ==
After a public relations officer at Vanilla saw a mobile billboard and wanted to do the same with the company, Vanilla Car started operating in 2008.

Vanilla Car is a mobile billboard for Vanilla, a nighttime entertainment job recruitment website. The vehicles are painted with a pink and red-based design of flashy images of women and men, and play a song. They also feature various characters designed by the company, which include: "Vaniko" (バニ子), the main character; "Banimo" (バニ美), Vaniko's partner; "Bani-Otoko" (バニ男), Vaniko's younger brother. According to the company, they chose the pink and red-based design and the characters to make the advertisements "more approachable".

There is also an exclusive design for Kyoto Prefecture due to strict regulations. It was launched in December 2018. The design is a minimalist brown checkered pattern. The song's volume was also slightly lowered. According to the company, the pattern is based on the townhouses of Kyoto. They also said that they chose not to use the "flashy designs" because they "do not want to ruin the unique scenery of Kyoto".

The truck features various designs. The vehicles used includes a 4-ton trucks, 2-ton trucks, light trucks, and buses. The vehicles are running in Tokyo, particularly in Shinjuku and Shibuya. They also run in various downtown areas across Japan. They run through the area, usually on main roads, for about seven hours from the afternoon until night. As of February 2022, there are more than 20 Vanilla Cars running in Japan.

== Song ==
"Vanilla Recruitment Theme Song"

Single by Vanilla Official
- Language: Japanese
- Released: September 24, 2022
- Length: 1:05

"Vanilla Recruitment Theme Song" (バニラ求人テーマソング, Banira Kyūjin Tēmasongu) is song played in Vanilla Cars. It was released on September 24, 2022. According to the composer, it is sung by four or five young women. The theme song posted by the official YouTube channel has received 2.6 million views by February 2022.

It was written by a professional composer after a request was made that "if an ad truck is going to run, it should play music." The lyrics feature a chanting of Bānirabanirabānira kyūjin! Bānirabanira-kō shūnyū! (バーニラバニラバーニラ求人！ バーニラバニラ高収入！, "Vanilla Vanilla Vanilla Recruitment! Vanilla Vanilla High Income!").

== Reception ==
After the Vanilla Car started operating in 2008, it went viral on social media. Images of the vehicles and the theme song become trending on YouTube.

The song used in the vehicles was described by Walkerplus and Tomomi Yonemura of Kai-You as "addicting". Aoshima K.K. commented that "Vanilla's approach to advertising is shocking and very innovative. The billboard features cute characters and catchy music with a perfect song." People from Kyoto praised the design, stating that "it matches the scenery beautifully". Smart Flash Magazine said that "Vanilla Car has become a part of everyday life".

The mobile billboard was featured in the 2019 anime film Weathering with You. According to Kei Onodera of Real Sound, it makes the film "feel haunted by the shadow of the sex industry."

== See also ==
- Sound trucks in Japan
