= Time sink =

Activity that consumes a significant amount of time

A time sink (also timesink), time drain or time-waster is an activity that consumes a significant amount of time, especially one which is seen as a wasteful way of spending it. Although it is unknown when the term was coined, it makes an analogy with heat sink.

== In video games ==
In massively multiplayer online role-playing games (MMORPGs), time sinks are a method of increasing the time needed by players to do certain tasks, hopefully causing them to subscribe for longer periods of time. Players may use the term disparagingly to describe a simplistic and time-consuming aspect of gameplay, possibly designed to keep players playing longer without significant benefit. Time sinks can also be used for other gameplay reasons, such as to help regenerate resources or monsters in the game world.

=== Negative connotations ===
Many players consider time sinks to be an inherently poor design decision, only included so that game companies can increase profits. For example, one Slashdot article describes time sinks as "gameplay traps intended to waste your time and keep you playing longer". In most games, boring and lengthy parts of gameplay are merely an annoyance, but when used in subscription-based MMORPGs, where players are paying recurring fees for access to the game, they become a much more inflammatory issue. Game designers must be prudent in balancing efforts to produce both involving gameplay and the length of content that players expect.

Time sinks are often associated with hardcore games, though whether this is a positive or negative association depends on the context.

=== Trade-offs ===
Implementing time sinks in a video game is a delicate balancing act. Excessive use of time sinks may cause players to stop playing. However, if not enough time sinks are implemented, players may feel the game is too short or too easy, causing them to abandon the game much sooner out of boredom. A number of criteria can be used to evaluate use of time sinks, such as frequency, length, and variety (both of the nature of the time sink and the actions taken to overcome it). What is considered a good balance depends in part on the type of game in question. Casual games are often expected to have less in the way of time sinks, and hardcore games to have more, though this is not a hard and fast rule.

A good timesink has you interacting with the game on some level, earning some level of enjoyment or moving the story along. It might be "realistic", but keep in mind that you are trying to entertain people here and useless timesinks tend to do the opposite of entertain.

— Matt Miller, MMODesigner.com

== General term ==
A time sink is an enjoyable but time-wasting activity.

Some parents call video games a waste of time, while some introverts call parties a waste of time, making the term highly subjective; even sleeping could be considered a time sink. Some time sinks become popular and are therefore not as commonly referred to as a time sink.

More examples of time sinks include watching a sports game, spending time at a bar, spending a day at the beach, day-long spa treatments, camping in the woods, and reading social media.

A time sink generally has a negative connotation but it can be a more neutral term. MMORPGs are known for time-wasting activity. However, the genre of incremental games use waiting as a core feature. Players of such games can take pleasure in repetitive and easy tasks.

== See also ==
- Attention theft
- Busy work
- Digital zombie
- Distraction
- Grinding (video gaming)
- Opportunity cost
- Procrastination
