= Faith Popcorn =

Author and marketing consultant

- Born: Faith Plotkin; May 11, 1943 (age 83); New York City
- Education: New York University (BA)
- Occupation: Futurist
- Employer: Faith Popcorn's BrainReserve
- Known for: The Popcorn Report, Clicking, EVEolution,The Dictionary of the Future
- Children: 2
- Website: faithpopcorn.com

Faith Popcorn (born Faith Plotkin, May 11, 1943) is a futurist, author, and founder and CEO of the marketing consulting firm BrainReserve. She has written three best selling books:The Popcorn Report (1991), Clicking (1996), and EVEolution (2000).

== Biography ==
Born as Faith Plotkin, she later legally changed her name to "Faith Popcorn." She was born in New York City, where both of her parents were lawyers and spent her early childhood in Shanghai before returning to the United States. She attended the High School of Performing Arts in New York City, followed by New York University. Accepted into NYU Law School, she decided instead to go into advertising in the early 1970s, which she said she considered to be more glamorous.

After working in advertising for eight years, she founded the marketing consulting firm BrainReserve in 1974. It works with companies to identify future trends that will affect their business. Popcorn is reported to have advised Coca-Cola, in 1981, to go into bottled water and to have told Kodak in the late 1980s to go into digital instead of print. Another example is Tylenol, Popcorn advised Tylenol to "make pain cool" to make it more relevant to younger generations.

She coined terms like "cocooning" ("the impulse to stay inside when the outside gets too tough and scary", such as turning a home into a nest) and "Cashing Out" ("the impulse to change one's life to a slower and more rewarding pace", sometimes manifested by people who quit corporate jobs). Her company created a "TalentBank" of 10,000 experts who provide forecasts about trends across many topics. It also analyzes newspapers, magazine and other sources, and conducts thousands of consumer interviews to spot future trends.

== Predictions ==
In a series of nine 2006 predictions of major trends, she forecast a cultural trend toward more physical contact, including "mechanized hugging booths." She also said that "second hand nostalgia" would become a trend and that advances in genetics might allow people to custom design pets with bits of their own DNA so their dogs and cats resembled them. Other examples from this series of predictions included "mood tuning" products, such as clothing infused with "neuro-chemicals" to enhance confidence or mental acuity, and demand for exercising "brain fitness", possibly manifesting itself in "brain trainers" to exercise recall or "retort coaches" to help people sharpen their wit.

A 2008 Los Angeles Times entertainment section article, following Popcorn's predictions over a period of five years, credited her with identifying trends such as "food coaches" and "transcouture". In 2014, she predicted to The Hollywood Reporter that films would become immersive events, taking place all around the viewer, who could choose their own avatar as characters. She also predicted fan films, similar to fan fiction. In 2015, she renewed her 1991 prediction that "humanoid robots" would become companions and workers. At an IBM-sponsored conference, she predicted robots would replace one third of jobs in the developed world and that governments would initiate a "disemployment tax" as an incentive to keep people employed. She forecasted virtual reality vacations and said that the average adult would work for several companies simultaneously.

Business book author William A. Sherden takes a skeptical view of her ideas about cocooning. He provides statistics showing double-digit percentage growth in activities outside the home in the five years following her prediction. The U.S. Postal Service paid $566,000 to Popcorn to envision a viable future for the post office, an engagement that was criticized by Republican Senator Tom Coburn of Oklahoma in a list of 100 examples of "wasteful" spending.

== Bibliography ==
- The Popcorn Report: Faith Popcorn on the Future of Your Company, Your World, Your Life. New York: Doubleday, 1991. ISBN 978-0-385-40000-8
- with Lys Marigold. Clicking: 16 Trends to Future Fit Your Life, Your Work, and Your Business. New York: HarperCollins, 1996. ISBN 978-0-88730-694-5
- EVEolution: The Eight Truths of Marketing to Women (co-authored with Lys Marigold),
- with Adam Hanft. The Dictionary of the Future: The Words, Terms and Trends That Define the Way We'll Live, Work and Talk, New York: Hyperion, 2001. ISBN 978-0-7868-7007-3

== Personal life ==
Popcorn lives in Manhattan and Wainscott, Long Island. She is single and has two adopted children.
