= Smartphones and pedestrian safety =

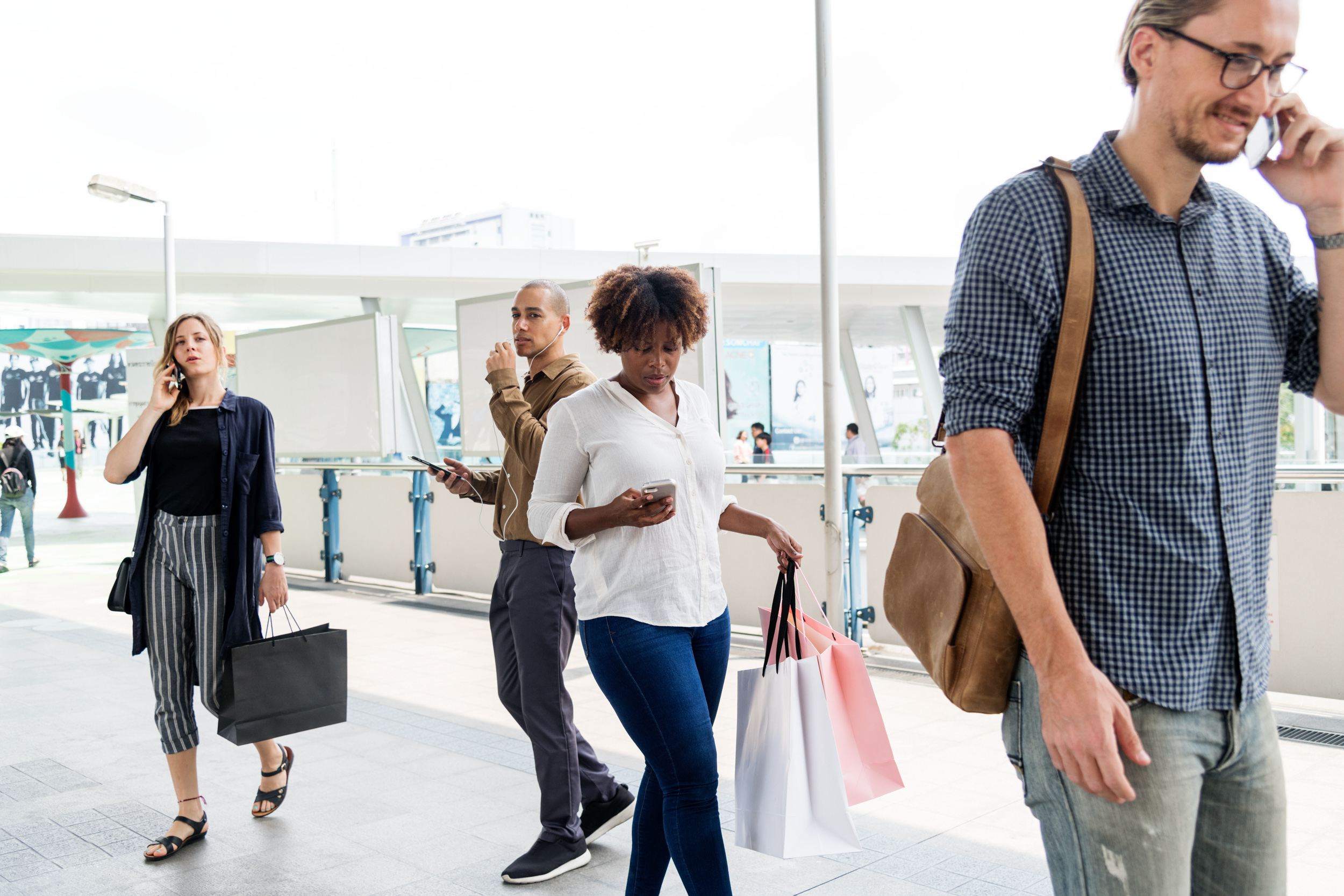
People using phones while walking

Safety hazards have been noted due to pedestrians walking slowly and without attention to their surroundings because they are focused upon their smartphones. Texting pedestrians may trip over curbs, walk out in front of cars and bump into other walkers. The field of vision of a smartphone user is estimated to be just 5% of a normal pedestrian's.

Some cities have taken design measures to make the streets safer for inattentive pedestrians, including lights embedded in pavements, and dedicated lanes for smartphone-using pedestrians.

The pejorative term smartphone zombie has been used to describe inattentive phone users; this phrase was sometimes blended to Smombie in German and has seen some English usage. In Hong Kong such phone users are called dai tau juk ("the head-down tribe"). A 2017 review considered the popular culture term in regards to the medical diagnoses of internet addiction disorder and other forms of digital media overuse.

== Pedestrian phone use ==
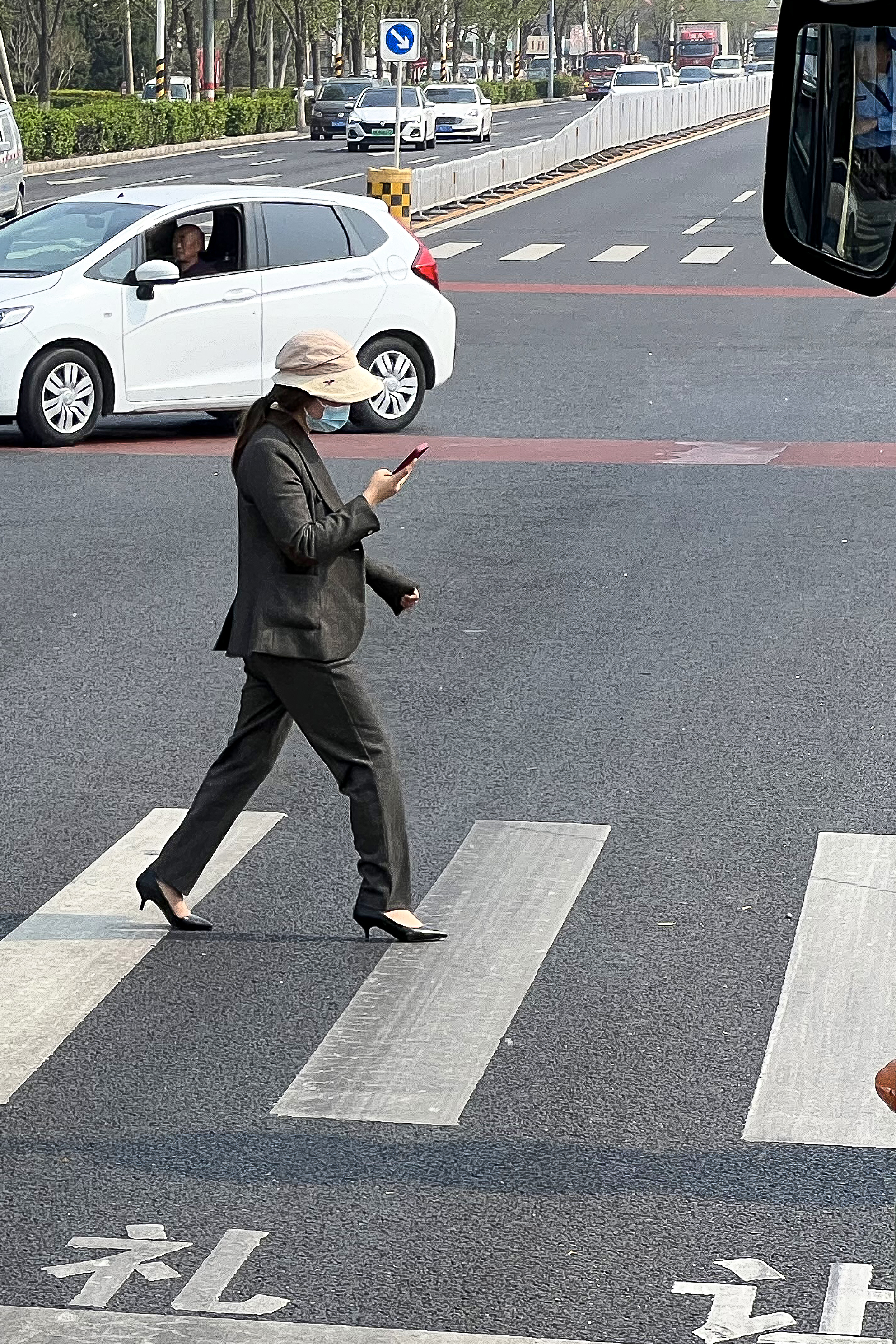
A pedestrian crossing the road while looking down at a smartphone

A 2012 study at twenty intersections in Seattle, USA, found 14% of pedestrians were talking or texting on a phone. A 2018 study of more than two thousand pedestrian observations at four intersections, one in New York City and three in Flagstaff, Arizona, USA, found 9% of pedestrians were talking or texting on a phone while crossing; in contrast to the previous study, this study did not find that phone usage altered walking speed.

In 2016 the American Academy of Orthopaedic Surgeons created a "Digital Deadwalkers" awareness campaign, in response to the risks associated with walking across intersections and sidewalks while paying attention only to smartphones and not one's surroundings. They characterised such pedestrians as "oblivious to everyone else, so it's like they're dead-walking, sleepwalking".

== Car driver phone use ==
A woman texting while driving before leaving the road and crashing into a mailbox in Washington state.

Distracted driving is the act of driving while engaging in other activities which distract the driver's attention away from the road. Distractions are shown to compromise the safety of the driver, passengers, pedestrians, and people in other vehicles.

Cellular device use while behind the wheel is one of the most common forms of distracted driving. According to the United States Department of Transportation, "texting while driving creates a crash risk 23 times higher than driving while not distracted." Studies and polls regularly find that over 30% of United States drivers had recently texted and driven. Distracted driving is particularly common among, but not exclusive to, younger drivers.

== Urban design ==
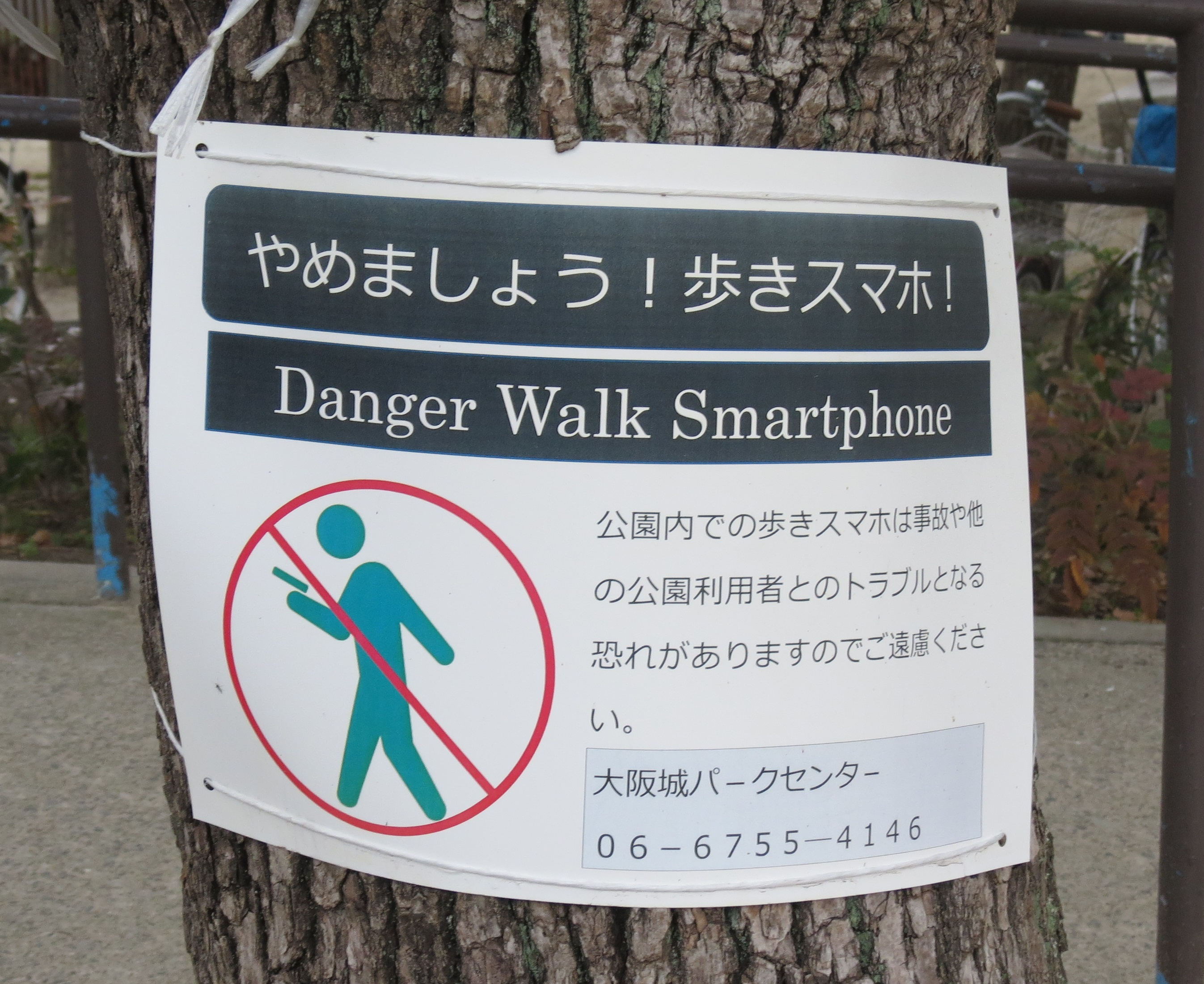
A warning sign in Osaka

In Chongqing, China, the government constructed a dedicated smartphone-sidewalk in 2014, separating the phone users and the non-phone users. A similar scheme was introduced in Antwerp the following year.

In Augsburg, Bodegraven and Cologne, ground-level traffic lights embedded in the pavement have been introduced so that they are more visible to preoccupied pedestrians, while traffic signals at an intersection in Zagreb cast the red light downwards, producing glare on smartphone screens.

In Seoul, warning signs have been placed on the pavement at dangerous intersections following over a thousand road accidents caused by smartphones in South Korea in 2014. The city has also implemented traffic lights embedded into the ground to pass the indication to the pedestrian even if they are fully immersed in their smartphone experience.

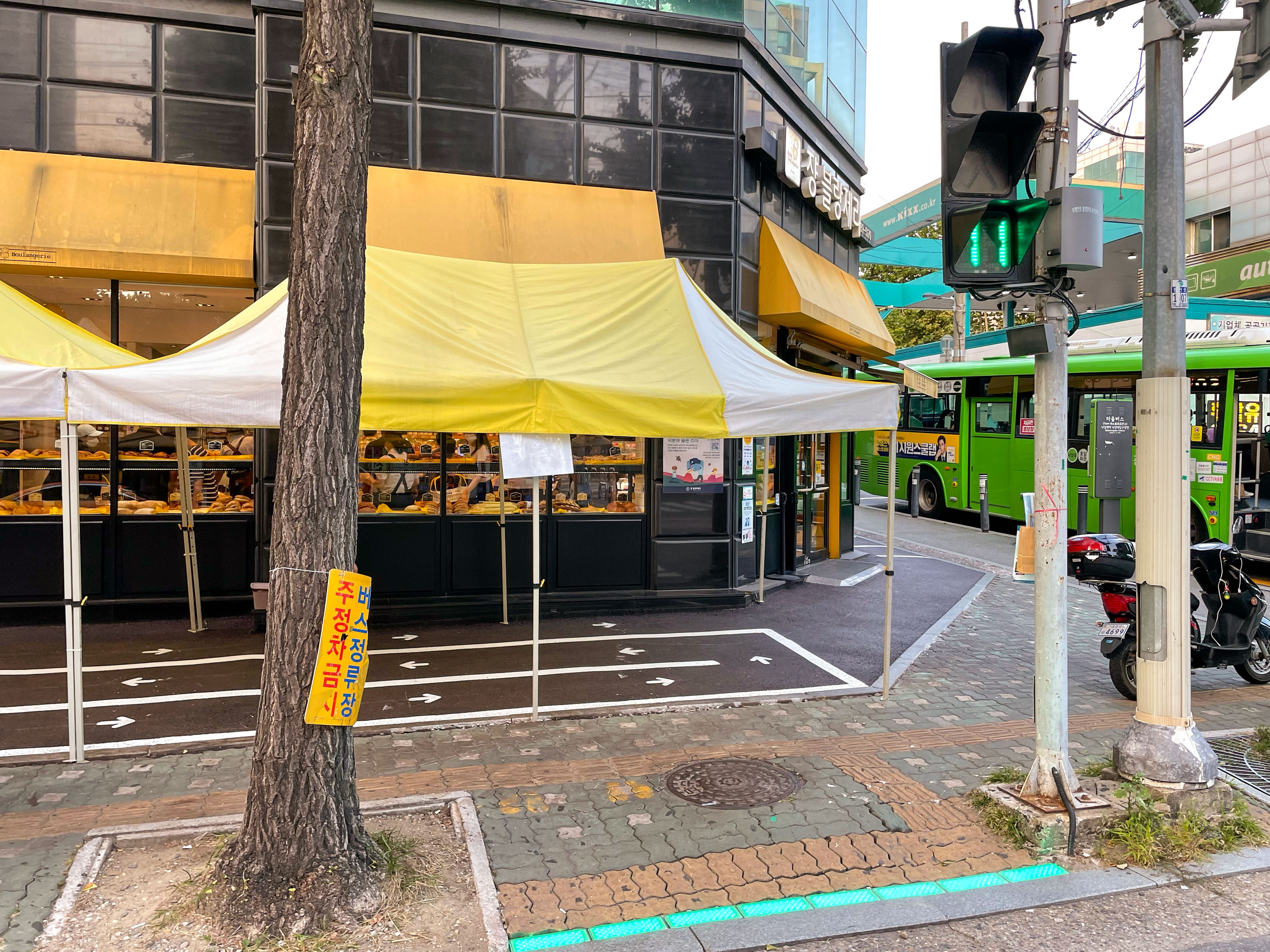
Seoul pavement light in green

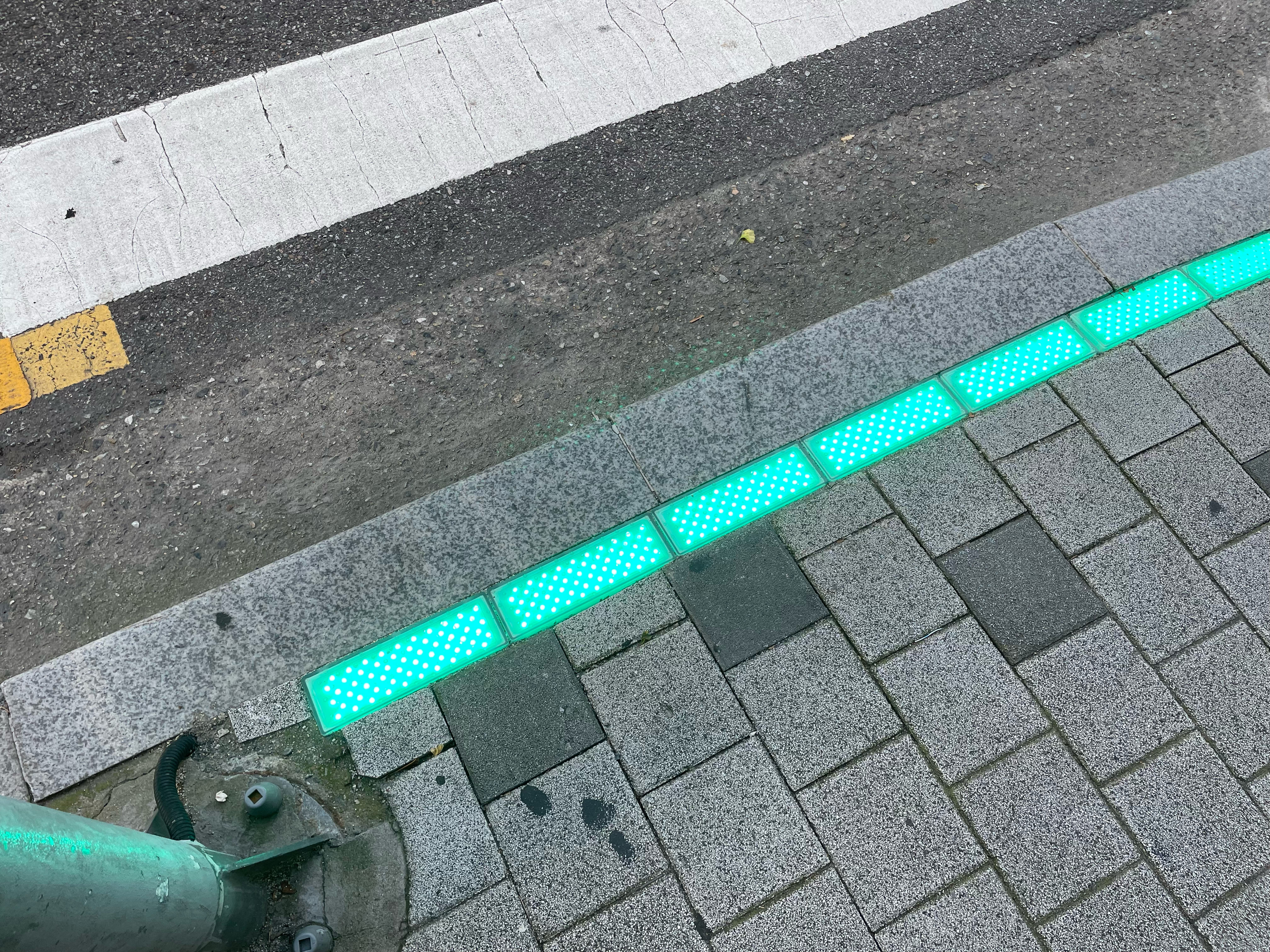
Seoul pavement light in green, close up

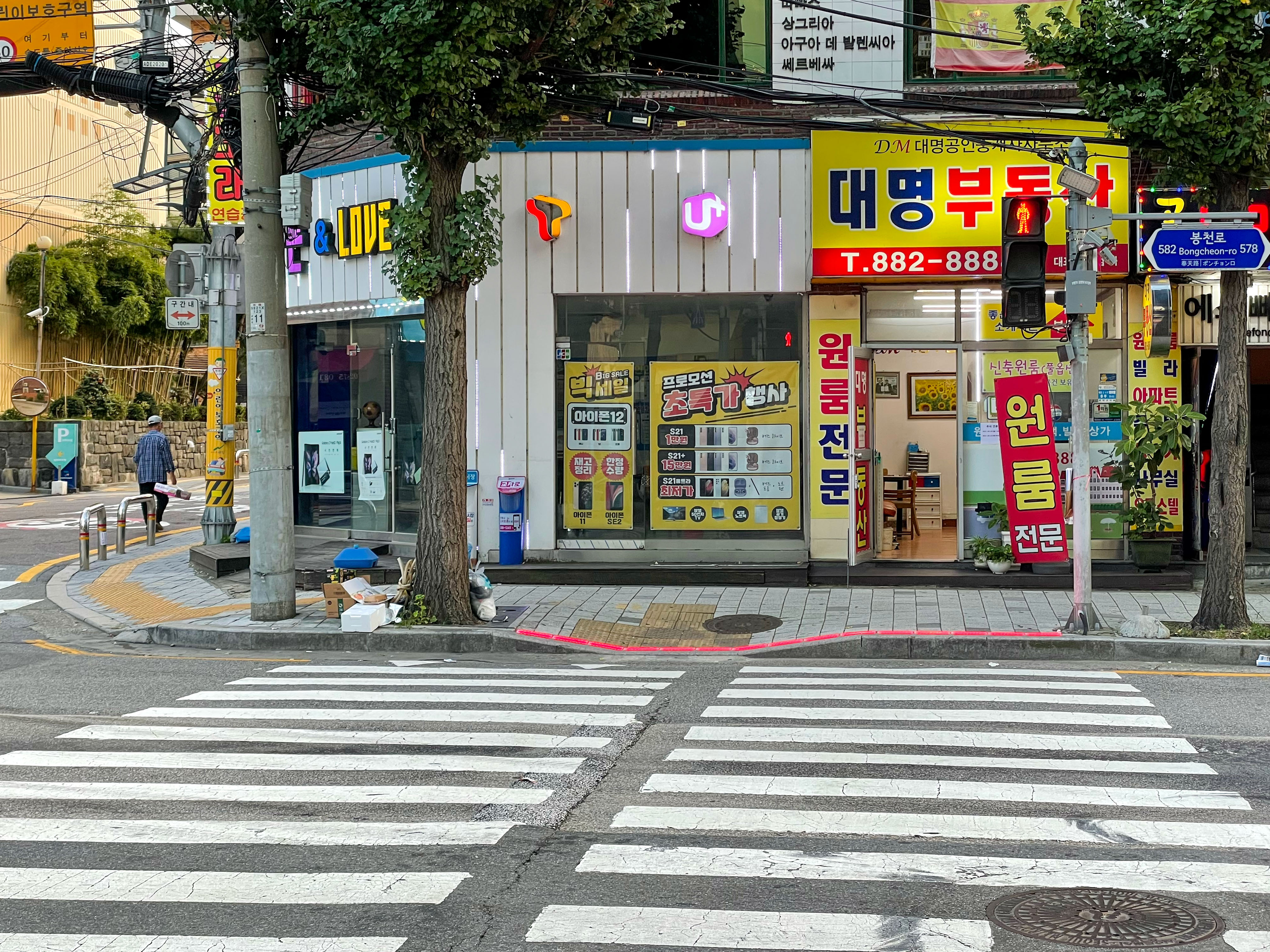
Seoul pavement light in red

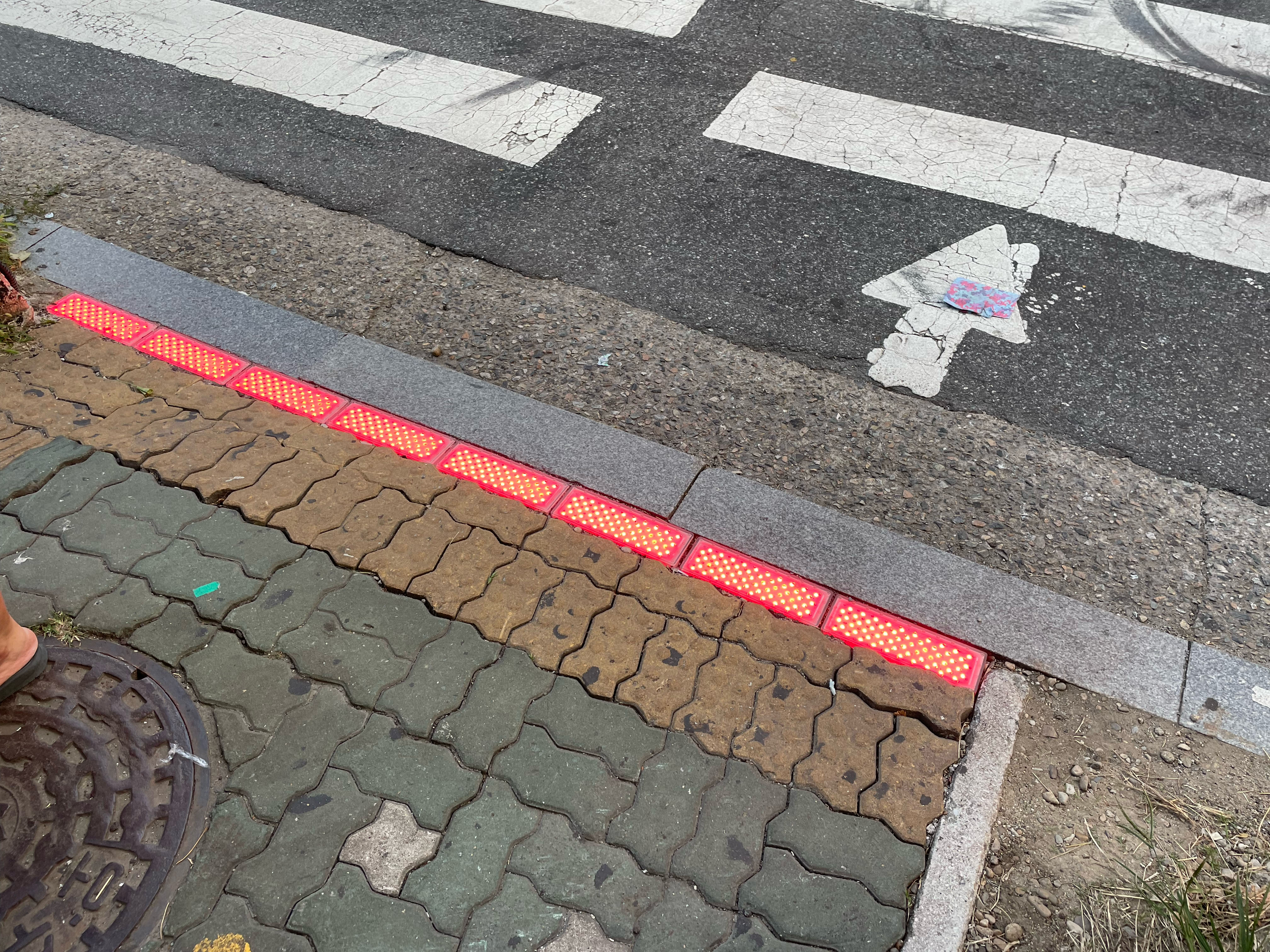
Seoul pavement light in red, close up

== Phone technology ==
An app which uses the phone's camera to make the screen appear transparent can be used to provide some warning of hazards.

== Legal measures ==
In October 2017, the City of Honolulu, Hawaii introduced a measure to fine pedestrians looking at smartphones while crossing the road. In 2019, China introduced penalties for "activities affecting other vehicles or pedestrians" and a woman was fined 10 yuan in Wenzhou.

== In fiction ==
Science fiction author Ray Bradbury wrote about people being distracted by miniaturised technology in the 1950s, in his stories such as The Pedestrian and Fahrenheit 451. He wrote in 1958 of observing a couple walking in Beverly Hills, the woman listening to a small transistor radio "oblivious to man and dog, listening to far winds and whispers and soap-opera cries, sleepwalking, helped up and down curbs by a husband who might just as well not have been there".

== See also ==
- Digital zombie
- Jaywalking
- Mobile phones and driving safety
- Problematic smartphone use
- Phubbing
- Pokémon Go, a mobile game designed to be played outdoors
