= Sound truck =

Vehicle with loudspeakers used to broadcast messages

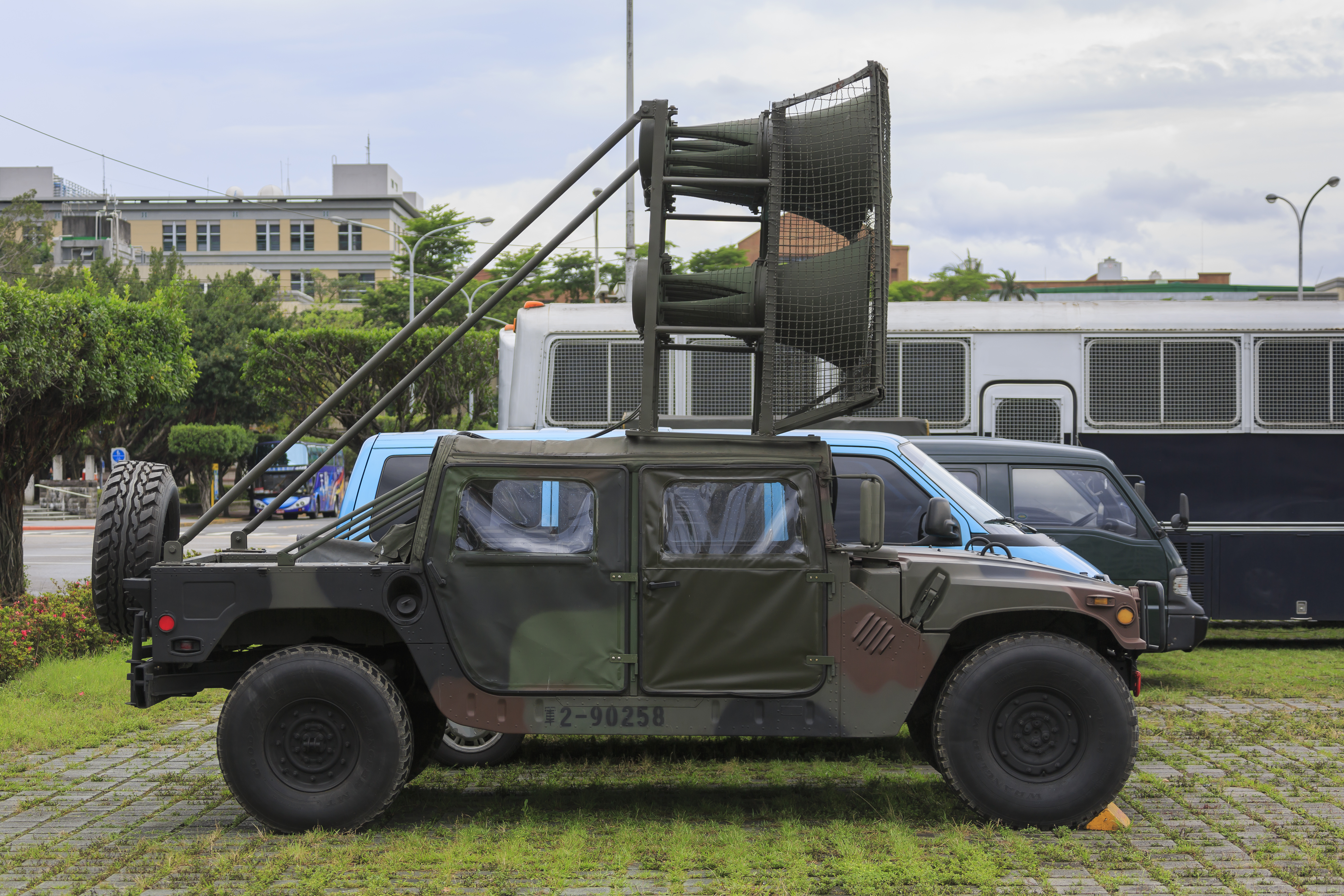
A sound truck owned by the Republic of China Army

A sound truck in Buenos Aires

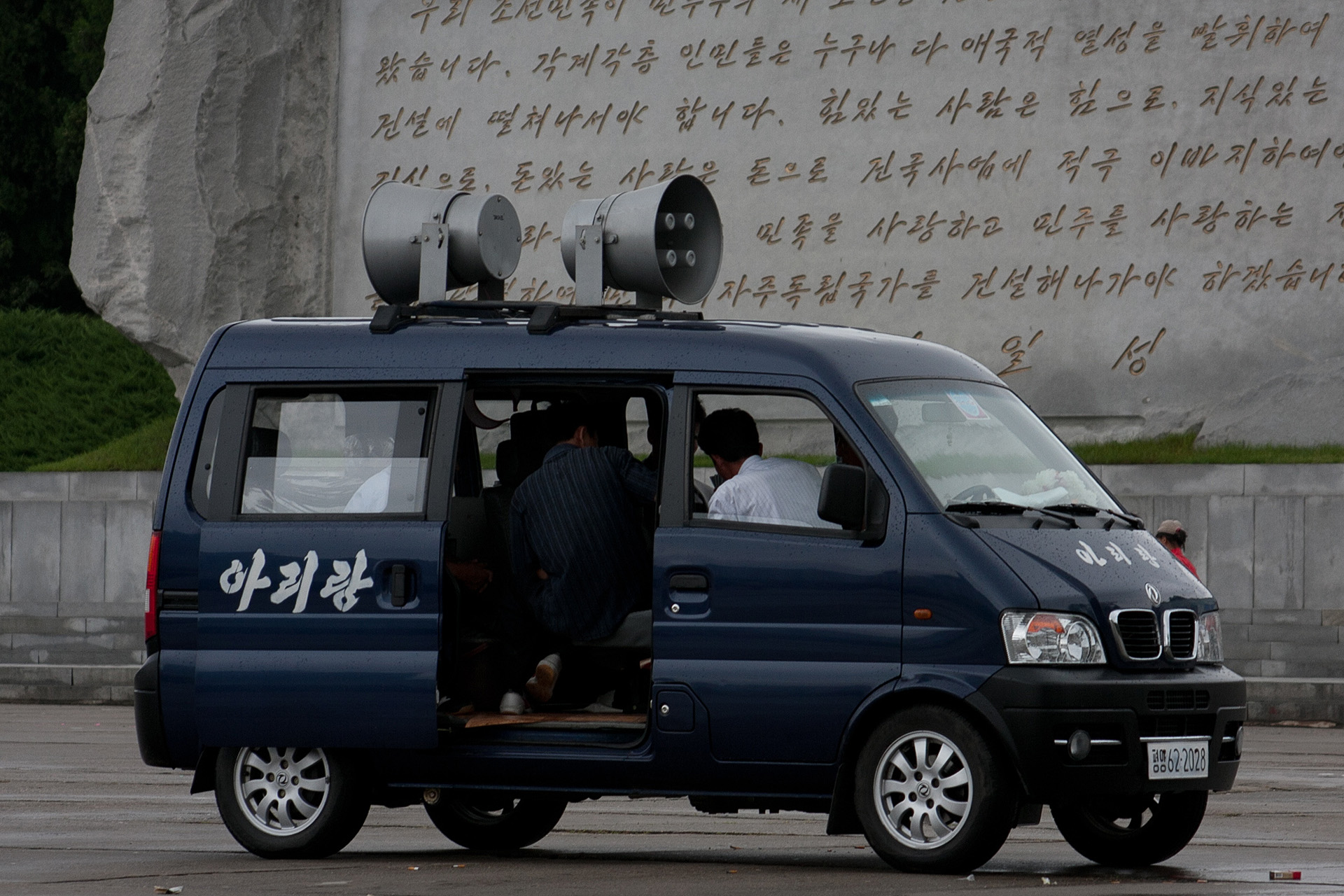
A sound truck in North Korea

A sound truck is a vehicle equipped with a public address system and loudspeakers, typically used to play recorded messages at high volume to the public while driving through residential areas. They are used in many countries by groups to disseminate political messages, such as by candidates during election campaigns, and in some countries for commercial advertising and promotion. They are also used by public safety authorities during emergencies, such as evacuations, to get information quickly to local populations.

The use of sound trucks for advertising is illegal in many jurisdictions, and has been criticized as an example of attention theft. It is legal in Portugal and usually used during election campaigns by political parties. It is also legal in Japan. For the legal situation in the United States see Saia v. New York (1948) and Kovacs v. Cooper (1949). In Bagé, Rio Grande do Sul, Brazil, the level of the sound cannot exceed 65 decibels.

== See also ==
- Sound trucks in Japan
