= Georg Franck =

Georg Franck-Oberaspach is an architect/urban planner, computer programmer, economist, and philosopher. Born in 1946 (Schwäbisch Hall, Germany), Georg Franck studied philosophy, economics and architecture. Holding a doctorate in economics, he became a practising architect and town-planner in 1974. In addition, he was active in software development and produced a planning information system, which has been marketed since 1991. Since 1994 he has held the chair of computer-aided planning and architecture at the Vienna University of Technology. Since 1994, he has been working as a professor of digital methods in architecture and regional planning at the same university (TU WIEN) where until 2015 he was the head of Institute of Architectural Sciences as well as the head of the department of Digital Architecture and Planning. Besides these main responsibilities, he has been engaged in writing widely on philosophy, economics and architecture.

Among his books are:

- Ökonomie der Aufmerksamkeit (The Economy of Attention).
- Munich: Hanser, 1998, Mentaler Kapitalismus (Mental Capitalism)
- Munich: Hanser, 2005 and Architektonische Qualität (Architectural Quality), Munich: Hanser 2008.
