= Grinding (video games) =

Performing repetitive tasks for gameplay or cosmetic advantage

Grinding is a term within video game culture that describes time spent in the game in which a player repeats a general task in order to gain rewards like in-game currency, in-game experience, player stats or other reward types. The method was first seen in dnd, and though there are many adaptations of it, it has since become an entire category of gameplay.

The term "grinding" itself comes from the general human culture of working hard, or "putting the axe to the grindstone." A related term in gaming is "farming," which is a similar act of repeated action with intention to get a reward.

== Motivation ==
A player is commonly motivated to grind due to a desire to earn rewards, gather resources, or increase their level. Alternatively, some people may enjoy repetitive tasks for the purpose of relaxation, especially if the task has a consistently positive result. MMORPGs often require grinding, which is achieved through a progression system. These systems vary from game to game but tend to involve some form of point allocation.

== Approaches ==
=== Regular grinding ===
For some games, grinding is an integral part of the gameplay and is required if the player wants to make significant progress. In some cases, progression may be entirely negated if the player does not grind enough, for example an area necessary for the story may be locked until a certain action is repeated a certain amount of times to prove the experience of the player. Examples of games with grinding include:

RuneScape requires the player to partake in repetitive tasks to level up skills. An example would be the "Slayer" skill, which requires players to defeat a certain number of a specific type of creature. The monsters are chosen based on the player's combat level. Players gain experience while fighting the monsters, which increases both their Slayer level and their combat skills. Because the effort is repetitive and time-consuming, it is considered "grinding".

Borderlands 2 requires players to repeatedly kill specific enemies to acquire Legendary items. Legendary drops are not guaranteed to be dropped the first time, therefore the enemy who drops the desired item will likely have to be fought multiple times.

Minecraft allows players to gather materials by exploring in caves, on the surface, and by other means. However, some materials are harder to find than others, such as diamond or netherite. The most common strategy for finding these materials is to obtain the fastest tools possible, that being a diamond or netherite pickaxe, shovel and axe (depending on the material that the player wants to grind for) that has been enchanted with Efficiency V and using this pickaxe in tandem with a Haste beacon. With this combination, most common blocks can be mined immediately, massively decreasing the time it takes to find rare materials.

=== Advanced rewards ===
The Lord of the Rings Online features a "title system" in which players are awarded special titles, and often new abilities, for killing large quantities of specific types of enemies. This can make grinding worthwhile, as the player benefits from the added experience points and can receive a title they can show off to other players. For example, killing a large number of Wargs grants the player the "Warg-Slayer" title. Killing even more Wargs results in more advanced titles, such as "Warg Foe". This system also existed in City of Heroes/City of Villains, where these titles were named "badges".

Final Fantasy XII features a "Chain" effect, which occurs when a player repeatedly kills the same monster; doing so increases the number in the Chain and improves the quality of the items dropped by the killed enemy. With a maximum of 999 chained kills, the Chain can only be broken by killing a different monster or leaving the area.

Warframe features grinding in one of its purest forms, but also in a quite developed fashion. Every Warframe's parts are acquired differently - most drop from boss fights within the game, others can be easily purchased from a Clan's Dojo, while certain parts have a percentage chance of dropping from certain game modes once the player spends enough time in them. Warframe supports "endless" and "non-endless" missions - with "non-endless" having a set objective, such as capturing a VIP target for interrogation, and "Endless" being infinitely replayable, such as defending an important piece of equipment or intercepting and decrypting enemy communications. Endless missions use a Rotation system, with three different "Drop Tables", one for each. The rule of thumb for Endless missions is AABC, meaning that on rounds 1 and 2, the item that is granted to the player will be selected from Drop Table A, for round 3 it will be chosen from Drop Table B, and round 4, Drop Table C. The cycle repeats every four rounds until the player leaves the mission. "Non-endless" missions may function in two ways: First, missions such as capturing an enemy will have a single drop table and semi-randomly draw an item from it each time, with a certain chance for each item. Missions with more objectives, such as infiltrating three "Data Vaults", will have multiple drop tables, one for each objective. Completing more objectives in "non-endless" missions will allow the player to have a chance at the rarest items included in the last drop table.

=== Limited rewards ===
Guild Wars attempts to reduce grinding by using a very low maximum level (20). Equipment with maximum statistics becomes easy to obtain at a maximum level. Players can still improve themselves by acquiring new and different skills so they can create more varied combinations of skills, or they can gather points for titles that improve certain skills usable only in PvE.

The game was designed to be difficult even for players who have reached the maximum level and obtained the best equipment, but without creating huge gaps between the hardcore and casual players so that both could enjoy the same challenges. Play past the level cap usually provides rewards in the form of tokens and specific in-game currencies that contribute to rarer and often visually superior cosmetic items for player avatars compared to the most easily acquired sets. The focus in these late-game areas is therefore usually aimed at effective teamwork and how the players approach a problem as opposed to the degree of statistics acquired by playtime.

=== AFK or inactive grinding ===
Eve Online features a system that does not require continuous play to increase character skill. Characters are plugged into their ship's computer and are trained at a rate based on their attributes. Attributes can be enhanced to decrease training time, but training occurs continuously whether the player is logged in or not. Some of the advanced skills can take as long as a month or more to reach the next level. Players generally have to grind for ISK (money), minerals, and NPC faction standing. However, the in-game alliance CODE. protests grinding, by attacking or 'ganking' anyone suspected of 'illegal' grinding.

Minecraft allows structures called mob grinders which automates the process of killing monsters. This is usually done by gathering them using flowing water and killing them with a large fall at the end of the water flow. When built, a mob grinder removes the need to fight or work for the mob drops as they become generated passively. The game also allows the players to create other AFK (away from keyboard) farms to aid in fishing, growing sugarcane and other crops, or even generating moss blocks. Utilising redstone and 'TNT duping', a player is able to create a "world eater", a machine that is capable of duplicating TNT in such a manner that a large space of land can be cleared out without player intervention.

Black Desert Online contains the literal definition of grinding in the most simplistic sense, as the methods of making money are through any of the several "life skills" such as cooking, or combat through killing monsters. A cooking session consists of cooking the same dish several hundred or even thousand times for several hours, over and over. This may be performed completely AFK at a lower efficiency and is popular among players who can only attend to their character periodically. It may also be performed more actively, with as little as 8 minutes before the cooking stove, or utensil as it is called in game, is depleted depending on the utensil, gear, and various consumable buffs used.

Grand Theft Auto Online features passive businesses that produce various types of cargo automatically that can be later sold for profit. The player is only required to resupply the businesses and do a sell mission once the production is finished. An exception is the "Nightclub" business that can produce goods without the need to resupply. While the game has a mechanic that kick out of the game players who stay AFK for more than 15 minutes, various methods bypass this. Later game additions add police raids after long AFK sessions.

=== Shorter time commitments ===
World of Warcraft features dungeons that can be played in segments, so that players can play the game in smaller chunks of time, allowing ones who cannot afford to dedicate several hours of continuous playing time to complete them. The game also includes a "resting system" which increases the rate of experience gain for casual players, based on the amount of time spent out of the game. Similar systems exist in other games, including Lord of the Rings Online and City of Heroes.

=== Other ===
MapleStory features a challenge, called the Mu Lung Dojo, that can be done solo. It is available to all players level 105 or above. It is a boss rush, in which the player revisits many bosses, one by one, all in a row. Beating each boss gets the player Dojo points, which, when accumulated in large numbers, can be used to get various items that are capable of improving their gear.

=== Parody ===
The repetitiveness of grinding has given birth to early iterations of idle games, such as Ayumilove's HackerQuest V1 (2008), which parodies a bot grinding for items and avoiding GMs (Game Masters) in Maple Story, a famous MMORPG from Korea.

== Criticism ==
Grinding is a controversial subject among video game players. Some consider grinding to be a result of poor game design, while others embrace it as an inherent feature in all video games. Another criticism of the leveling concept and level playing field approach is that it often allows the player to avoid difficult strategic or reflexive challenges that one might encounter when fighting powerful opponents. By spending a large amount of time battling easily defeated characters (a practice known as bottom feeding), players can gain levels to have little difficulty vanquishing more difficult enemies. To solve the grinding issue, E. McNeill proposes that "the most effective path to victory should also be the most fun". For example, challenging tasks should always give better rewards than easy tasks. Another alternative to grinding is to remove designer-defined objectives, leaving players free to do whatever they want. This creates a new problem where many players might be confused about what they are supposed to do, or they might lack the motivation to do much of anything in the virtual world.

Players of subscription-based online games often criticize grinds as a heavy-handed attempt to gain profit. The most interesting and challenging gameplay is often only available to characters at the highest levels, who are those strong enough to participate in raids or player versus player combat. Grinding is seen as a reason to increase the amount of time it takes to reach these levels, forcing the player to pay more subscription fees along the way.

The IGDA Online Games Special Interest Group has noted that level treadmills are part of the addictive quality of role-playing games or MMORPGs that cater to those who play more than 25 hours a week.

== See also ==
- Time sink
- Experience points
- Level (video gaming)
- Progression
- Skinner box
