= John C. Beck =

American physician and academic

John C. Beck (January 4, 1924 – September 29, 2016) was an American physician and academic. He was particularly involved in the Royal Victoria Hospital and McGill University; the David Geffen School of Medicine at UCLA; and Ben Gurion University of the Negev.

His books include Primary Care in a Specialized World and Geriatrics in the United States: Manpower Projections and Training Considerations. He's widely cited within his field.

== Biography ==
Born in Audubon, Iowa in 1924, John C. Beck received his BSc (1944), MSc (1947), Diploma in Medicine (1951), and MDCM (1952) degrees at McGill University.

During 1979–1993, he and his colleagues built a program in geriatric medicine. In a 2004 publication titled Brief history of geriatrics in the USA, J.E. Morley refers to it as the West Coast School of Geriatrics and identifies the integration of two Geriatric Research and Education Centers at V.A. Medical Center, Sepulveda, California, and Wadsworth Medical Center in the greater Los Angeles area.

Beck was joined in his endeavor by David Solomon, Robert Kane, and Emmet Keeler. This working group, during that year, produced projections for the workforce needs for the US in anticipation of the country's aging population. The physician data was reported in the New England Journal of Medicine in 1980.

It was during this period that Beck did work with Sidney Katz at Case-Western University.

Beck became emeritus Professor of Medicine in 1993. His research interests during his emeritus status have focused on the prevention of disability in elders. His work has been published in such notable medical journals as JAMA (journal): The Journal of the American Medical Association, The Lancet, and The New England Journal of Medicine

== Honors and awards ==
Beck's awards include the Holmes Gold Medal from McGill University (1947), the Ronald V. Christie Award from the Canadian Association of Professors of Medicine (1987), the Duncan Graham Award from the Royal College of Physicians and Surgeons (1990), the John Phillips Memorial Award from the American College of Physicians-ASIM (2003), and many others. In 1954 he was recognized as an Honorary Fellow by the Royal Society of Medicine in London and as a Markle Scholar in the Medical Sciences by the Markle Foundation of New York. In 1982 he received Special Recognition for contributions to National Board of Medical Examiners, and in 1987 he became a Master of the American College of Physicians. His more recent honors include the Ignatius Nascher Award of the City of Vienna for the paper "Determinants of future hospital admissions and physician visits in community dwelling older persons in Europe" in 2006.
