= Adam Hanft =

American brand strategist

Adam Hanft is an American brand strategist who also writes and speaks on business and cultural trends for a variety of print, television and online media. His blog SpinSeason.com, which analyzes politics in a cultural context, is a partner blog of Salon.com. A Phi Beta Kappa graduate of New York University's College of Arts and Sciences, Hanft serves on the Board of Directors of Scotts Miracle-Gro, the world's largest marketer of branded consumer lawn and garden products. He is also a strategic adviser to Conduit, Israel's largest Internet company, LaunchBox digital, an early stage venture capital firm; to Luminoso, a text analytics firm that was incubated in the MIT Media Lab; and to Keas, a provider of wellness solutions using game mechanics.

Obama for America cited Hanft as an early "tech leader" who endorsed Obama in his 2008 run for office. He went on to be an unpaid digital adviser to the campaign. Hanft also advised the FCC on its "Future of Media" initiative.

== Strategy and brand consulting ==
Hanft founded Hanft Projects in 2010 as a strategic consultancy that develops marketing and communication solutions for consumer brands and business-to-business companies, as well as consulting and venture firms. The firm's clients have included McKinsey, Microsoft, Conduit, Barnes & Noble, Match.com, Citysearch, Vinfolio, Aviary, borro, City Light Capital and Ribbit Capital.

== Advertising career ==
Hanft is a copywriter who started as a comedy writer, working for Garry Marshall. Hanft has worked at Jack Tinker & Partners, and Wells Rich Greene (WRG), where he wrote the "Flick Your Bic" advertising campaign, named one of the 50 best campaigns of all time by Entertainment Weekly.

Hanft left WRG in 1980, and started Slater Hanft Martin, which eventually became Hanft Unlimited, Inc. The New York Times described the firm as "A small advertising agency that is every large agency's nightmare."

Hanft's clients have included Sony, Procter & Gamble, Match.com, and Chemistry.com, for which the firm won an Effie for marketing effectiveness in 2008. He also created and orchestrated the $60MM 'It's Okay to Look' campaign for Match.com.

== Saddam Hussein ==
In 1992, Hanft's agency referenced Saddam Hussein in an advertisement for a client that delivered financial information. The advertisement was headlined "History has shown what happens when one source controls all the information." An Iraqi diplomat protested.

== Journalism and cultural criticism ==
Hanft writes on a variety of political and cultural subjects for media that include The Daily Beast, Salon, Huffington Post, CNN, Wired, The Atlantic and AOL News. He has also been a frequent commentator on public radio's Marketplace, and has appeared regularly on TV including The Daily Show. For five years he wrote the back-page column "Grist" for Inc. magazine, where he served as a Contributing Editor and Marketer-in-Chief.

== Dictionary of the Future ==
Published in 2001 and co-written with Faith Popcorn, Dictionary of the Future is described a collection of words and terms that have not yet entered mainstream dictionaries. Wired called the book a "memetic encyclopedia of what's to come, an engaging crash course in bleeding-edge ideas and debatable issues".

Many of the concepts and predictions published in "Dictionary of the Future" went on to become culturally-relevant phenomena, including: free-range children; ego-surfing; Internet sentiment research; infographic design; locouture (local fashion); crowd-sourced new products combat drones; data fasts, and "online learning experts" as a job of the future.
