= Sound trucks in Japan =

A Liberal Democratic Party sound truck in Shinjuku, during an election campaign in 2016

In Japan, sound trucks (街宣車, gaisensha) are vehicles equipped with a public address system. They have been used notably in political and commercial contexts, and have one or more loudspeakers which can play a recorded message or recorded music as the truck tours through neighborhoods. In the political world, they are used by parties, candidates, and groups to express their views. In the early days of Japanese post-war democracy, they were one of the most common means of conducting political campaigns, alongside the likes of radio announcements and sponsored meetings. In a commercial context, vendors also use sound trucks for the purpose of selling goods, collecting recyclable materials, and other purposes.

The use of these sound trucks can be subject to so-called "nuisance laws".

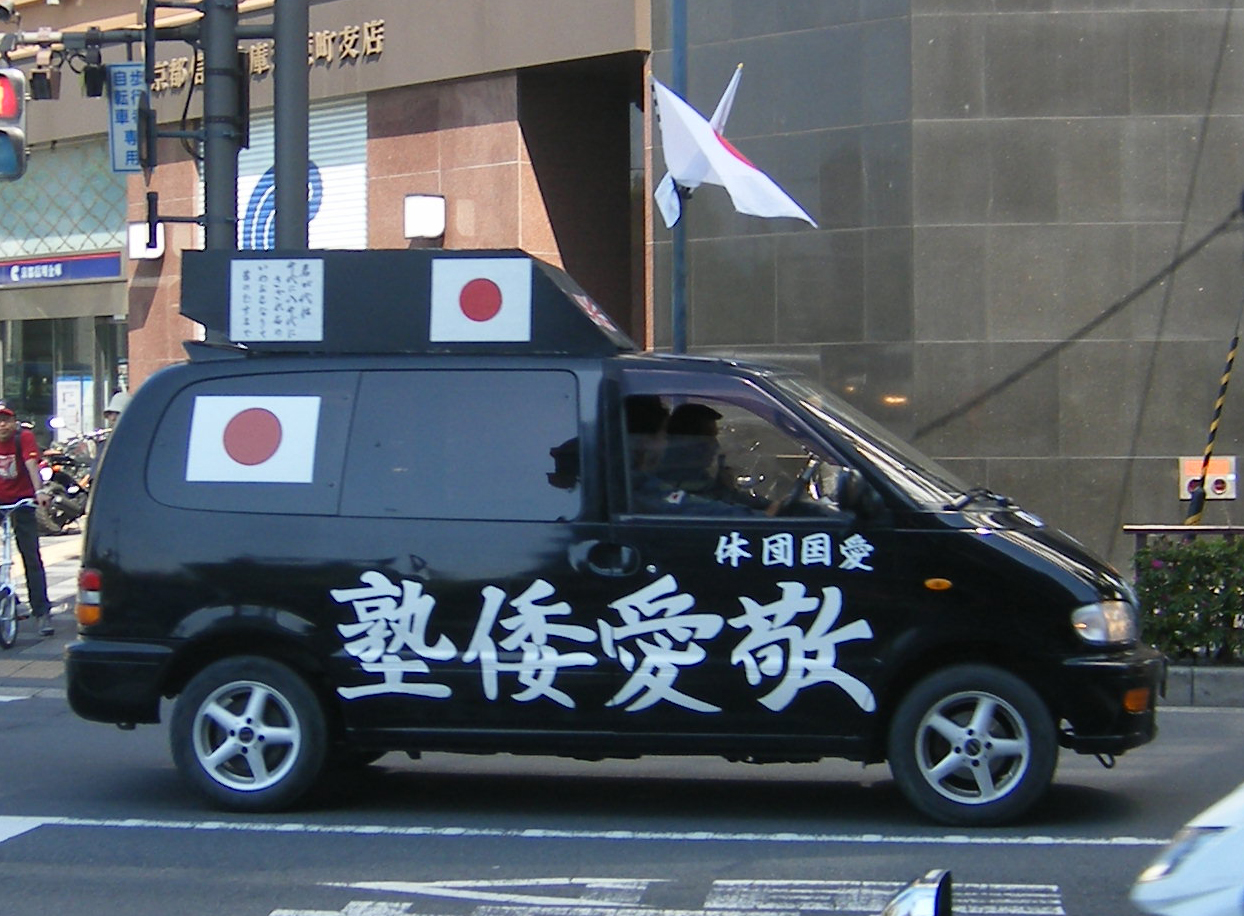
Nationalist sound truck, demonstrating in Kyoto, on Constitution day. The large white characters read from the right (the front of the vehicle) 敬愛倭塾 kei ai yamato juku, literally translated as "respect ancient Japan school".

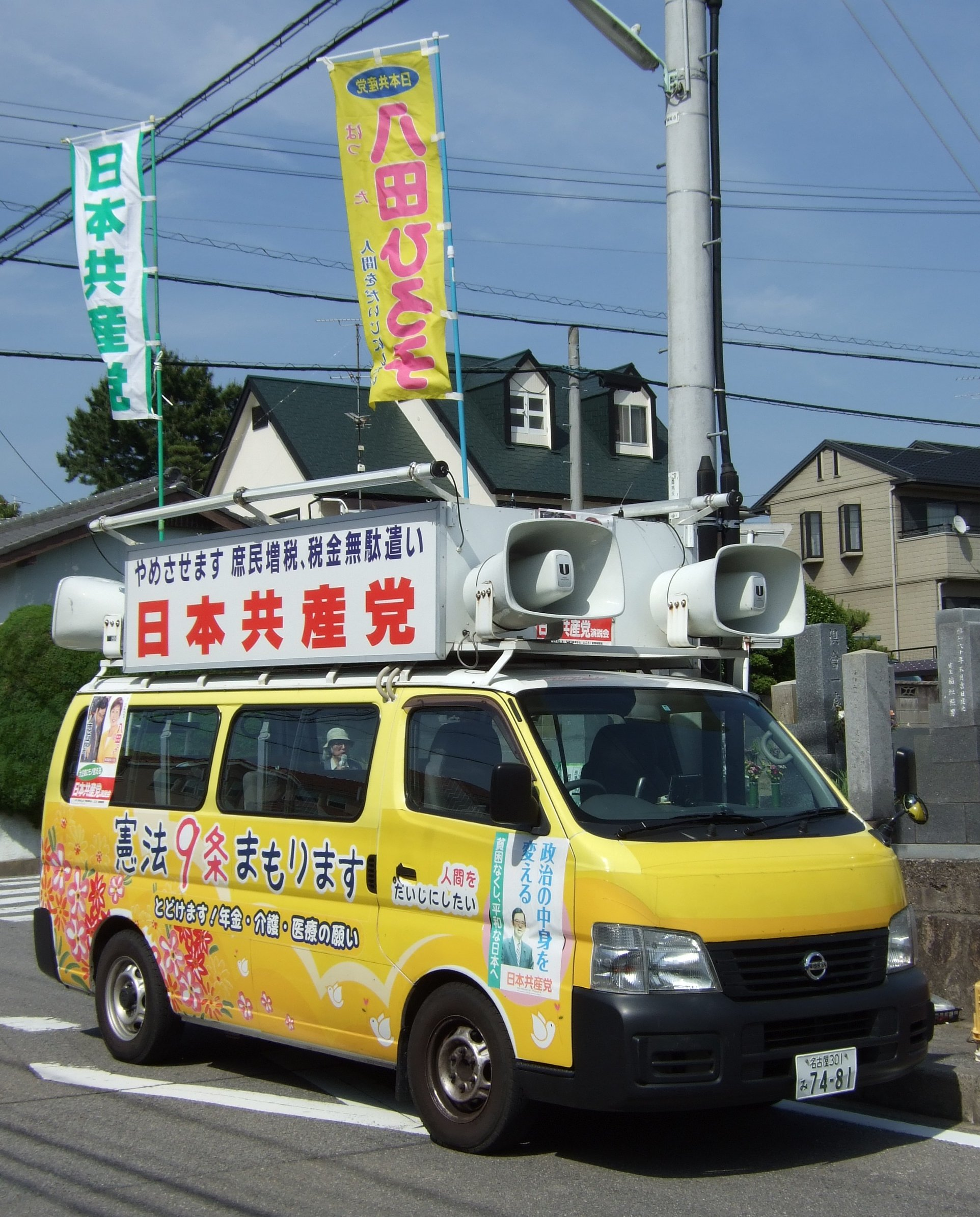
Sound truck, operated by the Japanese Communist Party, seen in Aichi, Japan

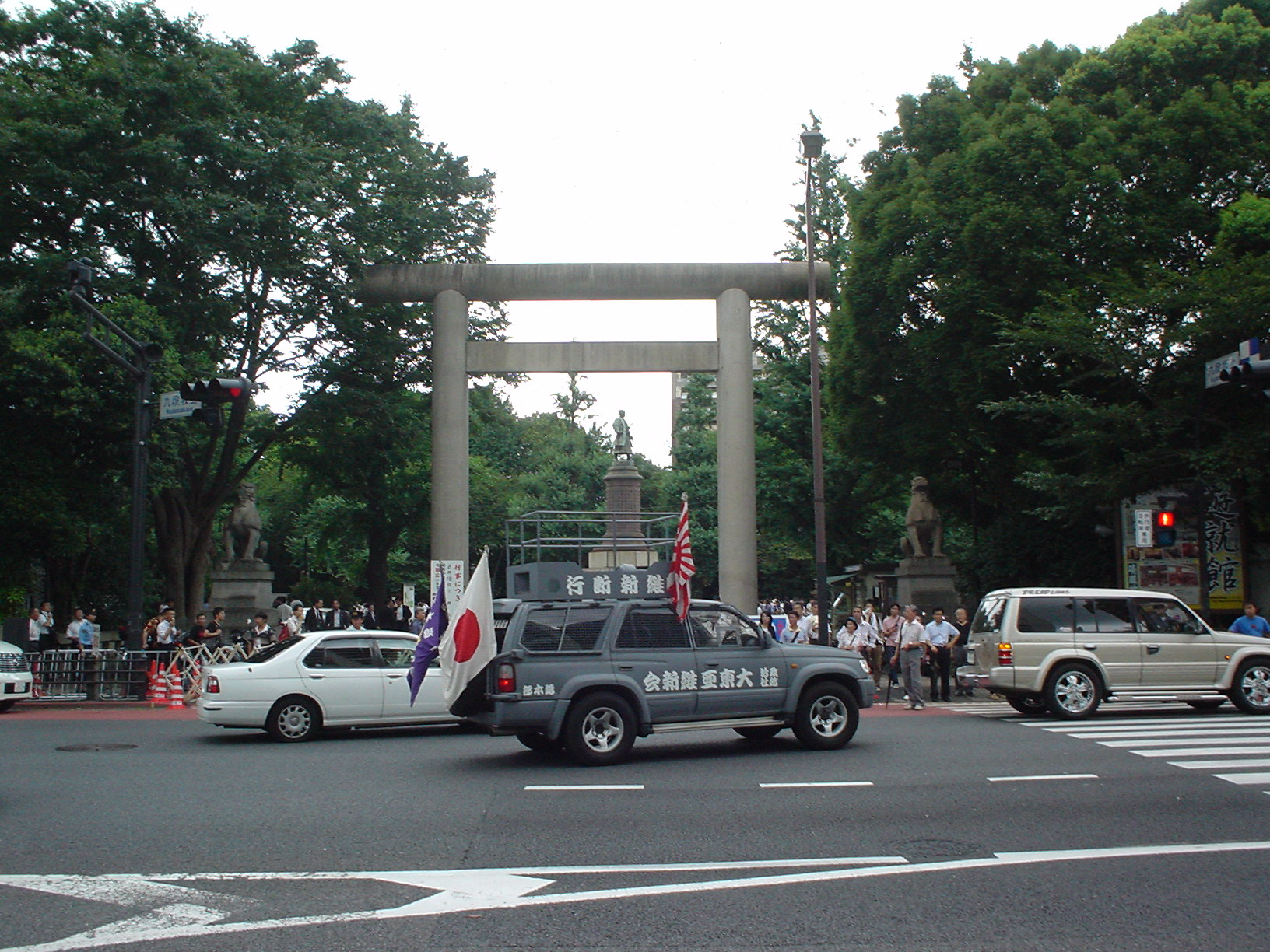
Nationalist sound truck in front of the Yasukuni Shrine on the V-J Day

== See also ==
- Vanilla Car
