= Digital zombie =

Person overengaged with digital technology

A digital zombie is a person so engaged with digital technology or social media they are unable to separate themselves from a persistent online presence. Writing in 2017, University of Sydney researcher Andrew Campbell expressed concerns over whether or not the individual can truly live a full and healthy life while they are preoccupied with the digital world. Other individuals have also begun referencing certain types of behaviour with being a digital zombie. Stefanie Valentic, managing editor of EHS Today, refers to it as people hunting digital creatures through their smartphones in public spaces, always fixed on their phones. The University of Warwick has used the term to argue that further research needs to be done with people who exist in digital form after death to help people grieve their loss.

== Modern applications ==
=== Distracted walking ===
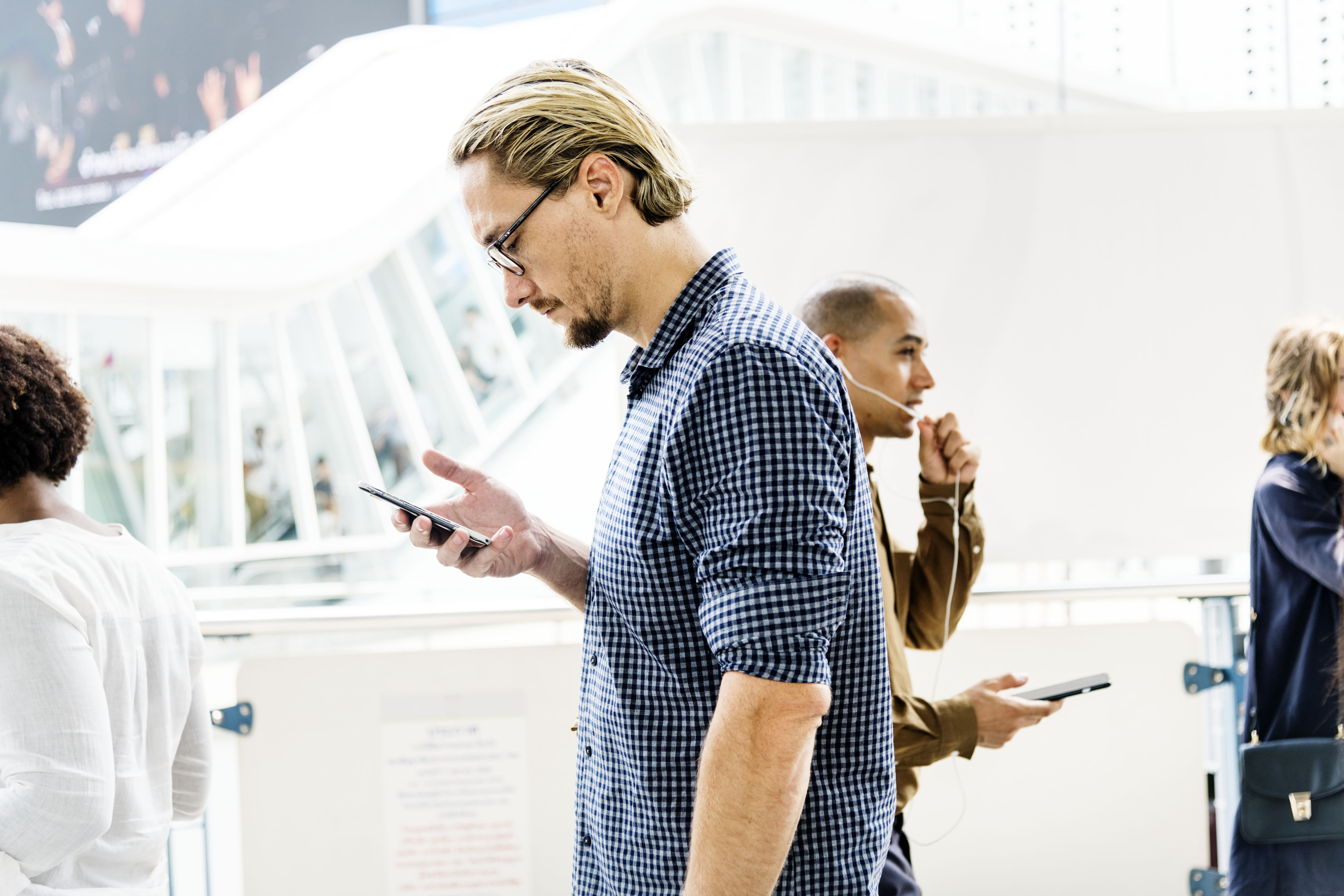
A person walking, distracted with his smartphone

The term digital zombie can refer to a person performing distracted walking, which has been labelled dangerous by the American Academy of Orthopaedic Surgeons. They created the "Digital Deadwalkers" campaign after physicians became aware of the risks associated with walking across intersections and sidewalks while paying attention only to smartphones and not one's surroundings. Also stating that the name is derived from the fact that "they're oblivious to everyone else, so it's like they're dead-walking, sleepwalking."

=== Living through media ===
The Department of Sociology, University of Warwick has also identified the term, digital zombie, to refer to an individual who has died but is digitally resurrected, reanimated and socially active. These digital zombies do things in death they did not do when they were alive as they "live" again through a digital self on a digital medium. Dead celebrities sometimes become digital zombies when they are reanimated to appear in commercial advertisements (such as Audrey Hepburn and Bob Monkhouse). Other accidental digital zombies include Tupac Shakur and Michael Jackson who were both digitally resurrected and recreated to perform "live" on stage years after their death. Researchers at the University of Warwick have carried out research into the area of human-computer interaction. in an effort to understand the affect these digital zombies have on grief and bereavement.

=== Mobile gaming ===
Writer for EHS Today, Stefanie Valentic, has made observations with the mobile phone video game Pokémon Go, which offers players the experience to hunt and collect digital creatures called Pokémon through their smartphone in real world. Players can be observed simultaneously gazing at their phone while also obliviously walking around their environments looking for Pokémon. Stefanie references these individuals as "digital zombies" since they walk around with no cognition of their surroundings while engaged with their phone.

== Health risks ==
=== Heavy use of technology ===
Research by the University of Sydney has begun looking at how new technology such as digital media and smartphones impact our lives and questioning whether they can create new compulsions and obsessions. The research demonstrates that increased heavy technological use can have negative health consequences similar to drugs, smoking, and alcohol. Marcel O'Gorman, an associate professor of English at the University of Waterloo, has commented on the body of research examining how technology impacts cognition, stating currently that there is no empirical evidence to support any theories that suggest that technology can damage memory and attention span.

=== Heightened risk to children ===
Manfred Spitzer, a German psychiatrist, has raised concerns with providing digital devices to children. During the early childhood stage while their brains are rapidly growing, increased exposure to digital devices may deprive them of necessary development required to facilitate brain growth. These concerns are also shared by Korean doctors who believe giving digital devices, like smartphones to children, limits their cognitive development.

== See also ==
- Smartphone zombie
