= Scott Beale (cultural curator) =

American blogger

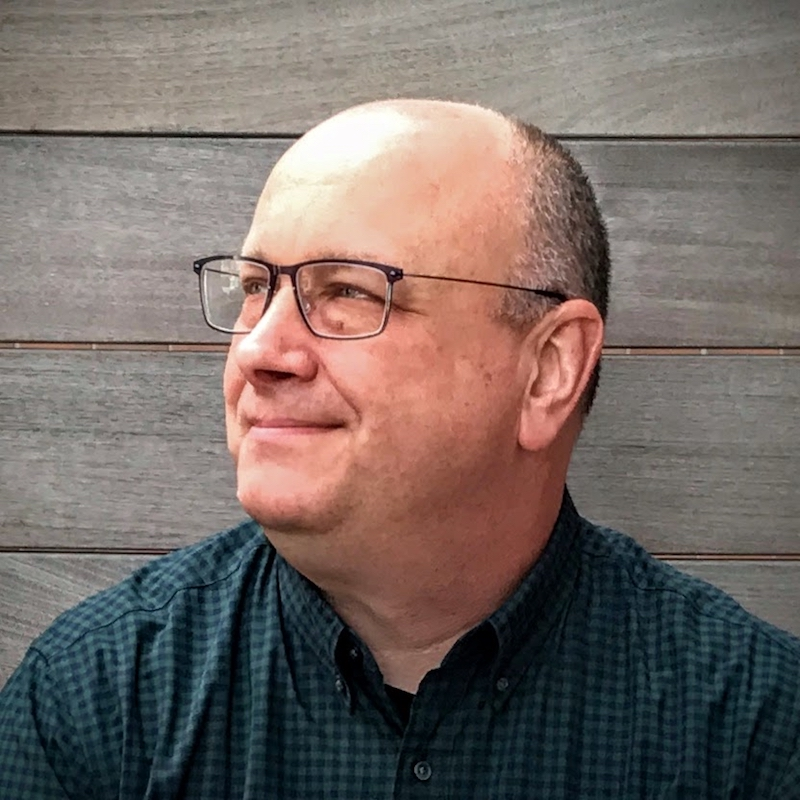
- Beale in 2016
- Born: May 30, 1968 (age 58); Dayton, Ohio, U.S.
- Occupations: cultural curator, photographer, documentarian, social media expert

Scott Beale (born May 30, 1968) is an American cultural curator, photographer, documentarian and social media expert who founded Laughing Squid, a blog about art, culture and technology and a web hosting company. He is New York City based.

== Projects ==
=== Documentary Films ===
Beale produced two documentary films, Alonso G. Smith, A Half Century of Social Surrealism (1995) about San Francisco Bay Area surrealist painter Alonso Smith and You’d Better Watch Out: Portland Santacon ’96 (1997) about the SantaCon event in Portland, OR organized by the San Francisco Cacophony Society in 1996.

=== Laughing Squid ===
In 1995, Beale started Laughing Squid in San Francisco as a film and video company. In 1996 he launched The Squid List, an art and culture list for the San Francisco Bay Area, that was inspired by experiences he had with the Cacophony Society and Burning Man. In 1998 he launched the web hosting company Laughing Squid Web Hosting followed by the launch of the Laughing Squid blog in 2003. In 2013 he became a member of the Executive Academy of judges for The Webby Awards.

=== Photography ===
Beginning in the 1990s, Beale has been actively documenting a variety of underground and countercultural activities and tech events in the Bay Area and all over the world. Examples are images and videos of art groups and events like SantaCon, Survival Research Labs, Cacophony Society, RE/Search, monochrom, XOXO, ROFLcon, FooCamp, Burning Man and Maker Faire.
