= Laughing Squid =

Blog and web hosting company

- Type: Blog, Web hosting service
- Founded: San Francisco, California on November 16, 1995
- Founder: Scott Beale
- Headquarters: New York City, New York
- Website: laughingsquid.com

Laughing Squid is a blog featuring art, culture, and technology, as well as a web hosting company based out of New York City, New York.

== History ==
Laughing Squid was founded on November 16, 1995 in San Francisco, California as a film and video production company by Scott Beale, producing documentaries, including Alonso G. Smith, A Half Century of Social Surrealism about San Francisco Bay Area surrealist painter Alonso Smith and You’d Better Watch Out: Portland Santacon ’96 about the SantaCon event in Portland, OR organized by the San Francisco Cacophony Society in 1996.

In 1996, Laughing Squid launched The Squid List, a San Francisco Bay Area art and culture events calendar and email list that was decommissioned in 2013.

In 1998, Laughing Squid launched a web hosting company Laughing Squid Hosting.

In 2000, Laughing Squid became an LLC with John Law and David Klass joining as partners.

The blog launched in 2003.

Laughing Squid sponsored the back of Frank Chu's sign from 2009 to 2013.

In 2010, the company moved its headquarters to New York City, New York.

== Team ==
The Laughing Squid blog is run by founder Scott Beale, who is Publisher and Editor-In-Chief. He is joined by Contributing Editor Lori Dorn.

== Awards ==
- 2011 Webby Award: Web (Blog - Cultural) - People's Voice
