= Survival Research Laboratories =

Machine performance art group

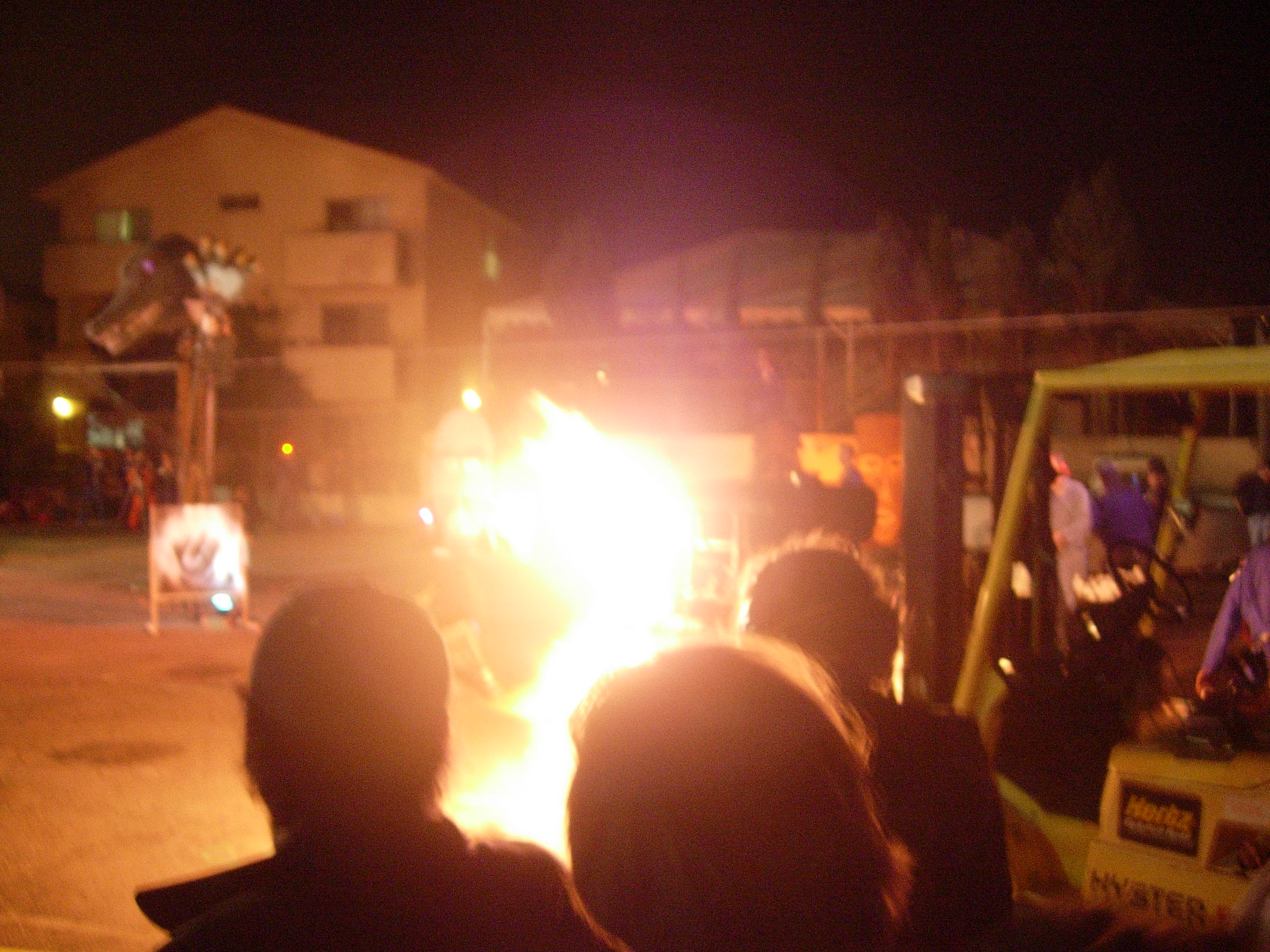
SRL performance in Chinatown, Los Angeles, January 2006

Survival Research Laboratories (SRL) is an American performance art group which pioneered the genre of large-scale machine performance. Founded in 1978 by Mark Pauline in San Francisco the group is known in particular for performances where custom-built machines, often robotic, compete to destroy each other. The performances, described by one critic as "noisy, violent and destructive", are noted for visual and aural cacophony created by the often dangerous interactions of the machinery. SRL's work is related to process art and generative art.

== History ==
SRL was started in San Francisco in 1978 by Mark Pauline. Critics drew parallels between the group's founding and the punk and industrial music scenes of San Francisco at the time. The group's name is a parody of corporate culture. Pauline said that "the vision for SRL was always about creepy, scary, violent and extreme performances that really captured the feeling of machines as living things".

SRL's early collaborators included the machine artists including Matt Heckert and Eric Werner. Heckert's work in the group centered on the acoustic and musical parts of performance. He left the group in 1988 to follow his musical interests. After about 30 years in San Francisco, SRL moved to Petaluma, California in 2008.

== Shows ==
As of late 2023, SRL has conducted over 120 shows throughout the world, mostly in the western United States. SRL shows are essentially performance art installations acted out by machines rather than people. The interactions between the machines have been characterized as "noisy, violent, and destructive". A frequent tag-line on SRL literature is "Producing the most dangerous shows on Earth." A side-effect of the group's activities is frequent interactions with governmental and legal authorities.

Their performances are also given colorfully elaborate names as a comment on bureaucratically generated research projects & papers, such as A Calculated Forecast of Ultimate Doom: Sickening Episodes of Widespread Devastation Accompanied by Sensations of Pleasurable Excitement. The first SRL show was Machine Sex on February 25, 1979. The event featured a device called The Demanufacturing Machine which "demanufactured" objects by shredding them and flinging them toward the audience. The 1982 show A Cruel and Relentless Plot to Pervert the Flesh of beasts to Unholy Uses integrated machines with objects such as mummified and dissected animals and a robot that was part metallic dog, part cadaver.

In August 11, 1985 8pm, at 330 Santa Fe Ave., Los Angeles SRL performed "Extremely Cruel Practices: A series of events designed to instruct those interested in policies that correct or punish". Billed as: LACE (Los Angeles Contemporary Exhibitions) and ANTICLUB present: A Machine Performance by Survival Research Laboratories / Mark Pauline and Matt Heckert, assisted by Eric Werner, Neal Pauline, and Monte Cazazza. Performed at an abandoned train depot lot, situated with the Los Angeles concrete river to the east, the 1st street bridge to the north, the 4th street bridge to the south. Attendees were required to sign a waiver before admission.

The group performed The Misfortunes of Desire (Acted Out at an Imaginary Location Symbolizing Everything Worth Having) in 1988 in the parking lot of Shea Stadium in Queens, New York. Using 22 tons of equipment the show included a shock wave cannon, a 4-legged walking machine, a high power flame thrower, a radio-controlled tank and a 1,200-pound catapult. The show was sponsored by the New York City arts groups The New Museum, Creative Time, and The Kitchen.

In 1989 the group presented Illusions of Shameless Abundance in San Francisco. The show, staged in the SOMA area under an on-ramp to the Bay Bridge, featured stacks of burning pianos, vats of spoiled food, and flame-breathing robots. The show's use of fake sculptures resembling high explosive devices led to beach closures and the involvement of the city's bomb squad the next day. The group produced the 1995 show Crime Wave in San Francisco.

Their 1996 show in Phoenix titled Survival Research Laboratories Contemplates a Million Inconsiderate Experiments, featured robots, flame throwers, and a V-1 jet engine. In 1997 SRL staged The Unexpected Destruction of Elaborately Engineered Artifacts in Austin, Texas. In 2006 they performed Ghostly Scenes of Infernal Desecration in San Jose, California. The performance featured an air launcher, a hovercraft, and a shockwave cannon.

== Reception ==
SRL has received serious consideration as not only a pioneer of industrial performance art, but also as a legitimate heir to the traditions of Dada and the art of Jean Tinguely in which paradoxical creations are used to call into question the state and direction of technological society.

In addition, many SRL members were later involved in other avant-garde artistic projects like the Cacophony Society, the Suicide Club, The Haters, Robochrist Industries, People Hater, Seemen, Burning Man, and robotics projects including Battlebots and Robot Wars.

SRL has been praised as being a place where many women have access to working with robotics and advanced machine workshop tools.

== List of SRL devices ==
See also Survival Research Laboratories' own list of machines

- The Demanufacturing Machine which "demanufactured" objects by shredding them and flinging them toward the audience. This device was featured at SRL's first show titled Machine Sex on February 25, 1979.
- Assured Destructive Capability – a robot that defecated on photographs of Soviet premier at the time.
- Flame Hurricane – five Pulsejet engines and louvers arranged in a circle to produce a rapidly rotating column of hot wind, plus flames
- Hand-O'-God - a giant spring-loaded hand, cocked by an air cylinder
- High Pressure Air Launcher – originally developed by NASA for use in avalanche control; fires beer cans filled with plaster using a CO_{2} charge. A parody of warfare technologies, with the device's operator wearing a head-mounted display.
- The Pitching Machine – a device which fires 2x4 pieces of lumber by pinching the lumber between two rotating automotive wheels driven by a powerful V8 engine
- Shockwave Cannon – a device which fires a shockwave of air, shattering glass remotely with the force, constructed similarly to the shockwave-based Wunderwaffen anti-bomber device or the so-called hail cannon.
- Six-Legged "Running" Machine – a gas-engine powered tripedal device featuring three pairs of legs which reciprocate using a chain-driven tank-tread-like actuator, alternately extending to provide locomotion. The front pair of legs pivots, providing steering, while the rear two pairs provide forward motion.
- Square Wheeled Car – industrial vehicle equipped with square wheels and no brakes or external control.
- 1984 Stu Walker – a spider-like flame-shooting robot that was controlled by the motions of Mark Pauline's pet guinea pig "Stu"
- The V1 – a replica of the engine of a World War II V1 flying bomb pulse jet
- Wheelocopter – a spinning machine which applies the principles of rotorcraft to a two-dimensional plane

== Accidents and controversies ==
In 1982 Pauline lost two fingers from his right hand while attempting to make solid rocket fuel. In 2011, SRL was banned from performing in the city by the San Francisco Fire Department. The 1989 San Francisco show Illusions of Shameless Abundance was cited as the reason for the ban.

The sound of 1991 test in San Francisco of a homemade V-1 rocket engine resulted in police attention and a reported 300 calls to the city's earthquake hotline.

In 2007, SRL crew member Todd Blair suffered a serious brain injury during the take-down of an SRL show at the Robodock Arts & Technology Festival in Amsterdam.
