= Desert Siteworks =

Art event associated with Burning Man

Desert Siteworks was an event held on the Black Rock Desert for three years (1992–1994). Participants built art and participated in self-directed performances.

== History ==
In 1992, Desert Siteworks was conceived and directed by William Binzen. Desert Siteworks was held at Black Rock Springs with about 20 participants over the summer solstice.

Binzen's "Desert House" was created for Desert Siteworks and in 1992 appeared at Burning Man on the Black Rock Desert playa as a gathering place, which predated Center Camp.

In 1993, Binzen and Judy West co-produced the event at Trego Hot Springs, with about 100 participants.

In mid-summer 1993, Pepe Ozan first built a Lingam at Desert Siteworks out of local clay at Trego. Ozan returned in August 1993 to build a larger one at Burning Man on the main playa and designed a ritual to go around the Lingam.

In 1994, the event was held over the summer solstice at Bordello Hot Springs, also known as Frog Pond at Garrett Ranch. Included was Paul Windsor's sand drawing titled "Celtic Endless Knot".

== Impact ==
Some key organizers of Burning Man were also part of Desert Siteworks (John Law, Michael Mikel) and William Binzen was a friend of Larry Harvey. Hence, the two events saw much cross-pollination of ideas and participants. Many of the principles developed at Desert Siteworks (such as Leave-No-Trace) were adopted by Burning Man.

In August 1994, at SOMAR Gallery in San Francisco, Adrienne Fuzee curated a show called "Primal Edge" that featured works from Desert Siteworks and Burning Man. The event was billed as a "collaborative urban experience" that featured "art installations, music, dance, projections and participator events."

In 2016, all of Binzen's Desert Siteworks sourcebooks, artist's notes and work prints became part of the historical archives at the Center for Art + Environment at the Nevada Museum of Art.
