= Brides of March =

Annual event in San Francisco, California

The Brides of March is an annual event that takes place in San Francisco, California and in cities internationally around March 15. Started by the Cacophony Society, the event's name is a pun on the term Ides of March, and is a parody of weddings in western culture. The event, which began in 1999, is part pub crawl and part street theater while wearing a thrift store wedding dress.

== History ==
Michele Michele got the idea while looking at used wedding dresses at a thrift store in 1999:

I saw a rack of used wedding dresses and realized how often the dream of an ideal marriage had failed and how so much of this dream has been fabricated in order to fuel the ever-increasing consumption of new products. I thought it would be funny to take the primary symbol of this sacred institution and twist it around, much like what the Cacophony Society did with the Santa Rampage. This is classic Situationist ‘Detournament’, the hijacking of a message.

Brides of any gender are encouraged to participate, but the wearing of traditional white wedding dresses or something resembling them, preferably obtained second-hand, is the point of the event. Variations on bridal themes are also highly encouraged - in recent years there have been a greater number of gothic brides who wear black, alien brides, bridezillas, priests, bunny brides, left-at-the-altar brides, Wonder Woman brides, wedding planners, clown brides, mail order brides, shotgun wedding brides, runaway brides, and others. Participants are encouraged to be creative when planning their attire, accessories, and props.

Brides of March 2024

Some Brides of March walking tours have had a story-line focus, with brides visiting local engagement ring shops, formal wear stores, bakeries, the Nordstrom makeup counter for touch ups, and other on-theme destinations in between pubs and restaurants. Others have a less formal walking tour, choosing a route that allows them to bar-hop as a group or even splinter off into several smaller groups.

The Brides of March is now held elsewhere in the US including Austin, Texas; Dallas, Texas, Boston, Massachusetts; Los Angeles and San Diego, California; Boulder, Colorado; New York City; Reno and Las Vegas, Nevada; Phoenix (started in 2008) and Tucson, Arizona; Portland, Oregon; Seattle, Washington and Lafayette, Indiana. In Canada, events are held in Toronto and in Vancouver and Victoria, British Columbia. Brides of March events are also held in London, Berlin, Melbourne and Japan.

Brides of March events in many cities were canceled in 2020 and 2021 due to the COVID-19 pandemic, but resumed in some cities beginning in 2022, including San Francisco.
