= Susan Block =

American therapist, author, filmmaker, and talk show host

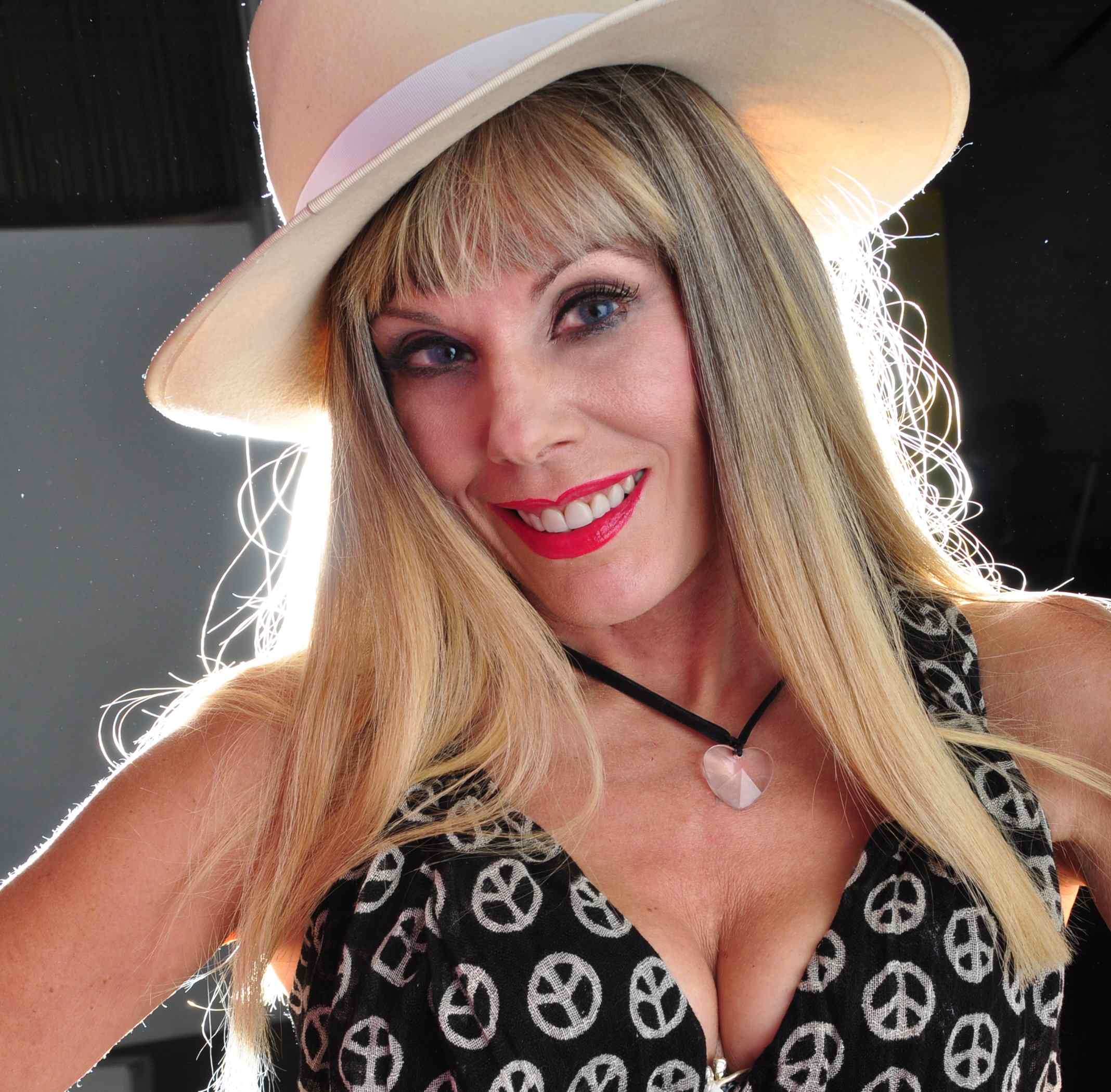
- Block in 2009
- Born: Philadelphia, Pennsylvania, U.S.
- Occupations: Sexologist; author; filmmaker; therapist; cable TV talk show host; cultural commentator
- Years active: 1977–present
- Known for: HBO television specials on philosophy of ethical hedonism and sexology

Susan Marilyn Block, also known as Dr. Suzy, is an American sex therapist, author, TV, radio and internet host and cultural commentator. She is perhaps best known for her television specials on HBO. She is the founder and director of The Dr. Susan Block Institute for the Erotic Arts & Sciences.

Block is also known for her philosophy of peace through pleasure, or The Bonobo Way, as well as her writings on sex, love, politics, and culture in CounterPunch, Alternet, The Ecologist, Perfect 10, the New Haven Advocate, LA Weekly, the San Francisco Bay Guardian, Metro, The Brentwood Bla Bla, Beverly Hills, The Magazine, and her own publications The Cannes Bla Bla and her blog and publication, Dr. Susan Block's Journal.

Block is also known for her for her Internet, TV and radio shows featuring professors and porn stars, erotic art exhibitions, sex educational salons, seminars and other events at the Dr. Susan Block Institute, Dr. Suzy's Speakeasy and Bonoboville in Los Angeles, including her bacchanalian celebrations.

== Biography ==
=== Early life ===
Block was born in Philadelphia, and grew up in Bala Cynwyd, Pennsylvania. Block comes from a Conservative Jewish upbringing. She was an honors student at Harriton High School, and was captain of the debate team, starred in school plays and was editor of her high school paper. She was accepted into Yale University in 1973, graduated from Yale magna cum laude, majoring in Theater Studies, in 1977. She received her master's and doctorate degrees in philosophy from Pacific Western University (now called California Miramar University) in 1991, a school without regional accreditation, and wrote her doctoral thesis on "Being A Woman: A Philosophical Analysis of the Four Aspects of Female Psychology According to Toni Wolff." In 2011 she was awarded an honorary doctorate by the Institute for the Advanced Study of Human Sexuality.

In the late 1970s and early 1980s, Block continued her studies in theater, sex and philosophy at PWU, San Francisco State, UC Berkeley, and the Naropa Institute. She also worked as a New Haven City Mime, performed as a member of the casts of New England Commedia and La Mer Mime, and Mask Theater. She climbed to the top of the Golden Gate Bridge, as well as the San Francisco–Oakland Bay Bridge, several times with members of the San Francisco Suicide Club. She also traveled extensively throughout the United States, Mexico, France, the Netherlands, Italy, Israel, Afghanistan, Pakistan, India and Nepal.

In 1982, Block directed the Heart and Dagger and LA All-Star poetry shows, at the Factory Place and Boyd Street Theaters in downtown Los Angeles. In 1983, she wrote and performed her one-woman show Mattress Madness.

In 1984, Block published her first book, Advertising for Love (William Morrow) which forecast the personal ad revolution that soon began in newspapers and magazines and now, the Internet.

In 1988, Block said she co-wrote Toni Grant’s Being a Woman: Fulfilling Your Femininity and Finding Love, and that Grant minimized her contribution as a co-writer of the book with an acknowledgement. Random House, the book’s publisher, denied the claim. However, it was reported that Block’s fee was $30,000 and 25% of the book’s royalties. Block also said the contract for her work on the book specified an acknowledgment, but that Grant said she would consider a credit on the cover.

=== Radio ===
Toward the end of that year, she began hosting her first radio talk show Radio Match, It was broadcast from KIEV in Glendale, California, where she helped singles meet on the air, (but only on the air). Later it went out as Date Night on Saturday nights. The content was largely provided by listeners, male and female, who would call in and be linked up with each other from the control room. The show was produced and financed by John Clark.

=== Marriage and collaboration with Lobkowicz ===
In late 1984, she met her husband-to-be Maximillian Rudolph Lobkowicz-Filangieri through KIEV. Though they became good friends, they were in relationships with other people, and didn't get romantically involved until six years later. In 1986, Block started some of the first 976 and 900 number telephone dating, advice and fantasy lines. In 1987, Block moved her radio program to KFOX 93.5 FM, where it became less of a matchmaking show and more of a call-in talk show about sex, politics and culture with guests like Dr. Timothy Leary, John Densmore of The Doors and comedian Sam Kinison. During this time, she also contributed short stories to Dr. Lonnie Barbach's anthologies, Pleasures, Erotic Interludes and The Erotic Encounter. She wrote the last story with Lobkowicz.

In 1990, Block collaborated with Lobkowicz to produce the audio cassette series "Desert Susan," distributed to the troops of Desert Storm, and "Bedtime Stories for Adults." They also published Dr. Block's Journal. In 1992, Block and Lobkowicz got married in Philadelphia. That same year, they began filming Block's radio show, now called The Dr. Susan Block Show, for cable TV. They also founded the Dr. Susan Block Institute for the Erotic Arts & Sciences. In 1993, Block's show was syndicated nationwide on over 75 radio stations through the Independent Broadcasters Network. In 1996, after the owners of IBN were indicted for fraud, Block started one of the Internet's first radio stations, RADIOSUZY1.com, where her show is still broadcast, live and taped, 24 hours a day. That year, she also hosted her first HBO special, Radio Sex TV with Dr. Susan Block, and published her third book The 10 Commandments of Pleasure: Erotic Keys to a Healthy, Sexual Life (St. Martin's Press).

=== The Bonobo Way ===
In 1994, Block first saw the "Make-Love-Not-War" bonobo chimpanzees on PBS, and in 1996, she started the Block Bonobo Foundation, an advocacy group for the highly endangered bonobos who also figure prominently in her book The 10 Commandments of Pleasure. Called "the Erin Brockovich of the Bonobo" by Salon, Block uses the highly sexual, relatively non-violent and non-male-dominant bonobo "lifestyle" as inspiration for her philosophy of "Ethical Hedonism," a.k.a. "The Bonobo Way of Peace through Pleasure." She contributes to the conservation efforts of the Bonobo Conservation Initiative and Lola ya Bonobo, among others. She has produced several bonobo oriented radio and TV shows and DVD's including "The Bonobo Conservation Revolution" with Deni Béchard, "The Bonobo Handshake" with Vanessa Woods, The Bonobo Imperative with Bushmeat Project Director Tony Rose, "Letter to Kabilah," "Peace, Love and Bonobos" with Sally Jewell Coxe and "The Bonobo Way" with Harvard anthropologist Richard Wrangham. She is also featured in the documentaries Cousin Bonobo and Humanimal, among others. Her book The Bonobo Way: The Evolution of Peace Through Pleasure was published in November 2014.

=== Sex, fetish, and Dr. Suzy's Speakeasy ===
In 1998, BlockFilms began producing the Encyclopedia of Sex & Fetish series, including "The New Horny Housewife", "Feet: An Erotic Study in Podophilic Sexuality", "Kenneth W. Starr: A Pornographer for Our Times", "Vibrators & other lovers", "The Fine Art of Fellatio", "Luscious Cunnilingus", "Sex Heals" and "Spanking for Adults Only,". Around this time, Block became a consultant for the Los Angeles Public Defender's Office, Death Penalty Sex Crimes Division.

Also, in 1998, she moved her institute and production company from the "Villa Piacere" in the Hollywood Hills to "Dr. Suzy's Speakeasy" in Downtown LA. "We call it a Speakeasy because we speak about subjects that are not so easy to speak about," says Block. The Speakeasy Gallery of Erotic Art exhibits erotic art works from artists around the world. Block's first gallery opening was featured on HBO's Real Sex. The scene at Dr. Suzy's Speakeasy is often described as "Felliniesque" and "Warholesque."

=== Eros Day ===
On January 22, 2000, Block, Lobkowicz and Lasse Braun, the "Father of Euro Porn," joined forces to produce the first celebration of "Eros Day," a holiday of lust and pleasure held on the day of the year when the planetoid 433 Eros is closest to Earth. The Block Institute celebrates Eros Day every January. In 2004, it was called Eros Day: The Counter-Inaugural Ball.

=== Freedom of speech, politics, and education ===
On the evening of February 26, 2000, for the second time in two years, armed officers of the Los Angeles Police Department invaded Block's television studio on the night of a live broadcast of The Dr. Susan Block Show. Though they spent several hours there, she was never charged. A year later, Block, acting in pro per, sued the LAPD for infringement of her First and Fourth Amendment rights, and won a settlement. Also in 2000, Block started fighting a public Freedom of Speech battle with Adelphia CEO John Rigas who censored the nudity on her Public-access television show. She told her viewers to "Dump Adelphia stock".

After the September 11, 2001 attacks, Block began writing The Terror Journals, a series of essays which Steven Mikulan in the LA Weekly called "among the most readable to come out of LA, smartly combining outrage...with levelheaded warnings about the loss of civil liberties."

Later in 2002, Block's show was threatened with censorship by Berkeley City Councilwoman Betty Olds in Berkeley, California. The Dr. Susan Block Show continues to broadcast without censorship on BTV, where it is produced by First Amendment advocate and artist Frank Moore. She ran for Vice President of the United States in 2008 as Moore's running mate for his independent presidential campaign.

In 2003, Block and Lobkowicz founded the Cannes Press Club in Cannes, France, began publishing the Cannes Bla Bla online, and broadcasting shows in Paris and the South of France. In 2004, she starred in The A-Z of Fetish.

=== Female ejaculation, health, and ethical hedonism ===
In 2005, Block produced, directed and hosted Dr. Suzy's Squirt Salon: Secrets of Female ejaculation, featuring Deborah Sundahl and Annie Body, premiering at the Barcelona Erotic Film Festival and New York City's CineKink Film Festival. Dr. John Perry, author of the best-seller The G-Spot, calls Dr. Suzy's Squirt Salon "Masterful...raising the bar for female ejaculation videos". In 2005, she also started working with award-winning filmmaker Canaan Brumley on a documentary entitled Speakeasy which will be released in 2008.

Besides ethical hedonism and the Bonobo Way, Block promotes what she calls "Pleasure Sex", sex that is recreational, healthful, relationship-oriented or celebratory as opposed to reproductive. She also advocates what she calls "Faith-Based Sex" and "Blue Values". Cara Jepsen put it this way in the Illinois Entertainer: "Dr. Susan Block's HBO specials expose inhibited Middle America to the idea that it's OK to discuss—and enjoy—sex..."

== Works by Block ==
=== Books ===
- The Bonobo Way: The Evolution of Peace Through Pleasure] (2014, ISBN 0692323767)
- The 10 Commandments of Pleasure (book and audio book, 1996)
- Advertising for Love (book, 1984)

=== Videos and television series ===
- Squirt Crazy (2007)
- Dommes & Hollie (2007)
- Weimar Love: Hot Sex in Pre-Nazi Berlin (2006)
- Blonde Island: An Island of Pleasure in a Sea of War (2006)
- Double-Annie Squirting Anniversary (2006)
- Zorthian: Art & Times (2006)
- Yale's Whim 'n Rhythm at Dr. Suzy's Speakeasy (2006)
- Max's Birthday (2006)
- Dr. Suzy's Squirt Salon: The Secrets of Female Ejaculation (2005)
- HOODS & handjobs: Anti-War Insurgency & Orgasmic Sex (2004)
- Sex Heals (2003)
- Bellydance, Bukkake & Other Beauty Tips for the Horny (video, 2003)
- Adelphiagate (2002)
- The Bonobo Imperative (2001)
- Eros Day: Holiday of Love & Lust (2000)
- Inner Space: A Sex Odyssey (2000)
- Dr. Suzy's Speakeasy (HBO television special, 1999)
- Spanking for Adults Only (1999)
- The New Horny Housewife (1998)
- Kenneth W. Starr: A Pornographer for Our Times (1998)
- Feet: An Erotic Study in Podophilac Sexuality (1997)
- Radio Sex TV (HBO TV series, 1996– )
- The Bonobo Way (1996)
- Real Sex (HBO TV series, 1994)
- How to Give a Woman Pleasure (1992)

== Art exhibits ==
- Eros Day (2005)
- Republican Torture (2004)
- Democratic Sex (2000)
- Erotic Art of the Apocalypse (1999)
- Sex Acts with the Artist Heilman-C at Jack Tilton Gallery (interactive art exhibit, 1997)

== Other ==
- Bedtime Stories for Adults (audio series, 1991), featuring "The Great Train Ride", "Passions of the Plaza" and "Office Fantasies"
- Dr. Susan Block's Journal (magazine, 1991)
- Desert Susan (audio series, 1990)
- The Dr. Susan Block Show (radio show, 1984– ), formerly called Radio Match, Date Nite and The Susan Block Show, Block's talk show has gone from radio to cable TV to the Internet. As of 2007, Block has produced over 1000 installments of her radio program, over 800 Public-access cable TV shows and many more Internet shows.
- Mattress Madness (performance poetry, 1983)
- Chaingangs (play, 1978)
