= Art of Bleeding =

Los Angeles-based performance troupe

Art of Bleeding was a Los Angeles–based multi-media performance troupe providing darkly comic, faux-educational programs in first-aid and safety at clubs, galleries and art events. Staging shows from an actual ambulance, The Art of Bleeding created what their press release referred to as a "paramedical funhouse" wherein puppets and costumed characters interacted with a crew of nurses wearing medical-themed fetish gear. Events were hosted by costumed characters reminiscent of children's programming including the company's "beloved mascot," Abram the Safety Ape and RT, the Robot Teacher. In their performances and web videos, the group promoted an ill-defined and intentionally cryptic metaphysical doctrine that they called "True Safety Consciousness."

The group's ambulance also functioned as a mobile recording studio for their Gory Details Project, in which true-life tales of medical trauma were gathered from passersby to be shared in an online library of movies and mp3s. Some of these stories were also re-enacted within the framework of what would appear to be a tragically misguided children's show, the "Gory Details" web series.

In addition to live shows, videos, recordings, and paramedical-themed music, The Art of Bleeding also choreographed public performances of bandaged and crutch-enabled dancers, created grisly anatomical walk-through installations, and staged a parking-lot display of smoldering, freshly wrecked cars peopled with bloodied actors sharing their cautionary tales.

The troupe was founded by Al Ridenour, former leader of the Los Angeles branch of the Cacophony Society. When asked about the nature of his group, Ridenour has said, "Think of Art of Bleeding as a sort of public outreach multi-media brainwashing course in emergency medicine, and you'll have a good handle on it. At least better than me...".

Ridenour's then-wife Margaret Cho was featured in a March 29, 2006, performance.
