= Christian Ristow =

American robotic artist

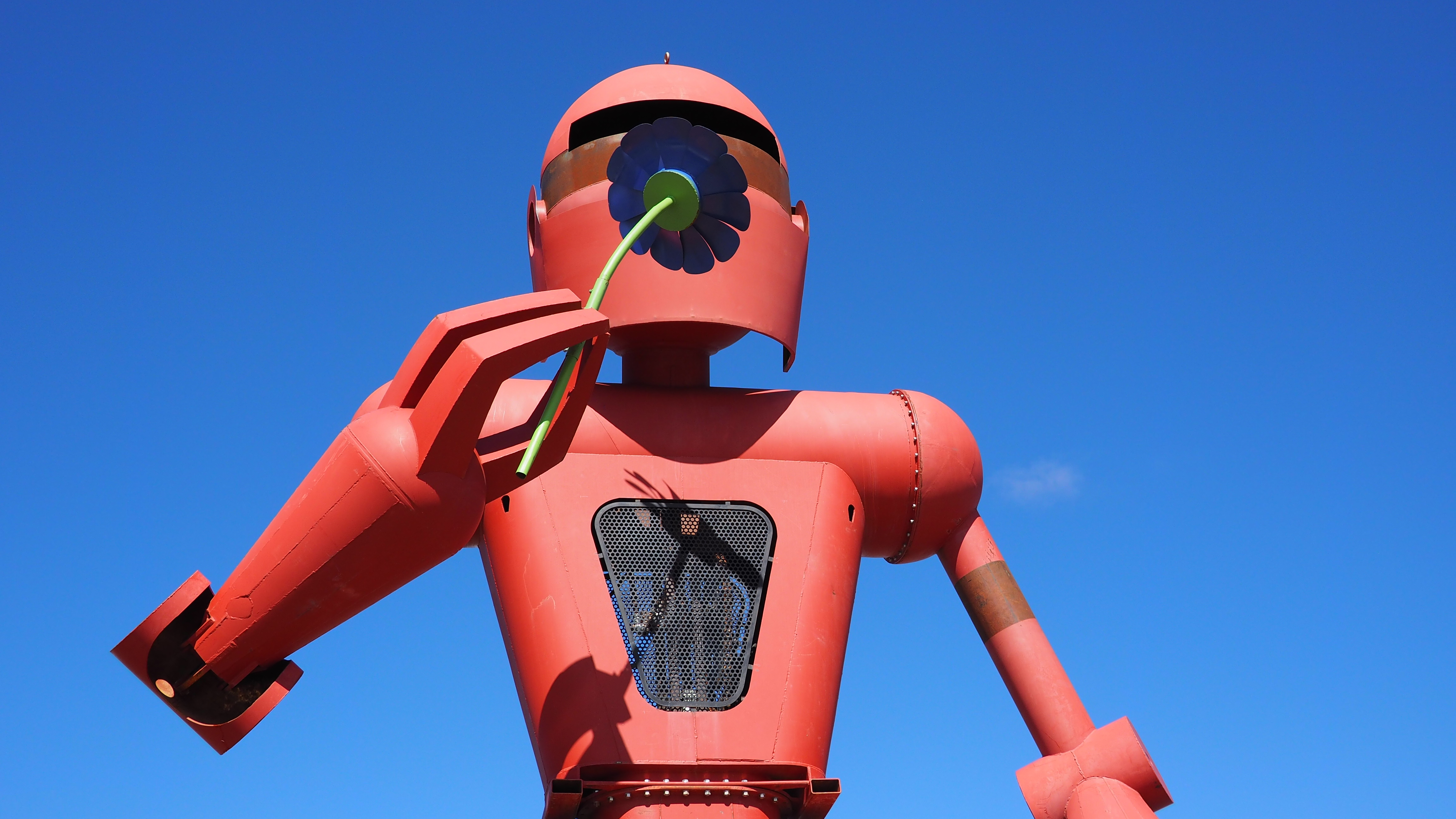
- Ristow's "Becoming Human" sculpture, on display at Meow Wolf in Santa Fe, New Mexico.
- Born: July 2, 1970 (age 56)

Christian Ristow (born July 2, 1970) is an American robotic artist. He is known for his robotic performance art under the name Robochrist Industries, his animatronics work in film and television, and his large-scale interactive sculptures.

== Life and career ==
From 1993 to 1997, Ristow volunteered for the seminal robotic performance art collective Survival Research Laboratories in San Francisco, California. During these years Ristow was involved in several SRL performances, contributing not only props but also, particularly in the years 1996 and 1997, robots that he had constructed. During this period Ristow also participated in several collaborative performances with another San Francisco based performance group, The Seemen, including the often cited Hellco performance at the 1996 Burning Man festival.

In 1997 Ristow relocated to Los Angeles to work in the field of animatronics for film and television. Los Angeles also provided fresh audiences uninitiated to the world of robot performance art, which was already becoming well known in northern California. Shortly thereafter the name "Robochrist Industries" was first used and a small group of volunteers coalesced to form a working performance group. The gradual inclusion of artistic and technical professionals from disciplines such as film special effects and the aerospace industry helped fuel larger and more frequent shows over the ensuing years.

Starting in 1999 Ristow and cohorts began performing at the Coachella Valley Music and Arts Festival. These shows represented the apex of the group's activities, both in terms of fully realized spectacle and audience exposure. The 2006 film "Coachella" features footage culled from Robochrist performances from several different years as well as a brief interview with Ristow.

In early 2006 Ristow again relocated, this time leaving Los Angeles for Taos, New Mexico, effectively killing Robochrist Industries.

The relocation to New Mexico marked a significant turn in Ristow's artistic output, away from robot-based ensemble performances, and in the direction of large-scale interactive sculpture. The list of notable large-scale sculptures built since that time includes Hand of Man (2008), Fledgling (2011), Face Forward (2011), Becoming Human (2014), and With Open Arms We Welcomed That Which Would Destroy Us (2018). These pieces have been shown at Burning Man, the Coachella Valley Music and Arts Festival, Big Day Out (Australia), The Voodoo Experience (New Orleans, Louisiana), Maker Faire, and The Glastonbury Festival (England).

In July 2022, Ristow married Christina Sporrong and later that year moved to Sweden where the pair now lives on an old farm north of Lund in Skåne.
