= Matt Heckert =

American sound artist (born 1957)

Matt Heckert is an American sound artist, born in 1957. He was involved in Survival Research laboratories in the 1980s before becoming a machine musical artist.

Matt Heckert graduated from the San Francisco Art Institute in 1979 with a Bachelor of Fine Arts and joined the machine performance art group Survival Research Laboratories in 1980. Matt Heckert's main work in the group centered on the acoustic and musical parts of performance.

He left the group in 1988 to follow his musical interests, developing the Mechanical Sound Orchestra (MSO). The MSO was awarded the Golden Nica at the Ars Electronica 1997 for Digital Musics. The collection of sound machines has toured the US and Europe extensively.
