= Trego Hot Springs =

Trego Hot Springs Trego, Hot Springs, Kyles Hot Springs, Butte Spring, and Butte Hot Spring
- Ghost town
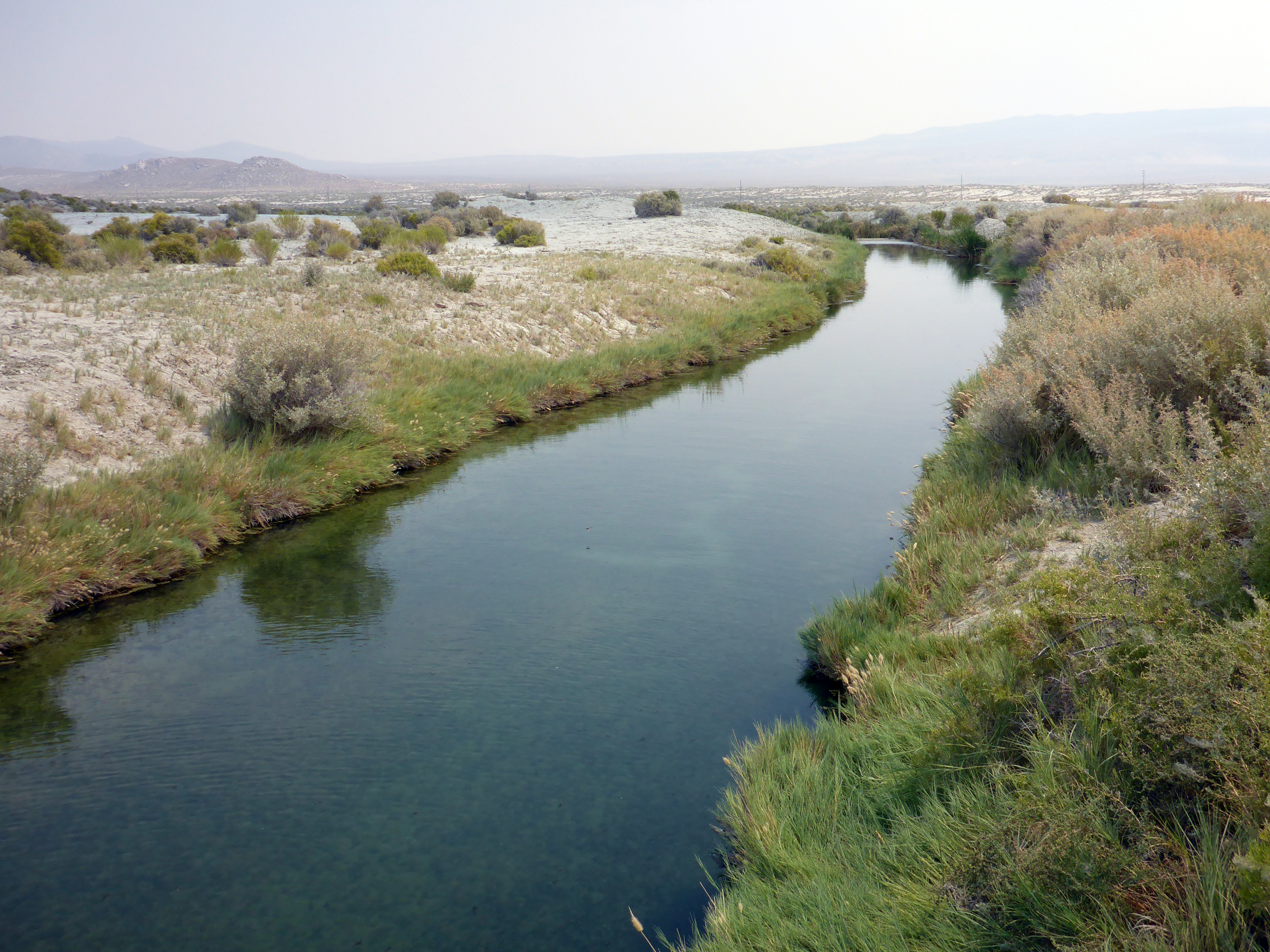
- Trego hot springs
- Etymology: Named after nearby Mount Trego
- Interactive map of Trego Hot Springs
- Coordinates: 40°46′18″N 119°07′01″W
- Country: United States
- State: Nevada
- County: Pershing
- Established: early 1900s
- Elevation: 3,940 ft (1,200 m)
- Time zone: UTC-8 (Pacific (PST))
  - Summer (DST): PDT (UTC-7)

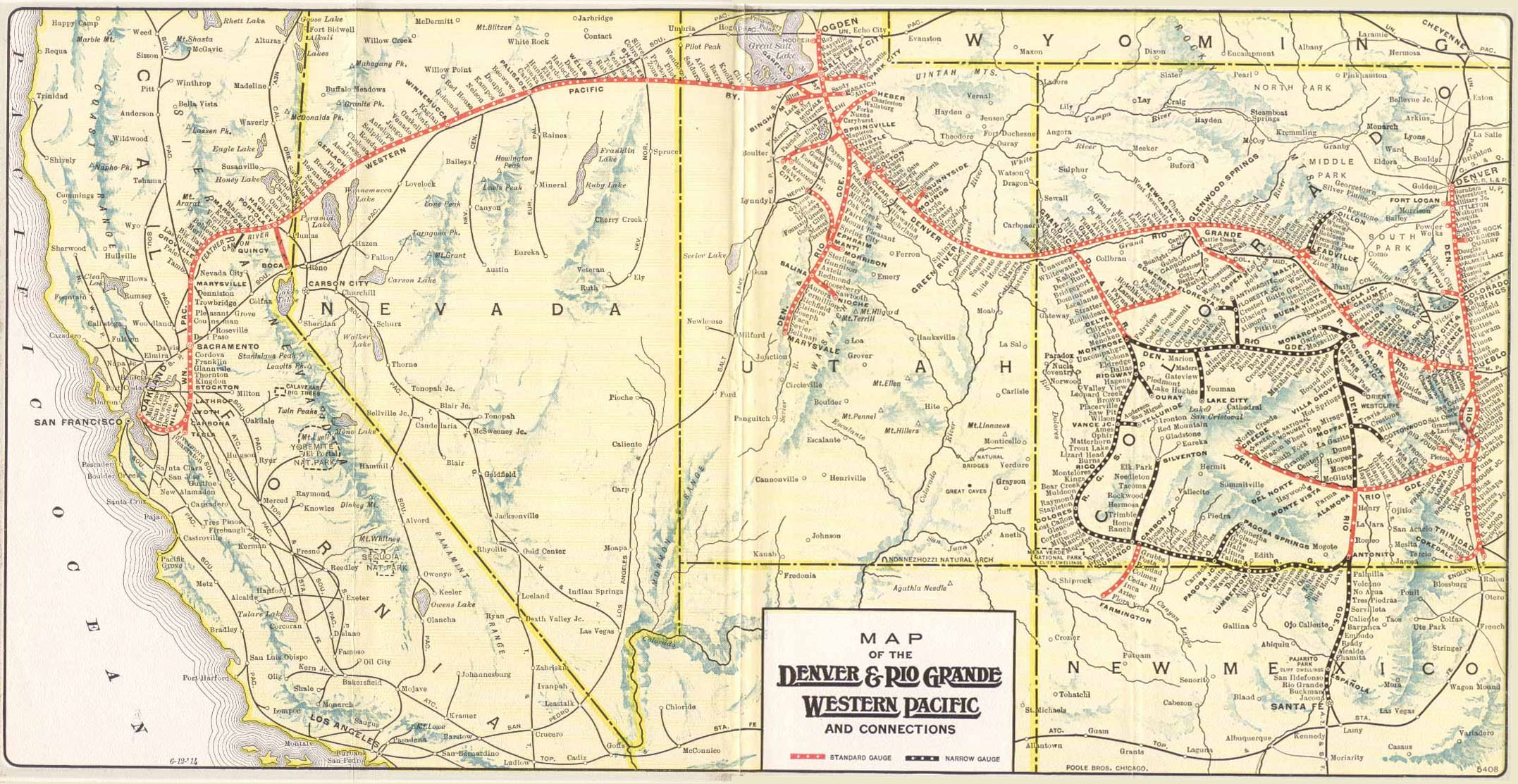
1914 WPRR map with Gerlach, Ascalon, Trego, Cholona, Ronda, and Sulphur, Nevada

Trego Hot Springs is located in the Black Rock Desert at the location of Trego, Nevada, a former station on the Western Pacific Railroad. The name "Trego" dates from the 1910s, just after the railroad was built. Previously, the springs had names like Hot Springs, Kyles Hot Springs (1864), Butte Spring, and Butte Hot Spring.

Today, Trego is known for its hot springs, which is a long ditch with a soft mud bottom. The springs are at the north end, near the railroad tracks, and the water flows south. Garside reports that the springs have a temperature of 187F. Unlike nearby Frog Springs at the Garrett Ranch, Trego is on public land.

== History ==
The area near the springs were seasonally occupied from 4000 B.P. and 1000 B.P.

Fairfield states that in 1856, Ladue Vary and Fred Hines discovered the springs that were later named Trego Hot Springs when they took a short cut from Granite Creek (now known as Granite Ranch) across the Black Rock Desert playa towards Rabbit Hole Spring. When they arrived at the Humboldt River, the met a wagon train on the Nobles Emigrant Trail. Vary and Hines told the emigrants about the springs, the emigrants took the shortcut and the Nobles trail was adjusted accordingly. "Hot Spr" appears on the 1857 map "Map of the Western Division of the Fort Kearney South Pass and Honey Lake Road" at that location.

The 400 foot long trench was initially hand dug by a group led by Frederick W. Lander in 1860. The trench cooled the water that flowed to a large tank.

Amesbury reports two 1861 entries from the diary of Edith Lockhart:

"August 18: Pleasant day. Started at noon and went 18 miles to Rabbit Hole Springs, rested a couple of hours and went 18 more miles by the next day to Hot Springs."

"Aug. 19. A warm day - got into camp at 10 oclock in this morning, laid over till evening - when we went 12 miles to Granite Creek or Wells."

The area was named Trego around the time the railroad came through in the early 1900s. Carlson states that Trego was named after nearby Mount Trego, which is formally known as Old Razorback Mountain. The name Mount Trego only appears on the Pershing County Assessors Map. The earliest citation for Trego from an original source is from an April 29, 1912 newspaper article that states that "Borax" in the water was the cause of a train engine boiler explosion that killed three people.

In 1993, Desert Siteworks was held at Trego. Desert Siteworks was a series of art events led by William Binzen, assisted by Judy West and John Law for three years (1992-1994). Many of the principles developed at Desert Siteworks (such as Leave-No-Trace) were adopted by Burning Man.

In 2020, the Bureau of Land Management reported that Trego Hot Springs was contaminated with E. Coli, Fecal coliforms and Vibrio cholerae and advised the public to avoid bathing.
