= John Law (artist) =

American artist and cultural figure; co-founder of Burning Man

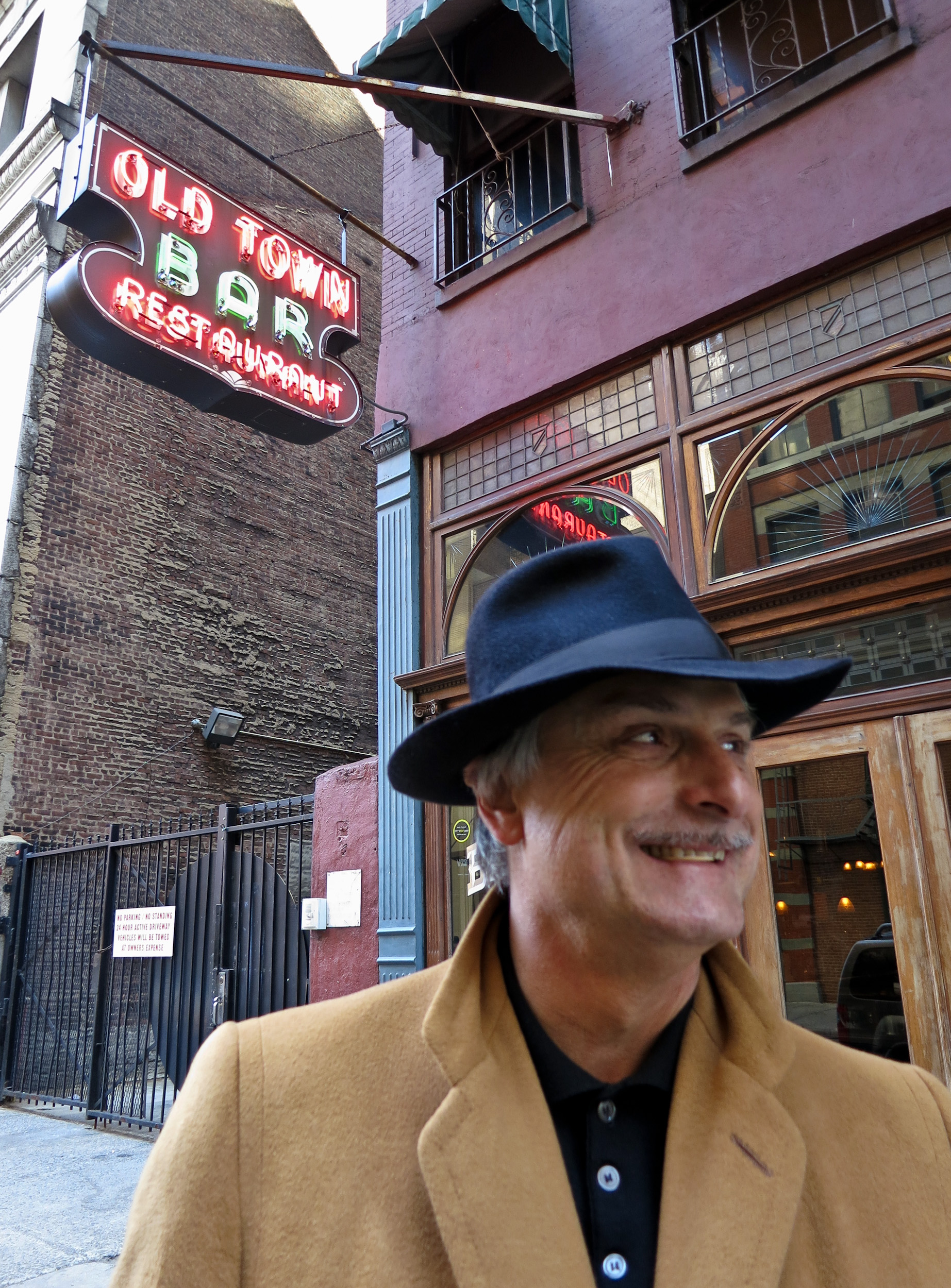
- John Law in front of the Old Town Bar and Restaurant, New York City, November 5, 2011.
- Born: November 17, 1958 (age 67); Michigan, U.S.
- Occupations: Artist; Culture jammer Neon sign technician Prankster; Urban explorer
- Years active: 1977–present
- Known for: Co-founder of Burning Man; Early member of the Cacophony Society; Member of the Suicide Club; Co-founder of the Billboard Liberation Front; Co-author of Tales of the San Francisco Cacophony Society
- Website: https://johnwlaw.com/

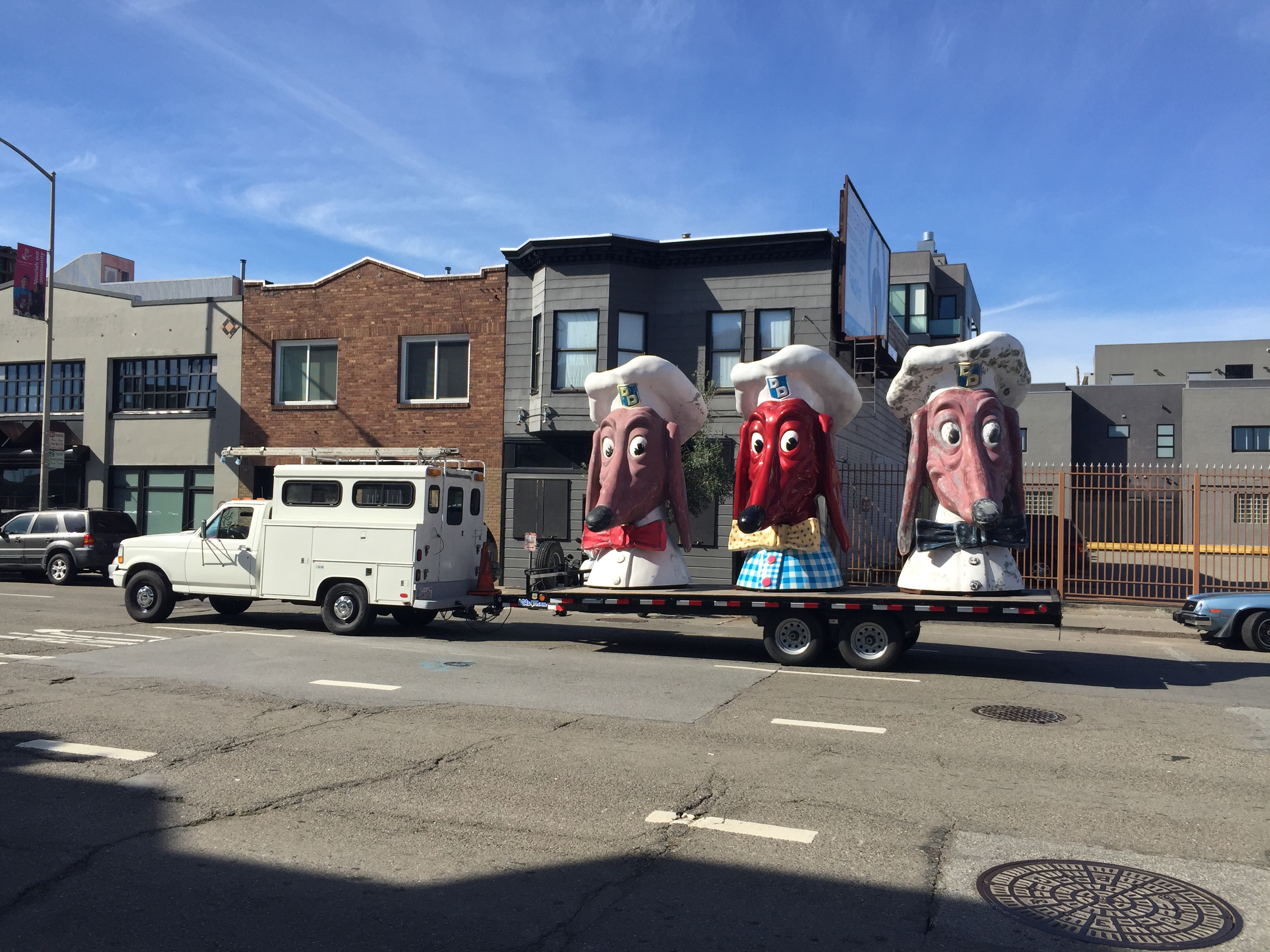
Manny, Moe and Jack, three of the 12 remaining Doggie Diner heads from San Francisco.

John Law (born November 17, 1958) is an American artist, culture-jammer, and neon sign technician. He was a primary member of the Cacophony Society and a member of the Suicide Club. He is also a co-founder of Burning Man (a.k.a. Zone Trip #4, a.k.a. Black Rock City) which evolved out of the spirit of the Cacophony Society when a precursor solstice party was banned from San Francisco's Baker Beach and merged with another Cacophony event on the Black Rock desert in Nevada. Originally from Michigan, Law has lived in San Francisco, California since 1976, and has maintained the signage and clock face of the Tribune Tower in Oakland, where he also has an office, since 1996.

== Art projects ==
Law has worked for many years as a commercial neon contractor. His neon artistic projects have included re-configuring the neon of a Camel cigarette billboard to say "Am I dead yet" as part of the Billboard Liberation Front, underwater neon art as part of Desert Siteworks at Trego Hot Springs in the Black Rock Desert, neon illumination of the man at Burning Man through 1996. He has also been responsible for maintaining the neon of the Tribune Tower in Oakland, CA.

Law owns and maintains three of the 12 remaining Doggie Diner heads, which were located above the restaurants of a small fast food chain in San Francisco and Oakland. The dog heads were featured in a 2003 movie called "Head Trip" that featured a cross-country trip with the Doggie Diner heads, ending in a show by Cyclecide at CBGB in New York City.

== Urban exploration ==
Law has participated in urban exploration for over three decades, starting with the Suicide Club (1977–1982). He has climbed the Golden Gate Bridge many times and explored underground bunkers.

== Cacophony Society ==
John Law is one of the early members of the Cacophony Society, a Culture jamming group with open membership, inspired in part by his earlier participation in the Suicide Club, which was in turn influenced by dadaists and situationists. Cacophony Society began in San Francisco, California, but eventually spread to most major cities in the United States and some outside the US. Claims have been made that Cacophony Society no longer exists, although some chapters are still active.

In 2013 John Law, along with Kevin Evans and Carrie Galbraith, co-authored "Tales of the San Francisco Cacophony Society", a book published by Last Gasp documenting the San Francisco Cacophony Society.

== Burning Man ==
Burning Man began as a bonfire ritual on the summer solstice in 1986 when Larry Harvey, Jerry James and a few friends met on Baker Beach in San Francisco and burned an 8 feet (2.4 m) tall wooden man as well as a smaller wooden dog.

In 1990, a separate event was planned by Kevin Evans and John Law on the remote and largely unknown dry lake known as Black Rock Desert, about 110 miles north of Reno, Nevada. Evans conceived it as a dadaist temporary autonomous zone with sculpture to be burned and situationist performance art. He asked John Law, who also had experience on the dry lake and was a defining founder of Cacophony Society, to take on central organizing functions. In the Cacophony Society's newsletter, it was announced as Zone No. 4, A Bad Day at Black Rock (inspired by the 1955 film of the same name).

Meanwhile, the beach burn was interrupted by the park police for not having a permit. After striking a deal to raise the Man but not to burn it, event organizers disassembled the effigy and returned it to the vacant lot where it had been built. Shortly thereafter, the legs and torso of the Man were chain-sawed and the pieces removed when the lot was unexpectedly leased as a parking lot. The effigy was reconstructed, led by Dan Miller, Harvey's then-housemate of many years, just in time to take it to Zone Trip No. 4.

Michael Mikel, another active Cacophonist, realized that a group unfamiliar with the environment of the dry lake would be helped by knowledgeable persons to ensure they did not get lost in the deep dry lake and risk dehydration and death. He took the name Danger Ranger and created the Black Rock Rangers. Thus the seed of Black Rock City was germinated, as a fellowship, organized by Law and Mikel, based on Evans' idea, along with Harvey and James' symbolic man.

The three most well-known founders and present partners in ownership of its name and trademark (Law, Michael Mikel, and Larry Harvey) were known as "The Temple of the Three Guys".

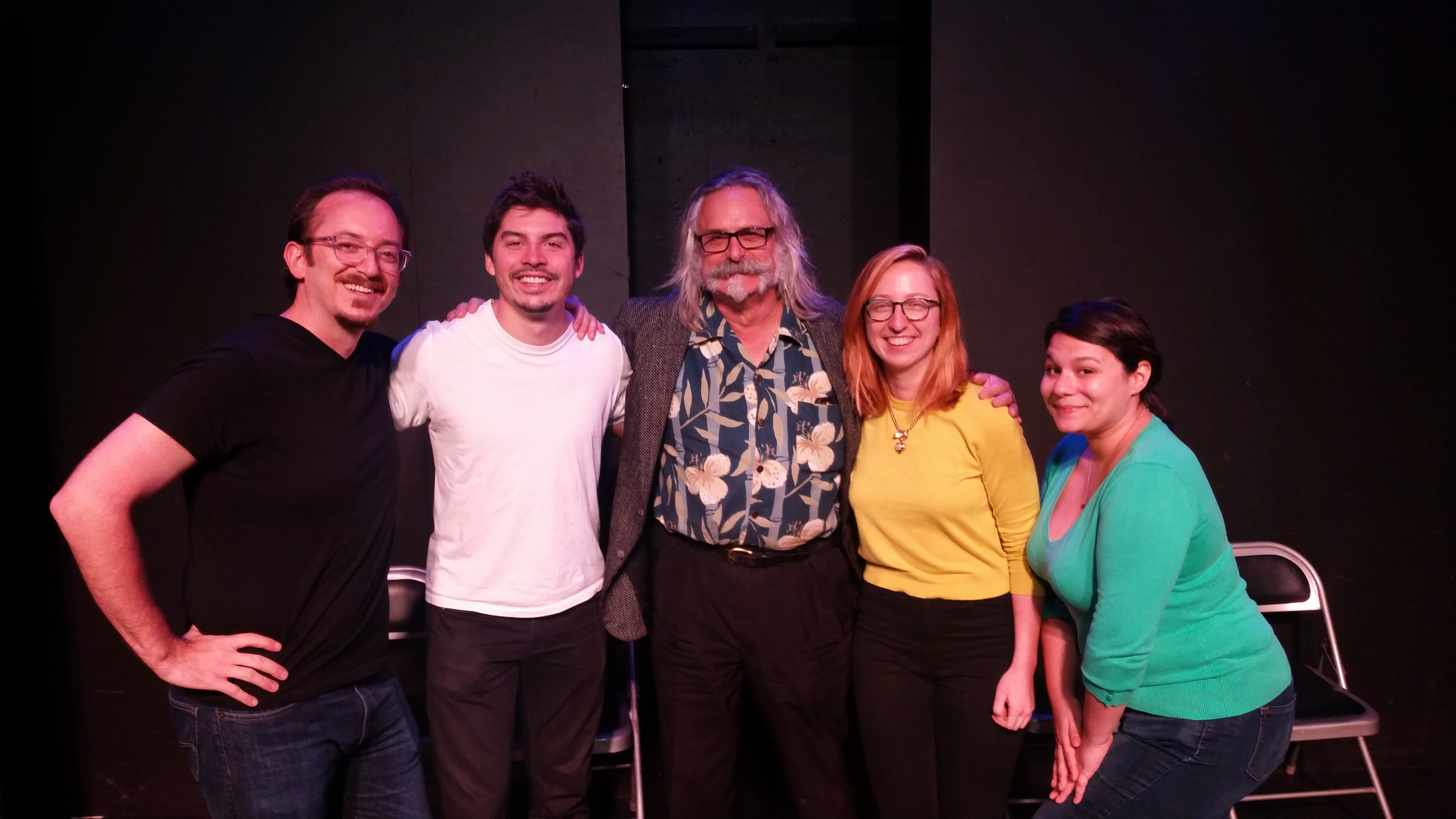
John Law, center, guest on Night School, a show at Endgames Improv

=== Artistic contributions ===
Law, a neon sculptor and artist, originated the concept and design of installing neon on the Man at Burning Man , an act which at once created an invaluable navigation aid and an indelible, omnipresent symbol. At that time, Burning Man had no streets, street signs, fences, or any other artificially imposed boundaries, and it took place in the virtually featureless deep playa (on which it may be easy to lose one's bearings or misjudge distances and wind up stranded alone in the desert). The decision to implement neon into the Man may have added to the safety of the event.

The early years of the festival allowed driving throughout the city but eventually curbed the practice back to only art cars. The symbol of the Burning Man, which had been added to the desert event later and was not part of its initial inception, became more and more identified with the event, in part because with the addition of the neon it was always universally visible, becoming the single unchanging reference point psychologically as well as physically.

=== Founders' conflict ===
The last year John Law attended Burning Man was in 1996 when his friend, Michael Furey died in a motorcycle crash while setting up the event and a couple were run over in a tent by an inattentive driver attempting to get to the distant rave camp. After Law and Larry Harvey had fierce disagreements about these incidents and other issues, he left in disgust proclaiming that the event should not continue.

In 2007, the three partners were engaged in a legal struggle over control of the name and symbol of Burning Man. Law's response to this struggle was to take legal action to dissolve the controlling partnership and release the name and symbol into the public domain. The final outcome was settled out of court in 2008 with Law's interest being bought out by the current organizers which also ended the "Temple of the Three Guys" partnership.

== Publications ==
- "The Space Between" (2009, Furnace Press; ISBN 978-0977274246). Three short stories about bridges.
- "Tales of the San Francisco Cacophony Society" by Carrie Galbraith (author), John Law (author), Kevin Evans (editor) (2013, Last Gasp; ISBN 0867197749).
