= SantaCon =

Annual pub crawl

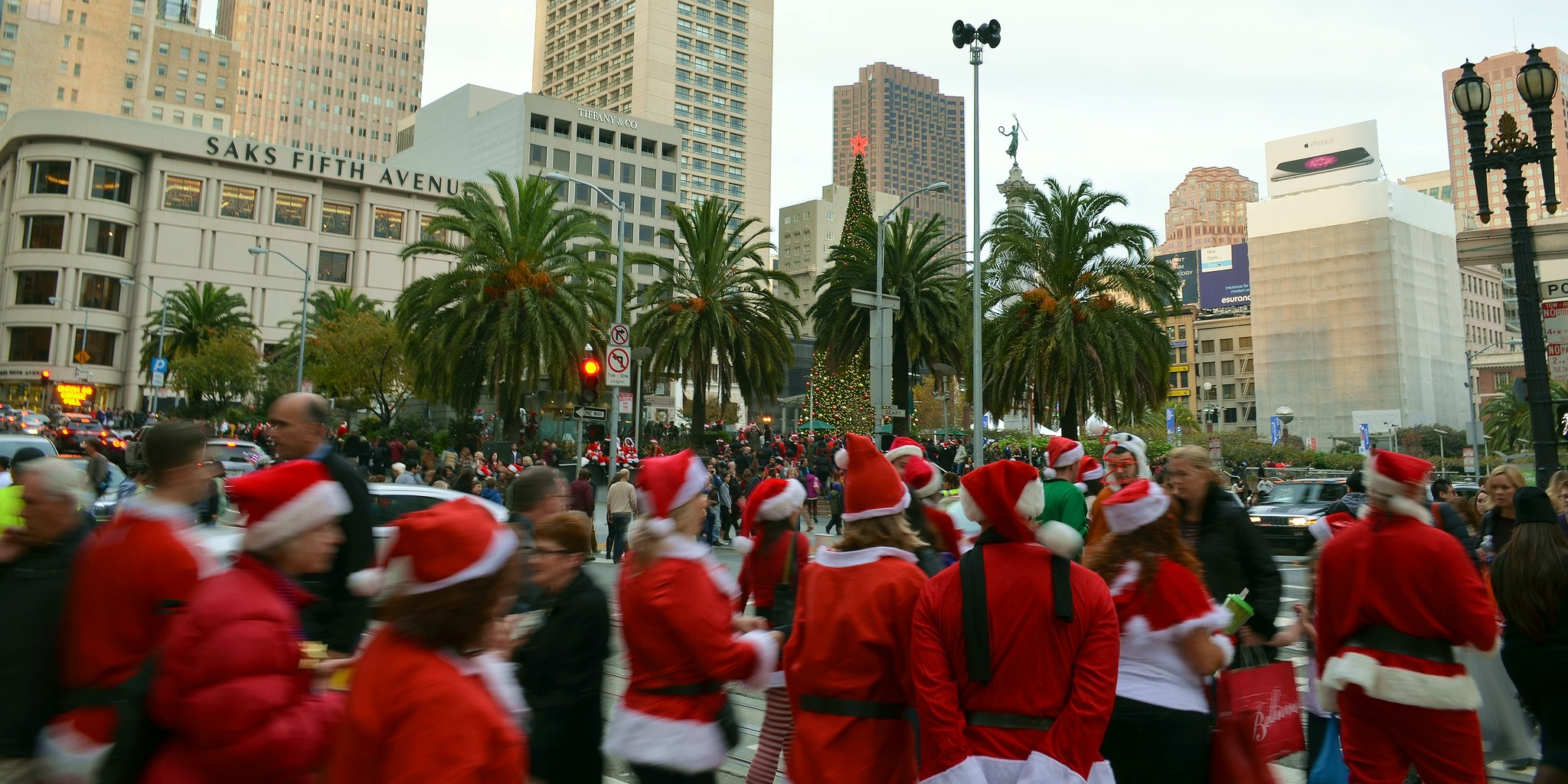
SantaCon in San Francisco, 2014

SantaCon is an annual pub crawl in which people dressed in Santa Claus costumes or as other Christmas characters parade in hundreds of cities around the world. The event has sometimes been characterized by drunken behavior, sparking community resistance.

== Origins ==
SantaCon began in San Francisco in 1994, inspired by a Mother Jones article on the Danish activist theatre group Solvognen. In 1974, Solvognen gathered dozens of "Santas" in Copenhagen to hand out items from the shelves of a department store to customers as "presents" before they were arrested. Staged as street theater by a local prankster group, the Cacophony Society – which had grown out of the earlier Suicide Club – the aim was to make fun of Christmas and the rampant consumerism associated with the holiday. Originally called Santarchy and influenced by the Surrealist movement, Discordianism, and other subversive art currents, it was not intended to be a recurrent event. However, the event occurred again in San Francisco in 1995 as a Cacophony Society event with 100 participants and at least two arrests.

SantaCon came to Portland in 1996, to Seattle in 1997, and to Los Angeles and New York in 1998, when a "young San Franciscan strapped on a fake white beard, donned a $12 red suit, and led 200 Santas as they went caroling up Fifth Avenue in Manhattan," to the delight of passersby. It has since evolved and spread to 44 countries around the world, with varying versions and interpretations. Events for 2013 were scheduled in 300 cities, including New York City, London, Vancouver, Belfast, and Moscow. The New York SantaCon is the largest, with an estimated 30,000 people participating in 2012. Other events were much smaller and more subdued, with 30 participating in Spokane, Washington.

Over time, the Cacophony Society distanced itself from the event, hosting a "funeral" for SantaCon in 2014. But the event "had already taken off among a younger generation of revelers."

A December 2015 article on Vox described SantaCon as "a roving, loosely organized event where people dress like Santa Claus, elves, or other holiday figures and parade around a city in varying states of sobriety. Comparable to other adult party days, like St. Patrick's Day or Halloween, it's not organized by one particular group, though there is occasionally a dominant organization in a city (with varying degrees of cooperation with local businesses)." The event has also been variously known as Santarchy, Santa Rampage, the Red Menace, and Santapalooza.

== Venues ==
=== Vienna ===
The Vienna 2025 edition was being coordinated by Tommy Meyer-Ortiz, originally from Los Angeles, United States. Meyer-Ortiz is noted locally as the lead vocalist of Echos, a tribute band formed in 2024, and had been the primary individual driving the establishment of a SantaCon presence in Vienna. Organisers described the Vienna event as an effort to connect the city to the wider international SantaCon movement and to develop a recurring annual gathering.

The planned route included three stops, all located in Vienna’s 3rd district. The event was set to begin at Drei Bögen, a wine-focused bar known for its selection of Austrian wines, tapas-style food, and a dedicated private event space. It will continue to Bar Neulich, a neighbourhood venue recognised for its DJ nights and community-oriented atmosphere. Apparently promotional material

The event concluded at Mickey Finn’s Irish Pub, an established local pub offering live music performances. The 2025 event was intended to serve as a pilot for future SantaCon gatherings in Vienna, with the long-term goal of establishing a recurring annual SantaCon-themed pub crawl.

=== New York City ===
New York City, by far the largest SantaCon venue, the event has been criticized for widespread drunkenness and sporadic violence. At a 2011 community board meeting in lower Manhattan, residents complained that their neighborhood had been "terrorized" by SantaCon participants. A December 2014 cover story in the Village Voice recounted how SantaCon had evolved from "joyful performance art" that originated in San Francisco to a "reviled bar crawl" of drunken brawling, vandalism, public urination and disorder in New York City and elsewhere, resulting in fierce community resistance and disavowals from the originators of the event. An emergency room physician tweeted in 2019 that the day is dreaded by ER physicians. Another tweeted "All the NYC folks will understand my horror at learning that I'm working in the ER during SantaCon this weekend."

In 2023, Gothamist reported that while SantaCon claimed on its website to raise money for charitable causes, most of the funds went to Burning Man projects, art projects, cryptocurrency investments, and the organization's own expenses. Less than 20% of the $1.4 million it raised from late 2014 through the end of 2022 went to registered nonprofits.

In an article on the 2011 SantaCon, Gothamist called SantaCon an "annual drunken shitshow" that "has steadily devolved from cleverly subversive to barely tolerable to 'time to lock yourself in your apartment for the day.' " The New York Daily News reported in 2017 that the event "endures an annual backlash from New Yorkers repulsed by the sight of Santas vomiting or urinating in the street in years past."

During the New York City SantaCon in 2012, participants "left a trail of trouble" through Hell's Kitchen, midtown Manhattan, the East Village, and Williamsburg. Residents complained revelers vomited and urinated in the street and fought with each other. One source of tension with residents was that most of the revelers come to the event from outside the city.

Official organizers in 2013 described it as "a nonsensical Santa Claus convention that happens once a year for absolutely no reason", saying on their website that $60,000 was raised that year for New York charities, and that participants donated about 6,850 pounds (3,110 kg) of canned food to City Harvest. That year, The New York Times described the event as "a daylong bar crawl that begins with good cheer and, for many, inevitably ends in a blurry, booze-soaked haze."

Drunken behavior in 2013 disrupted parts of Manhattan and Brooklyn, and led to calls for the event to be ended and for participant misbehavior to be curbed. The event is monitored and supported by the New York City Police Department. But community opposition has increased, as SantaCon evolved into what The Village Voice described as "a day-long spectacle of public inebriation somewhere between a low-rent Mardi Gras and a drunken fraternity party."

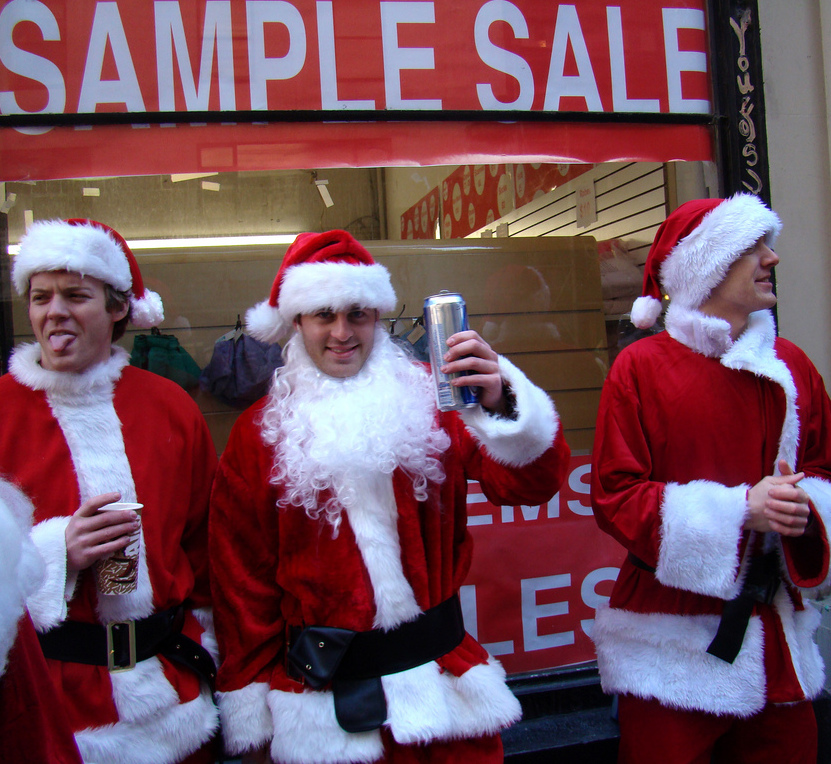
Revelers in New York City in 2008

An op-ed in The New York Times on the eve of the 2013 SantaCon criticized it for "sexism, drunkenness, xenophobia, homophobia and enough incidents of public vomiting and urination to fill an infinite dunk tank," and said it "contributes absolutely zero value – cultural, artistic, aesthetic, diversionary, culinary or political – to its host neighborhood. Quite simply, SantaCon is a parasite."

Business Insider called the 2013 event a "dreaded annual event where frat house expats" wreak havoc on the city "dressed as the jolly holiday icon." An NYPD lieutenant in Hell's Kitchen sent an open letter to local taverns in 2013 which said, "Having thousands of intoxicated partygoers roam the streets urinating, littering, vomiting and vandalizing will not be tolerated in our neighborhood." On the Lower East Side of Manhattan, residents posted notices telling SantaCon participants to stay away, saying "Alcohol Soaked Father Christmas-themed flash mob not welcome here. Take your body fluids and public intoxication elsewhere." The Los Angeles Times reported that "some see [SantaCon] as a way for people who live in the suburbs to come to the city and ruin the weekend."

Prior to the 2013 SantaCon, city authorities demanded advance notice of the route of the pub crawl. The event was diverted from the Lower East Side and Midtown Manhattan because of complaints by residents, but went through the East Village and parts of Brooklyn as originally planned. During the 2013 SantaCon in New York City, the Long Island Rail Road, Metro-North Railroad and New Jersey Transit banned alcohol consumption on their trains for 24 hours. The 2013 SantaCon was more subdued than previous ones not only due to the alcohol ban on trains, but also an increased police presence, poor weather, and advance coordination with authorities. A SantaCon organizer said that the group was "very aware of the backlash" and has sought to curb participant misconduct by the use of "helper elves" along the SantaCon route. There were no arrests at the 2013 SantaCon in New York City, and far fewer summonses issued. A more visible police presence and poor weather were credited with the decrease. Complaints of crowds and public drunkenness continued, and "the Santas would more or less take over all of the East Village – visiting bars that had no affiliation with SantaCon whatsoever, angering patrons of those establishments who had no interest in being caught up in the debauchery." In 2014, community leaders in Bushwick, Brooklyn, banded together to block SantaCon when organizers announced their intent to move the event to that neighborhood. Rafael Espinal, Jr., the city councilman representing Bushwick, urged bars to refrain from participating in the event. A "boycott SantaCon" website was launched by other opponents, and bars said that they would refuse entry to SantaCon participants. The New York City Parks Department refused to issue a permit for use of a local park, leading organizers to cancel plans to have SantaCon in Bushwick.

After the withdrawal from Bushwick, and opposition from the community board representing the Lower East Side and Hell's Kitchen, the 2014 event was rescheduled for 13 December for 32 bars in Midtown Manhattan. Event organizers hired Norman Siegel, a civil rights attorney, to defend their rights to express themselves "within the parameters of the First Amendment." The 2014 SantaCon coincided with demonstrations in Manhattan against police brutality sparked by the Michael Brown and Eric Garner cases.

Police arrested 5 participants and handed out 100 summonses during the 2015 SantaCon, which took place on 12 December. The summonses were for offenses that included carrying an open container, disorderly conduct, and public urination. One participant was arrested for assault, one for possession of a weapon, and three with drug possession.

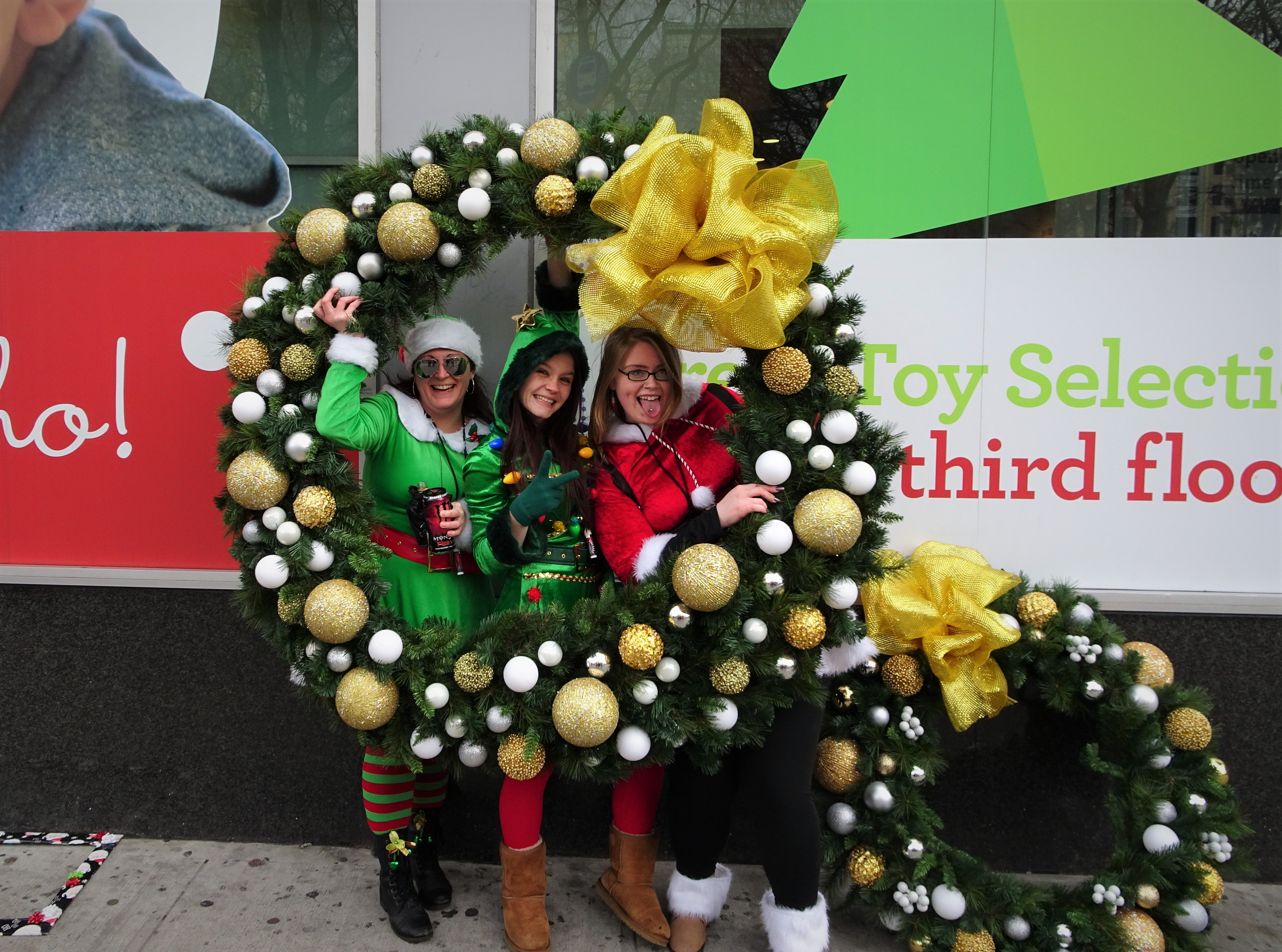
2016

In anticipation of the 2016 SantaCon, scheduled for 10 December, Metro-North Railroad banned alcohol on trains and stations. The event was scheduled to take place in Midtown Manhattan, the East Village, and the Flatiron District. A hundred summonses were handed out by police but there were no arrests. The New York Daily News reported that the pub crawl left "a trail of vomit and destruction throughout the East Village" and that one bar was robbed and vandalized by SantaCon participants.

The 2017 New York City SantaCon took place on 9 December. A stepped-up police presence and 24-hour liquor ban on Long Island Rail Road trains curbed disorder. Police reported one arrest. Two arrests and over 50 summonses were reported in 2018.

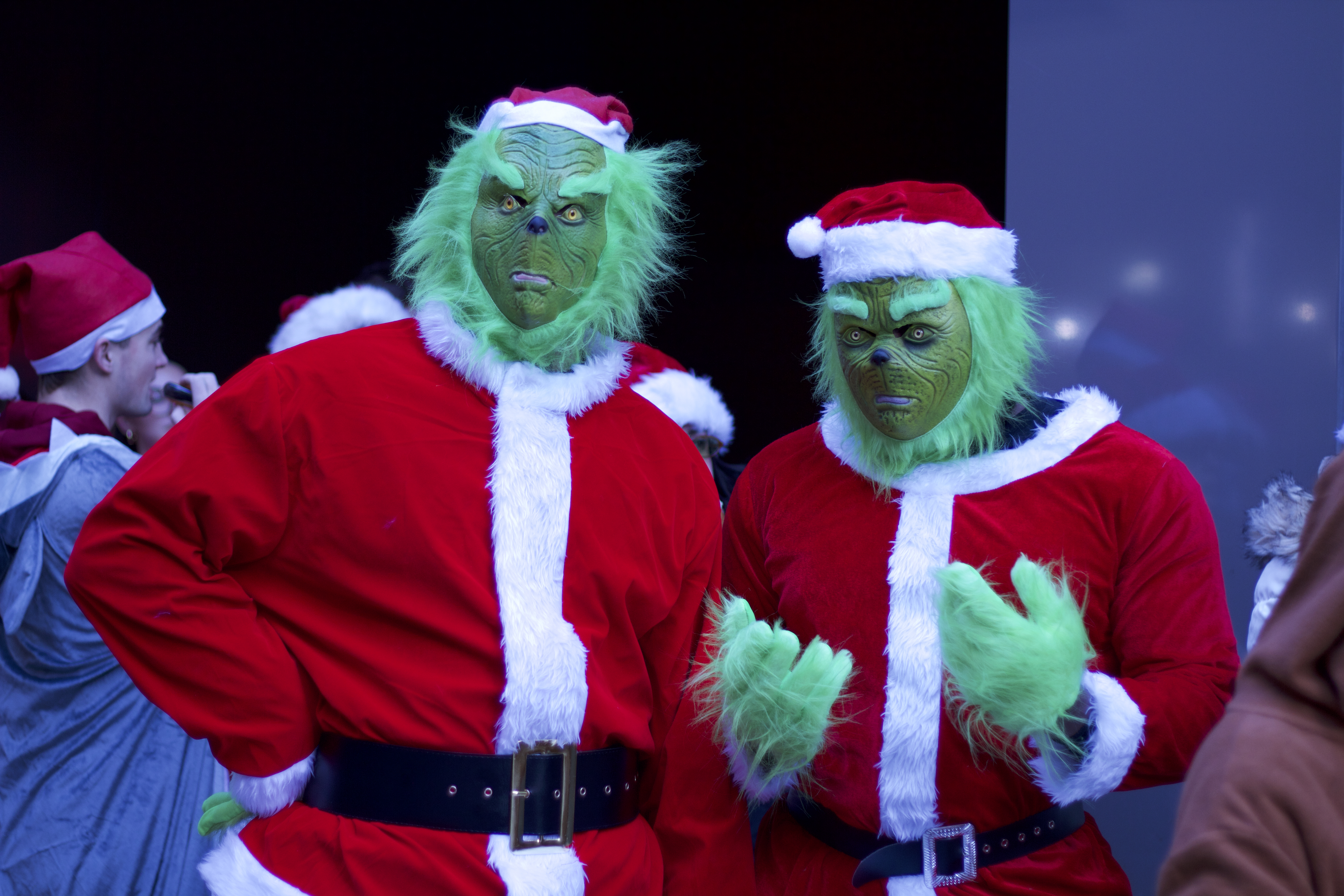
Two Grinches New York City Santacon 2024

The 2019 SantaCon was on 14 Dec. at bars in Times Square, Midtown, Chelsea and the East Village. The Long Island Railroad, Metro-North and New Jersey Transit banned alcohol on trains for the day. A citizens campaign was launched to ban future SantaCons in the city, and plans for "Santa party boats" were disapproved after three New York legislators raised concerns with the marina operator.

The New York City SantaCon website stated that there would be no officially sanctioned New York Santacon event in 2020 due to the COVID-19 pandemic. The event returned in 2021, and 2022, and the 25th annual SantaCon took place in December 2023. The 2025 SantaCon took place on Dec. 13, 2025, mostly in Midtown Manhattan and the East Village.

=== Hoboken ===
At the 2017 Santacon in Hoboken, New Jersey, 17 people were arrested and 55 taken to hospitals. In 2018, 14 were arrested, including two for aggravated assault on police officers and one for a sexual offense. Hoboken's mayor, Ravi Bhalla, said that SantaCon "remains a detriment to our city," and that Hoboken would "continue to explore ways to mitigate the impact of future 'con' events".

At the Hoboken SantaCon in 2019, eight persons were arrested, 49 summonses were issued, and there were 500 calls for assistance. Twenty persons were hospitalized for alcohol-related issues. Police Chief Ken Ferrante said the event, not sanctioned by the city, cost $75,000 in extra police manpower and said that its purported charitable purpose was a "sham."

=== Saint Paul ===
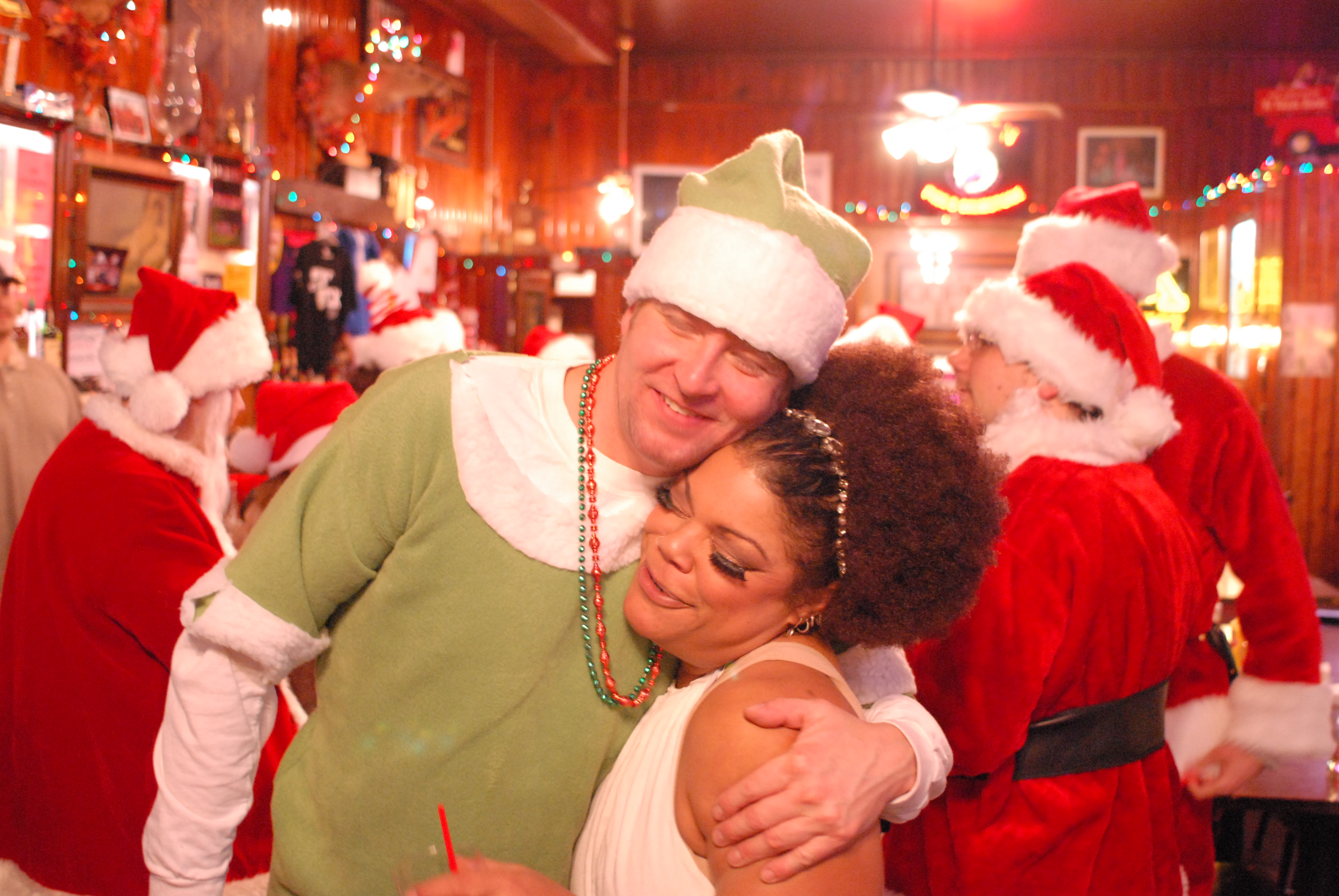
Participants at the first Lowertown SantaCon on Saturday, 20 December 2008. (Photo: Nigel Parry)

Lowertown SantaCon was first held in the Lowertown Historic District (Saint Paul, Minnesota) in 2008 and ran until 2023, organized by local artists and featuring a roving brass band playing Christmas carols for the first several years of the pub crawl, self-described as "half spectacle, half pub crawl and half flash mob—that’s one and a half things!—in the historic former arts district of Lowertown, Saint Paul, MN." Unlike the infamous New York SantaCon, this smaller event has avoided negative press, has been welcomed by the local community, and has even included a "family friendly" first stop on the route where children can meet a costumed Krampus.

=== Portland, Oregon ===
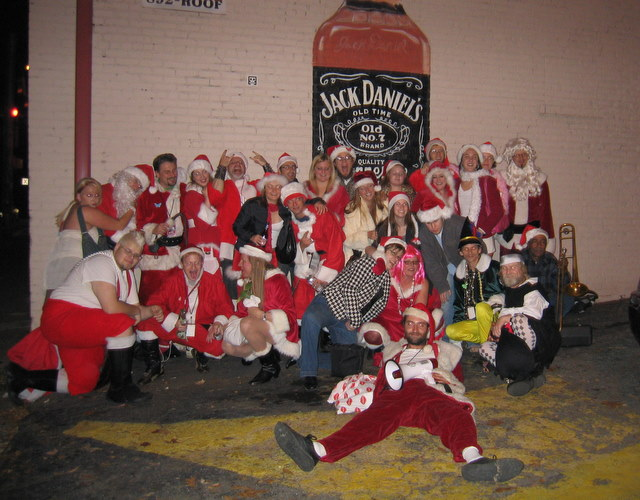
In Atlanta, 2006

In Portland, Oregon, the 2014 SantaCon was organized by the Cacophony Society, which had originated SantaCon in the city, and sought to recapture the event's roots. The Oregonian commented that "while the massively popular New York SantaCon made its own bold statement about First Amendment rights Saturday, the Portland SantaCon's statement went back to the charmingly subversive attitude that started it all."

=== San Francisco ===
In 2018, SantaCon organizers said that the city of San Francisco, where the event began, would not sanction it. The event went on despite the city's objections, concerned with safety and crowd control. No permits were issued and the crowd was thinner than in the past. The events were held there in subsequent years.

=== Portland, Maine ===
In 2008, the first SantaCon took place in Portland, Maine's Old Port district. In 2013, there were 400 participating Santas.

== Corruption allegations ==
In 2023, an analysis by the news site Gothamist found that the nonprofit organisation behind SantaCon NYC, Participatory Safety, “raised $1.4 million through SantaCon programming from late 2014 through the end of 2022,” but that “less than a fifth of that money has gone to registered nonprofits.” Gothamist found that more than a third of the organization’s total giving went to groups or individuals who appear connected to Burning Man.

In April 2026, the lead organizer of SantaCon NYC and director of Participatory Safety, Stefan Pildes, was indicted by a federal grand jury on charges of embezzling more than half of the $3 million the event raised for charity over five years. Jay Clayton, the U.S. Attorney in Manhattan, said in a statement that “Stefan Pildes promoted SantaCon as an event grounded in charitable giving, but instead of donating the millions of dollars he raised, he ran his own con game.” Pildis was charged with one count of wire fraud, and faces up to 20 years in prison if convicted.

Pildes allegedly diverted SantaCon monies to a “slush fund” to pay for "extensive renovations to a lakefront property in New Jersey, luxury vacations in Hawaii, Las Vegas, and Vail, Colorado, concert tickets, extravagant meals, and a luxury vehicle," according to federal prosecutors. The indictment charges that Pildes donated to charity "only a small fraction” of the approximately $2.7 million raised by SantaCon. and that Pildes “defrauded tens of thousands of individuals and small business owners who participated in SantaCon.”

== Documentary ==
SantaCon is the subject of a documentary by the director Seth Porges, who discovered footage of SantaCon's early years in 2021. According to The New York Times, Porges "considered himself a SantaCon hater" and felt that the event was “the absolute worst day of the year” and “the closest thing we have to a zombie apocalypse.” But he changed his mind and developed a more positive view when started watching recordings of the early gatherings in San Francisco.

The documentary debuted at Doc NYC in November 2025.

== See also ==
- Pub crawl
