= Suicide Club (secret society) =

Defunct secret society in San Francisco

- Successor: Cacophony Society
- Formation: 1977
- Purpose: Urban exploration, counterculture
- Headquarters: San Francisco, California, United States
- Official language: English
- Website: suicideclub.com

The Suicide Club was a secret society in San Francisco, which lasted from 1977–82. It is credited as the first modern extreme urban exploration society, and also known for anarchic group pranks. Despite its name, the club was not actually about suicide. Rather the club focused on people facing their fears and engaging in daring experiences.

== History ==
The club was founded by Gary Warne and three friends: Adrienne Burk, David Warren, and Nancy Prussia. The first Suicide Club event occurred on January 2, 1977 during a winter rainstorm in San Francisco, when the four founders met at Fort Point under the Golden Gate Bridge at the top of a wall facing the Pacific Ocean. Waves from the storm were crashing on the rocks below the wall, going up the wall and then crashing on to the top of the wall, soaking the chain. "The four friends took turns grabbing the chain and holding on while the freezing water hit them." After surviving the ordeal, the founders started the Suicide Club.

The club became public in Spring 1977 as a course that Warne taught at the Communiversity in San Francisco (part of the Free School Movement and formerly a part of San Francisco State University) and it lasted until shortly before Warne's death in 1983. Events generally started and ended in Warne's used paperback bookstore, Circus of the Soul, 451 Judah St near 10th Ave, shared with San Francisco Roommate Referral Service, and next to an Eckankar Center. The name of the Suicide Club was inspired by three stories written by Robert Louis Stevenson, where men who want to die belong to a club, where each evening one of them is randomly selected for death.

Warne was influenced by dadaism and surrealism. He introduced members of the group to the concept of synesthesia, and he aimed to create experiences that were fantastical and boundary-pushing. As explained by John Law, "The Suicide Club could create an other-worldly, surreal environment. Getting naked on the cable cars was a surreal experience. He wanted a disconnect with 'reality' and a connection with 'super-reality.' 'Cuz knowing you could fall off the bridge and die is a super-real feeling."

== Membership ==
The concept of membership was entirely a fiction that meant no more than participation. There was no membership list, only a mailing list. Initially, there were so-called 'initiation' events, but these had no specific nature or ceremony, they were just adventures intended to bring alive the spirit of the group in each participant. In that respect, every event served as a potential initiation for any newcomers. John Law explained, "The Suicide Club was a secret society, but it lacked any dogma that you had to adhere to (except secrecy)."

== Activities ==
Any person could propose any type of event, whether they had already participated in a previous event or not. Their writeup would be included in the Club's monthly mailer, sardonically named the "Nooseletter." There were five or so general categories that most events fell into:

- Street theater, Pranks (30 members riding the San Francisco cable cars naked and making post cards commemorating the event was perhaps the best known)
- Elaborate games in odd locales (cemeteries, sewer tunnels, and the financial district late at night are a few of the places used)
- Explorations—Urban and otherwise (abandoned industrial buildings, sewer and other tunnels, waterways, bridges, etc.)
- Infiltrations (the Unification Church and the American Nazi Party were the two most daring and involved)
- Sometimes, types of events were conjoined, such as the "infiltration" of the National Speleological Society undertaken in 1979. Club members converged on the NSS monthly confab at the Palo Alto Grotto, wanting to join. NSS members soon determined something was a bit odd about the new recruits. The two groups ended up working together on several extreme expedition caving trips, the most prominent being a two-week trip to Sótano de las Golondrinas in Central Mexico, the deepest free pit cave in the world.

== Legacy ==
The Suicide Club was probably best known at the time for its bridge climbing exploits. The Club, though secretive during its lifespan, influenced many future cultural and artistic endeavors. The Billboard Liberation Front began as a Suicide Club event hosted by Gary Warne in 1977. Author Don Herron's Dashiell Hammett Walking Tour, which would become the longest-operating literary tour in America, began in the Suicide Club in 1977. The Chinese New Years Treasure Hunt was created by Gary Warne and Rick Lasky in 1977 and continues (albeit in a different form). The Cacophony Society was founded by ex Suicide Clubbers in 1986. Members of the Cacophony Society organized San Francisco's first SantaCon, adopted later and spread throughout the world by the Cacophony Society, which has itself spread throughout the world. The Burning Man Festival was influenced by Cacophony and many former Suicide Club members were crucial organizers in the early days of the desert event. The "leave no trace" mantra of Burning Man was borrowed from the Suicide Club and the philosophy of Warne. The urban exploration exploits of the club have inspired others, such as Julia Solis to explore on their own and document their discoveries.

== Members ==
- Susan Block
- John Gilmore, co-founder of the Electronic Frontier Foundation
- John Law

== See also ==
- The Suicide Club stories by Robert Louis Stevenson
- Situationist prank
