= Larry Harvey =

American artist, co-founder of Burning Man (1948–2018)

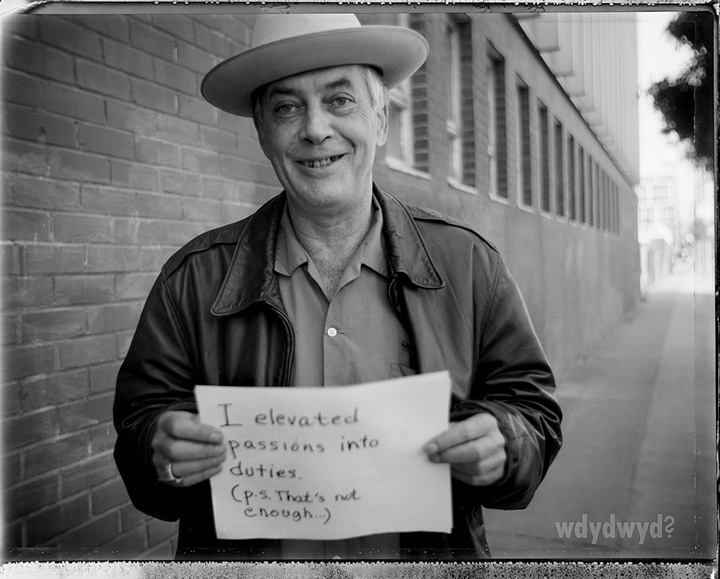
- Born: January 11, 1948; San Francisco, California, U.S.
- Died: April 28, 2018 (aged 70); San Francisco, California, U.S.
- Education: Portland State University
- Occupations: Artist, philanthropist, activist
- Years active: 1986–2018
- Known for: Co-founding Burning Man

Larry Harvey (January 11, 1948 – April 28, 2018) was an American artist, philanthropist and activist. He was the main co-founder of the Burning Man event, along with his friend Jerry James.

== Early life ==
Born in San Francisco, Harvey grew up in Portland, Oregon, where he was raised in the Parkrose neighborhood. He graduated from Parkrose High School in 1966. After high School, he joined the army and served as a clerk stationed in Germany. He later attended Portland State University.

== Burning Man ==
Burning Man started in 1986 on the evening of the summer solstice. An effigy of a man was taken to San Francisco's Baker Beach and set on fire. A small crowd gathered and soon the burning of the man became an annual event. Over the next four years the attendees grew to more than 800 people. In 1990, in collaboration with the SF Cacophony Society, the event moved to the Black Rock Desert, Nevada, and took place over Labor Day weekend. From a three-day, 80-person "zone trip," Burning Man became an eight-day counter culture event with 70,000 participants from all over the world.

In 1997, six of the main organizers formed Black Rock City LLC to manage the event, with Harvey as the executive director, a position he held until his death. Harvey was also the president of the Black Rock Arts Foundation, a non-profit art grant foundation for promoting interactive collaborative public art installations in communities outside of Black Rock City.

== Philosophy and activities ==
Larry Harvey was a voracious reader and was heavily influenced by works such as Bowling Alone: The Collapse and Revival of American Community by Robert Putnam, The Varieties of Religious Experience by William James, and the writings of Sigmund Freud.

He scripted and co-chaired/curated the Burning Man art department and its annual event theme. Harvey was the main spokesperson and political strategist for the Burning Man organization. He had been featured in such engagements as San Francisco's Grace Cathedral "Radical Ritual" with Alan Jones, the Oxford Student Union, Cooper Union in New York City, Harvard's International Conference on Internet and Society as a panelist, and the San Francisco Commonwealth Club.

== Death ==
Harvey died on April 28, 2018, due to complications related to a stroke he had suffered earlier in the same month. He was 70 years old.
