= Cacophony Society =

American counterculture organization

- Predecessor: Suicide Club
- Formation: February 9, 1986; 40 years ago
- Purpose: Counterculture activism, culture jamming, Dadaism
- Headquarters: San Francisco, California, United States
- Official language: English
- Website: cacophony.org

The Cacophony Society is a US-based organization that consists of individuals "united in the pursuit of experiences beyond the pale of mainstream society." In 1986, the organization was created by the surviving members of the defunct Suicide Club of San Francisco.

Cacophony events, which may be sponsored by any member, often involve wearing costumes, performing pranks in public places, and urban exploring.

== Chapters ==
=== San Francisco Chapter ===
Formed in 1986, some members became organizers of the annual Burning Man event. The move came after Cacophony member Michael Mikel attended the event's previous iteration, the unnamed Memorial Day beach party to raise and burn the Man on Baker Beach, in 1988 and publicized the 1989 event in the Cacophony Society newsletter.

In 1990, Carrie Galbraith and Kevin Evans conceived of Zone Trip #4 and organized it with John Law and Michael Mikel. They publicized the event in the Society newsletter as "A Bad Day at Black Rock". Larry Harvey and Jerry James, who had previously run the Baker Beach party, co-founded the Burning Man festival when they were invited to bring their effigy along for the new Labor Day weekend art festival after they had been blocked from burning it on the beach by law enforcement.

The Society was also involved in such events as the Atomic Café, the Chinese New Year Treasure Hunt, the picnic on the Golden Gate Bridge, driving an earthquake-damaged car on the closed Embarcadero Freeway to commemorate the 1989 Loma Prieta earthquake, the Brides of March, Urban Iditarod, and the Sewer Walk.

After a lull in activity in the San Francisco chapter in the late 1990s and the cessation of the chapter's monthly newsletter, Rough Draft, a group of subscribers to the defunct society's email discussion list became active under the Cacophony Society aegis. This resurgence followed a mock Pigeon Roast organized by a fictitious group called "Bay Area Rotisserie Friends" in San Francisco's Union Square in 2000, proposed by Drunken Consumptive Panda.

In 2013, Kevin Evans, Carrie Galbraith and John Law co-authored Tales of the San Francisco Cacophony Society, a book published by Last Gasp.

In 2013, a digitized collection of the San Francisco chapter's Rough Draft newsletters was uploaded to the Internet Archive.

=== Los Angeles Chapter ===
Originating in 1991, the Los Angeles chapter listed events in their monthly newsletter Tales from the Zone. After mailing out physical monthly newsletters for several years, they switched to an online newsletter format. The events produced by the Los Angeles branch often centered on public pranking with several historical events, including "Cement Cuddles" where they filled a dozen teddy bears with cement and put them on toy store shelves complete with bar-coded labels.

The Los Angeles group splintered in late 2000 when longtime leader, Al "Reverend Al" Ridenour, pranked the society itself and declared a "bold new direction" for the branch by allegedly joining an Orthodox Christian community out of guilt over the deaths of two young members who reportedly died in a drunken post-event car accident. However, one of the men eventually turned out to be completely fictitious and the other, Peter "Mr. Outer Space" Geiberger, was discovered to be alive. In Spring 2001, Ridenour stepped down as leader of the chapter.

In 2005, Reverend Al resurfaced as Dr. A.P. Ridenour, leader of a safety consciousness organization, The Art of Bleeding, along with several members of the Los Angeles chapter.

In 2008, the Los Angeles chapter was revived by San Francisco members Heathervescent and Rev. Borfo with Michael Mikel's blessing. They have since continued to sponsor events.

=== Seattle Chapter ===
In December 1993, the Seattle Chapter held a protest event called "Uncan the Cranberries" at a shopping mall, where Cacophony members asked the public to "save the free-range cranberry". Another Cacophony member asked the "adult children of parents" to avoid "dysfunction and substance abuse" by staying home and avoiding family gatherings.

=== Portland Chapter ===
By the mid-1990s, the Cacophony Society had expanded to Portland, Oregon. In 1996, Portland Cacophony organized the first Santa Rampage outside of San Francisco. The arrival of the members dressed like Santa, who flew in by plane, was met by Portland police in riot gear, following a tip-off from the San Francisco Police Department. However, the activities resulted in only two arrests, which involved a gift wrapped in a Playboy centerfold being given to a recipient without verifying that they were over 18.

For several years, Portland Cacophony was responsible for the Disgruntled Postal Workers, a group of armed individuals in postal uniforms who occasionally delivered newspapers and other forms of "mail" at the annual Burning Man festival. Eventually, the Burning Man organizers banned their guns. The Black Rock City Post Office (BRCPO), which sends US postal mail from the Burning Man festival with a unique BRCPO postmark arranged with the US Postmaster, is still managed by PDX Cacophony associates.

One of the most widely known Cacophony members is novelist Chuck Palahniuk, who has mentioned his experiences with the Society in his writings, particularly in the book Fugitives and Refugees: A Walk in Portland, Oregon. Palahniuk used the Society as the inspiration for the fictional organization Project Mayhem in his novel Fight Club. Palahniuk himself was pranked by a group of members disguised as waiters at one of his book readings in San Francisco.

=== Other Chapters ===
Cacophony chapters are or have been active in about two dozen American cities and at least a half dozen other countries. Between 2003 and 2006, and in 2008, "Sant' Arctica" was held at McMurdo Station, Antarctica.

== Other events, affiliations ==
Many activities have been inspired by the Society, such as Pee-wee Herman Day (commemorating actor Paul Reubens' arrest in a pornographic theater).

Flash mob activities have been influenced by the Society, as well as groups like Improv Everywhere. The Society also has links to the Church of the SubGenius and the annual Saint Stupid's Day Parade held on April 1 in San Francisco. Urban explorers also have taken some inspiration from early Society events such as the Sewer Walks.

== See also ==
- Counterculture
- Dadaism
- Culture jamming
- Situationist International
