= List of month-long observances =

The following is a list of notable month-long observances, recurrent months that are used by various governments, groups and organizations to raise awareness of an issue, commemorate a group or event, or celebrate something.

== January ==
- Dry January
- Veganuary (English-speaking world; originated in and headquartered in United Kingdom)
- National Mentoring Month (United States)
- Slavery and Human Trafficking Prevention Month (United States)

== February ==
- American Heart Month (United States)
- Black History Month (United States, Canada, and Germany)
- LGBT History Month (United Kingdom)
- National Bird-Feeding Month (United States)

== March ==
- Brain Tumor Awareness Month (United Kingdom)
- Irish-American Heritage Month
- Mustache March
- National Colon Cancer Awareness Month
- Women's History Month
- Youth Art Month

== April ==
- Arab American Heritage Month
- Autism Acceptance Month
- Cancer Control Month
- Confederate History Month
- Dalit History Month
- Financial Literacy Month
- Jazz Appreciation Month
- Mathematics Awareness Month
- National Child Abuse Prevention Month
- National Pet Month (United Kingdom)
- National Poetry Month
- National Poetry Writing Month
- National Volunteer Month
- Second Chance Month
- Sexual Assault Awareness Month
- Sikh Heritage Month (Canada)
- Citizen Science Month (United States)

== May ==
- ALS Awareness Month (United States)
- Asian American and Pacific Islander Heritage Month
- Borderline personality disorder awareness month
- Brain Tumor Awareness Month (excluding United Kingdom)
- Flores de Mayo (Philippines)
- Haitian Heritage Month
- International Masturbation Month
- Jewish American Heritage Month (US)
- Lyme Disease Awareness Month
- May devotions to the Blessed Virgin Mary
- Mental Health Awareness Month
- National Bike Month
- National Military Appreciation Month
- National Foster Care Month
- National Guide Dog Month (2008, 2009)
- National Pet Month (United States)
- National Smile Month (United Kingdom, May and June)
- National Stroke Awareness Month
- South Asian Heritage Month (Ontario, Canada)
- Zombie Awareness Month

== June ==
- African-American Music Appreciation Month
- ALS Awareness Month (Canada)
- Caribbean-American Heritage Month
- LGBTQ Pride Month
- National PTSD Awareness Day
- National Safety Month
- National Smile Month (United Kingdom, May and June)
- Devotion to the Sacred Heart
- National Aphasia Awareness Month
- National Dairy Month (in the United States)

== July ==
- National Ice Cream Month
- Disability Pride Month
- South Asian Heritage Month (United Kingdom; 18 July to 17 August)

== August ==
- Buwan ng Wika ("Language Month", the Philippines)
- South Asian Heritage Month (United Kingdom; 18 July to 17 August)

== September ==
- Suicide Prevention Month
- Amerindian Heritage Month (Guyana)
- Gospel Music Heritage Month
- Library Card Sign-Up Month
- National African Immigrant Heritage Month
- National Bourbon Heritage Month
- National Childhood Cancer Awareness Month
- National Guide Dog Month (US)
- National Hispanic Heritage Month (United States) (US; September 15 to October 15)
- National Honey Month
- National Preparedness Month
- National Prostate Health Month
- Pain Awareness Month

== October ==
- Black History Month (United Kingdom, Ireland, Netherlands)
- Breast Cancer Awareness Month (United States)
- Domestic Violence Awareness Month (United States)
- Filipino American History Month (United States)
- Italian-American Heritage and Culture Month (United States)
- LGBT History Month (US and Canada)
- National Arts & Humanities Month (United States)
- National Cyber Security Awareness Month (United States)
- National Disability Employment Awareness Month (United States)
- National Hispanic Heritage Month (US; September 15 to October 15)
- National Pizza Month (United States)
- National Work and Family Month (United States)
- Polish American Heritage Month
- American Archives Month (United States)

== November ==
- Academic Writing Month
- Black Catholic History Month
- COPD Awareness Month
- Indigenous Disability Awareness Month (Canada)
- Movember
- National Novel Writing Month
- Native American Indian/Alaska Native Heritage Month
- No Nut November

== December ==
- Advent – begins on the fourth Sunday before Christmas (November 27-December 3) and ends on Christmas Day (December 25).

== See also ==
- Ramadan
- List of observances in the United States by presidential proclamation
- List of awareness days
- International observance
- List of environmental dates

== Notes ==
- The first Presidential proclamation for National Caribbean American Heritage Month was June 6, 2006 by President George Bush. The first City to proclaim Caribbean Heritage Month was Washington DC in 2000. (United States)
