= October =

Tenth month in the Julian and Gregorian calendars

<<	October					>>
Su	Mo	Tu	We	Th	Fr	Sa
				1	2	3
4	5	6	7	8	9	10
11	12	13	14	15	16	17
18	19	20	21	22	23	24
25	26	27	28	29	30	31
2026

A street in Yekaterinburg (Russia), is patchily snow-covered in October

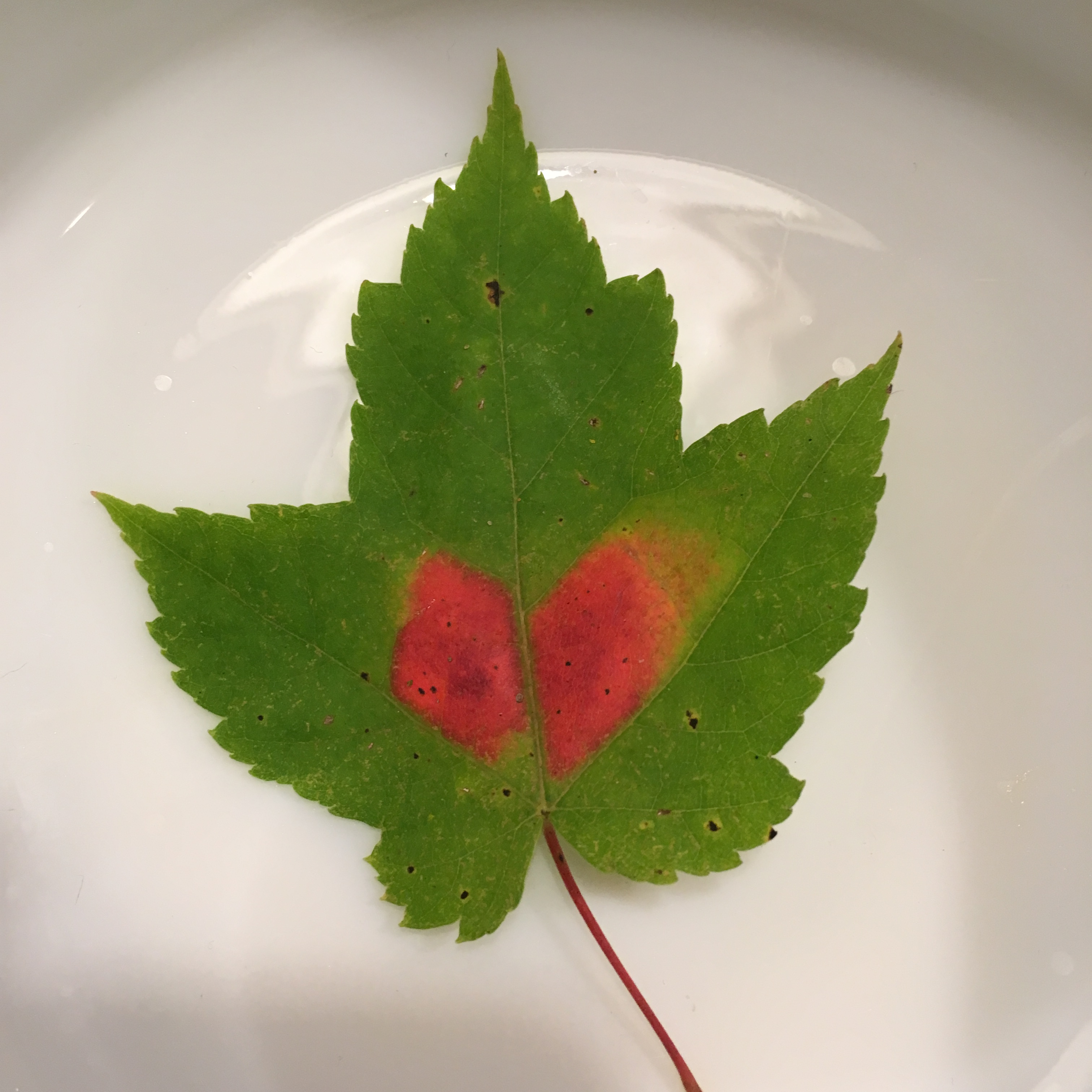
Red maple (Acer rubrum) leaf in October (Northern hemisphere).

In recent decades, the number of warm temperature records in October has outpaced cold temperature records over a growing portion of Earth's surface.

Chart shows changes in global average temperature annually in October of each year

October is the tenth month of the year in the Julian and Gregorian calendars. Its length is 31 days. The eighth month in the old calendar of Romulus c. 750 BC, October retained its name (from Latin octō meaning "eight") after January and February were inserted into the calendar that had originally been created by the Romans. In Ancient Rome, one of three Mundus patet would take place on October 5, Meditrinalia October 11, Augustalia on October 12, October Horse on October 15, and Armilustrium on October 19. These dates do not correspond to the modern Gregorian calendar. Among the Anglo-Saxons, it was known as Winterfylleth (Ƿinterfylleþ), because at this full moon, winter was supposed to begin.

October is commonly associated with the season of autumn in parts of the Northern Hemisphere, and spring in parts of the Southern Hemisphere, where it is the seasonal equivalent to April in the Northern Hemisphere and vice versa.

== Symbols ==
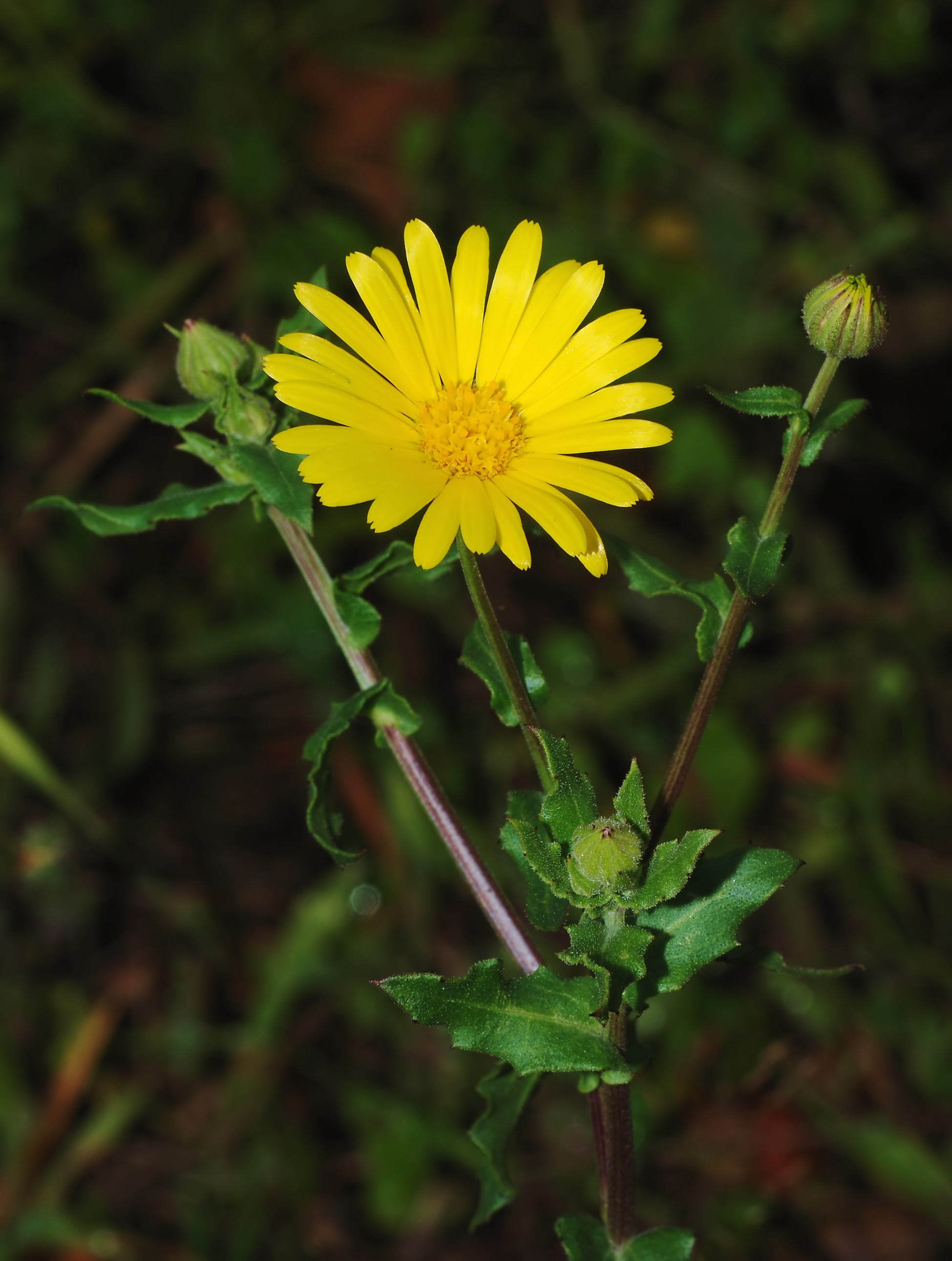
The calendula

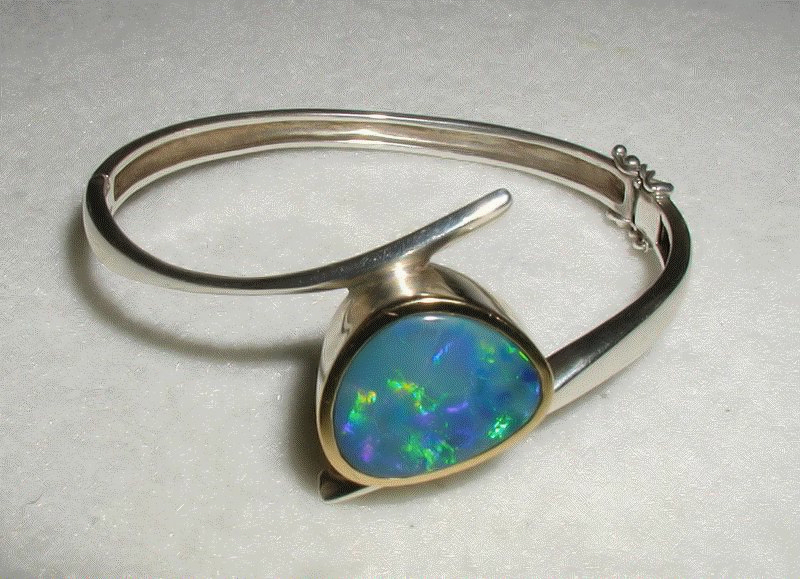
An opal armband. Opal is the birthstone for October.

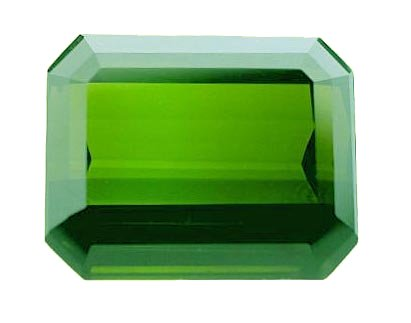
Cut tourmaline

October's birthstones are the tourmaline and opal. Its birth flower is the calendula. The zodiac signs are Libra (until October 22) and Scorpio (from October 23 onward).

== Observances ==
This list does not necessarily imply either official status or general observance.

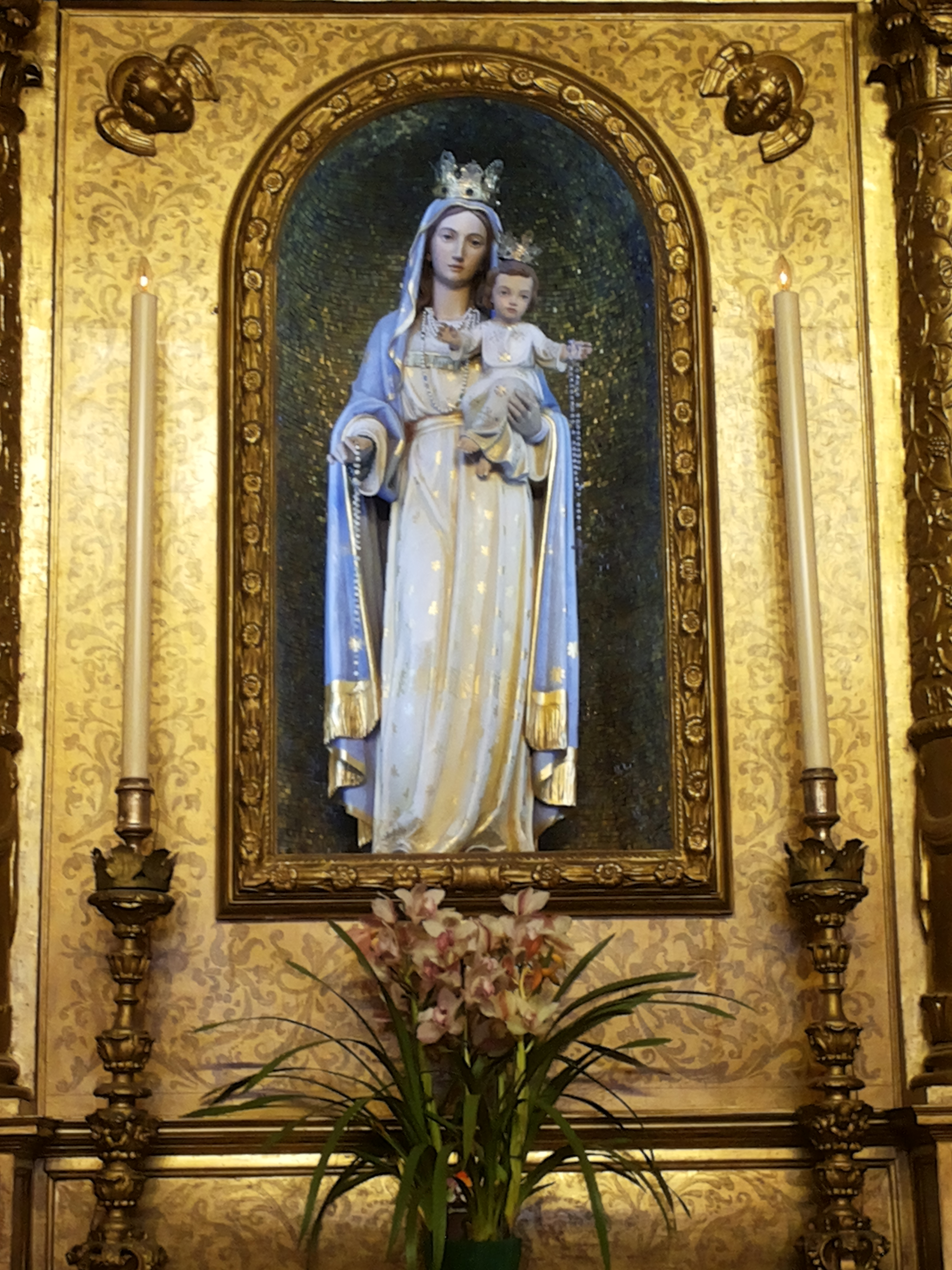
Our Lady of the Most Holy Rosary, whose devotion and Feast are celebrated in October

=== Non-Gregorian: 2026 dates ===
(All Baha'i, Islamic, and Jewish observances begin at the sundown prior to the date listed, and end at sundown of the date in question unless otherwise noted.)

- List of observances set by the Bahá'í calendar
- List of observances set by the Chinese calendar
- List of observances set by the Hebrew calendar
- List of observances set by the Islamic calendar
- List of observances set by the Solar Hijri calendar

=== Month-long ===
- Black History Month in the United Kingdom
- In Catholic Church tradition, October is the Month of the Holy Rosary.
- Breast Cancer Awareness Month
- Health Literacy Month
- International Walk to School Month
- Locktober
- Medical Ultrasound Awareness Month
- Rett Syndrome Awareness Month
- World Blindness Awareness Month
- World Menopause Month
- Vegetarian Awareness Month

==== United States ====
The last two to three weeks in October (and, occasionally, the first week of November) are normally the only time of the year during which all of the "Big Four" major professional sports leagues in the U.S. and Canada schedule games; the National Basketball Association begins its preseason and about two weeks later starts the regular season, the National Hockey League is in the first month of its regular season, the National Football League is about halfway through its regular season, and Major League Baseball is in its postseason with the League Championship Series and World Series. Days on which all four leagues play are colloquially known as a sports equinox.

- American Archives Month
- National Adopt a Shelter Dog Month
- National Arts & Humanities Month
- National Bullying Prevention Month
- National Cyber Security Awareness Month
- National Domestic Violence Awareness Month
- Filipino American History Month
- Italian-American Heritage and Culture Month
- Polish American Heritage Month
- National Work and Family Month

===== United States, health-related =====
- American Pharmacist Month
- Celebrating All of October Dwarfism/Little People/Short Stature/Skeletal Dysplasia Awareness
- Dwarfism/Little People Awareness Month
- Eczema Awareness Month
- National Dental Hygiene Month
- National Healthy Lung Month
- National Infertility Awareness Month
- Liver Awareness Month
- National Lupus Erythematosus Awareness Month
- National Physical Therapy Month
- National Spina Bifida Awareness Month
- Sudden Infant Death Syndrome Awareness Month (United States)

===== United States, culinary =====
- National Pizza Month
- National Popcorn Poppin' Month
- National Pork Month
- National Seafood Month

=== Movable dates ===
- Oktoberfest celebrations (varies globally based on area)
- Astronomy Day: October 1
- World Cerebral Palsy Day: October 6
- World College Radio Day: October 7
- Earth Science Week: October 9–15
- See also Movable Western Christian observances
- See also Movable Eastern Christian observances

==== First Sunday ====
- Daylight saving time begins (Australia)
- Father's Day (Luxembourg)
- Grandparents Day (Queensland, Australia, United Kingdom)
- Teachers' Day (Belarus, Latvia, Ukraine)

==== First Monday ====
- Child Health Day (United States)
- Children's Day (Chile, Singapore)
- Labour Day (Australian Capital Territory, New South Wales, South Australia, Queensland, Australia)
- Peat Cutting Monday (Falkland Islands)
- Thanksgiving (Saint Lucia)
- World Architecture Day
- World Habitat Day

==== First Tuesday ====
- National Night Out (Florida and Texas, United States)

==== First Wednesday ====
- Children's Day (Chile)

==== First Thursday ====
- National Poetry Day (UK, Ireland)

==== First Friday ====
- Children's Day (Singapore)
- Lee National Denim Day (United States)
- World Smile Day

==== First full week ====
- Albuquerque International Balloon Fiesta (United States)
- Mental Illness Awareness Week (United States)

==== Second Sunday ====
- National Grandparents Day (Germany, Hong Kong)

==== Second Monday ====
- Columbus Day (United States)
  - Indigenous Peoples' Day (Parts of the United States)
  - Native American Day (South Dakota, United States)
- Fraternal Day (Alabama, United States)
- Health and Sports Day (Japan)
- Mother's Day (Malawi)
- Norfolk Island Agricultural Show Day (Norfolk Island)
- Thanksgiving (Canada)
- National Day (Republic of China)

==== Second Tuesday ====
- Ada Lovelace Day

==== Second Wednesday ====
- Policy Statement of Belgian Parliament (Belgium)

==== Wednesday of second full week in October ====
- National Fossil Day (United States)

==== Second Thursday ====
- World Sight Day

==== Second Friday ====
- Arbor Day (Namibia)
- World Egg Day

==== Second Saturday ====
- International Migratory Bird Day (Mexico, Central and South America, and the Caribbean)
- Home Movie Day (International observance)
- National Tree Planting Day (Mongolia)

==== Week of October 10 ====
- Fiji Week (Fiji)

==== Second Week of October ====
- Fire Prevention Week (Canada, United States)
  - Fire Service Recognition Day (Canada), last day of Fire Prevention Week:

==== Third Sunday ====
- Teacher's Day (Brazil)
- Mother's Day (Argentina)

==== Third Monday ====
- Heroes' Day (Jamaica)
- Mother's Day (Argentina)
- Nanomonestotse (Native American communities)
- Boss's Day (United States, Canada, Lithuania and Romania)

==== Third Thursday ====
- International Credit Union Day

==== Third Saturday ====
- Sweetest Day (United States)

==== Fourth Monday ====
- Labour Day (New Zealand)

==== Fourth Wednesday ====
- Children's Day (Australia)

==== Fourth Friday ====
- Global Champagne Day

==== Fourth Saturday ====
- Children's Day (Malaysia)
- Make a Difference Day (United States)

==== Week of Fourth Wednesday ====
- Children's Week (Australia)

==== Last Monday ====
- October Holiday (Ireland)

==== Last Friday ====
- National Bandanna Day (Australia)
- Nevada Day (Nevada, United States) (though the state was actually admitted on October 31, 1864)
- Teacher's Day (Australia) (If the last Friday is on October 31, this holiday is moved to November 7)

==== Last Sunday ====
- European Summer Time ends
- Grandparents Day (New South Wales, Australia)
- Székely Autonomy Day (Romania)

=== Fixed ===
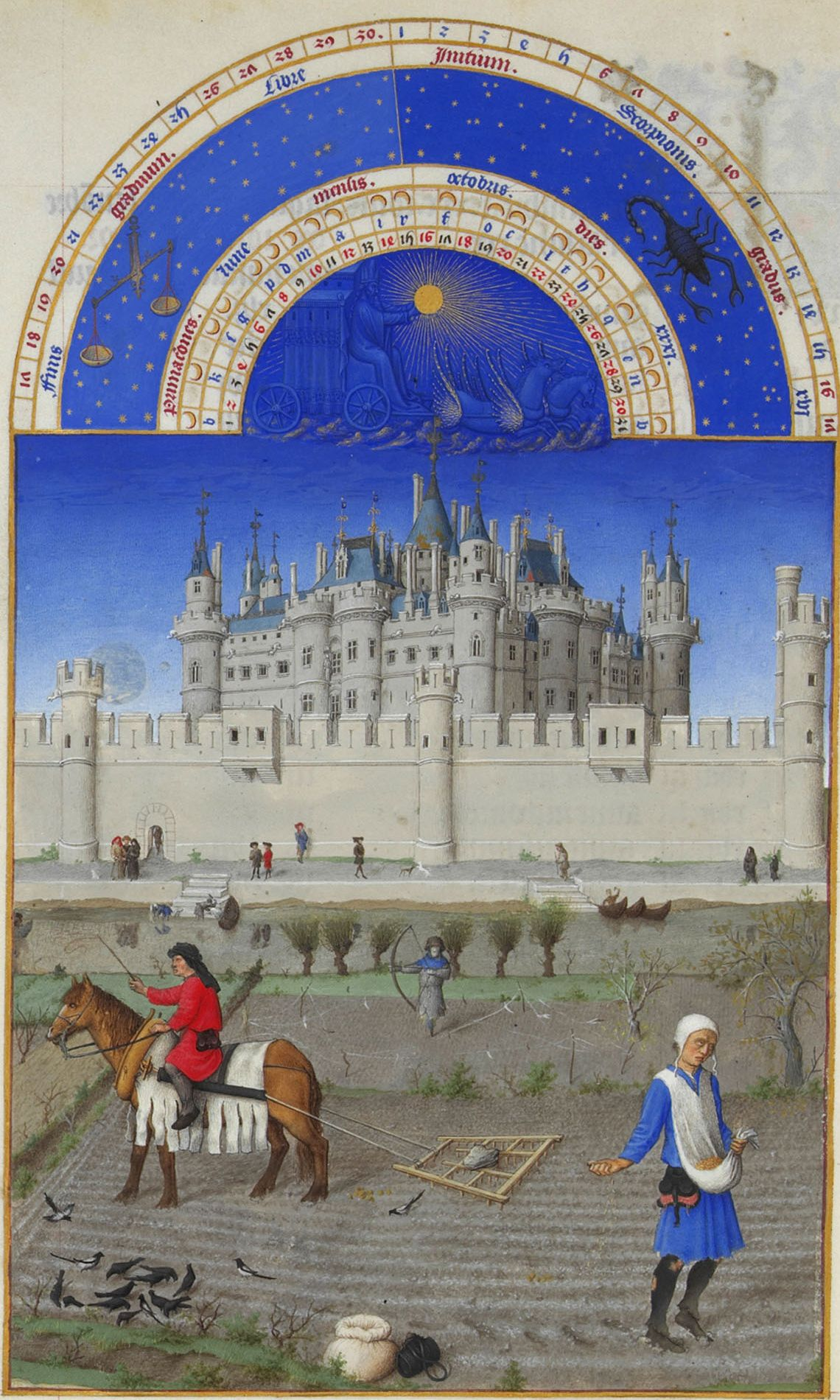
October, from the Très Riches Heures du Duc de Berry

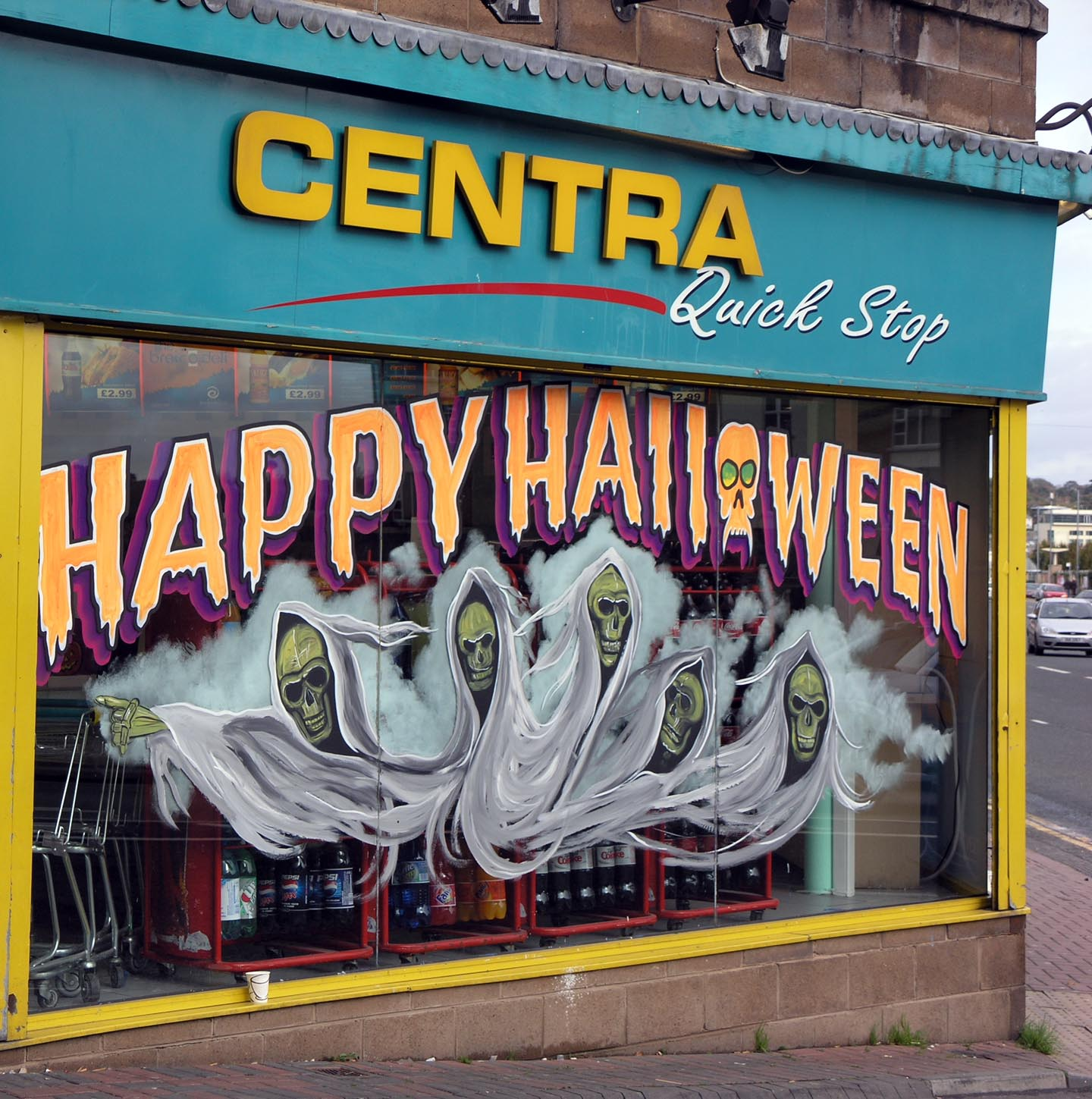
A shop in Derry decorated for Halloween

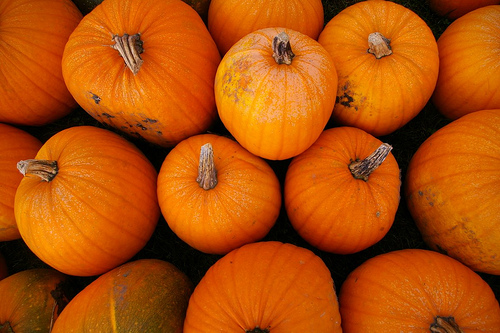
Halloween pumpkins

- October 1
  - Saint Thérèse of Lisieux, Doctor of the Church
  - Armed Forces Day (South Korea)
  - Children's Day (El Salvador, Guatemala, Sri Lanka)
  - Day of Prosecutors (Azerbaijan)
  - Continuance of German-American Heritage Months, which runs from September 15 – October 15 (United States)
  - Continuance of National Hispanic Heritage Month which runs from September 15 – October 15 (United States),
  - Ground Forces Day (Russia)
  - Independence Day (Cyprus)
  - Independence Day (Nigeria)
  - Independence Day (Palau)
  - Independence Day (Tuvalu)
  - International Coffee Day
  - International Day of Older Persons
  - International Music Day
  - Lincolnshire Day (United Kingdom)
  - National Day of the People's Republic of China (People's Republic of China)
  - Pancasila Sanctity Day (Indonesia)
  - Teacher's Day (Uzbekistan)
  - Unification Day (Cameroon)
  - World Vegetarian Day
- October 2
  - Batik Day (Indonesia)
  - Feast of the Guardian Angels
    - National Grandparents Day (Italy)
  - Gandhi's birthday-related observances:
    - Gandhi Jayanti (India)
    - International Day of Non-Violence
    - World Day for Farmed Animals
  - Independence Day (Guinea)
- October 3
  - Gaecheonjeol (South Korea)
  - German Unity Day (Germany)
  - National Day (Iraq)
  - Morazán Day (Honduras)
- October 4
  - Feast of Saint Francis of Assisi
  - Cinnamon Roll Day (Sweden)
  - Day of Peace and Reconciliation (Mozambique)
  - Independence Day (Lesotho)
  - World Animal Day
  - The beginning of World Space Week (October 4–10)
- October 5
  - Armed Forces Day (Indonesia)
  - Constitution Day (Vanuatu)
  - Engineer's Day (Bolivia)
  - International Day of No Prostitution
  - Republic Day (Portugal)
  - Teachers' Day (Pakistan)
  - Teachers' Day (Russia)
  - World Teachers' Day
- October 6
  - Day of Commemoration and National Mourning (Turkmenistan)
  - Dukla Pass Victims Day (Slovakia)
  - German-American Day (United States)
  - Memorial Day for the Martyrs of Arad (Hungary)
  - National Noodle Day (United States)
  - Teachers' Day (Sri Lanka)
  - Yom Kippur War commemorations:
    - Armed Forces Day (Egypt)
    - Tishreen Liberation Day (Syria)
- October 7
  - October 7 attacks
  - Our Lady of the Rosary
  - International Trigeminal Neuralgia Awareness Day
  - Teachers' Day (Laos)
- October 8
  - Air Force Day (India)
  - Arbor Day (Namibia)
  - National Independence Day (Croatia)
  - Navy Day (Peru)
- October 9
  - Hangul Day (South Korea)
  - Independence Day (Uganda)
  - Independence of Guayaquil (Ecuador)
  - Leif Erikson Day (United States, Iceland and Norway)
  - National Day of Commemorating the Holocaust (Romania)
  - Takayama Autumn Festival (Takayama, Japan)
  - World Post Day
  - Valencian Community Day (Spain)
- October 10
  - Arbor Day (Poland)
  - Capital Liberation Day (Vietnam)
  - Double Ten Day (Taiwan)
  - Fiji Day (Fiji)
  - Finnish Literature Day (Finland)
  - Independence Day (Cuba)
  - Party Foundation Day (North Korea)
  - World Mental Health Day
- October 11
  - General Pulaski Memorial Day (United States)
  - International Day of the Girl Child
  - International Newspaper Carrier Day
  - National Coming Out Day (multinational, including United States, United Kingdom and Switzerland among others)
  - Old Michaelmas Day (Celtic)
  - Revolution Day (North Macedonia)
- October 12
  - Children's Day (Brazil)
  - Discovery of America by Columbus-related observances (see also October 8):
    - Columbus Day (United States, Honduras)
    - Día de la Hispanidad or Fiesta Nacional de España, also Armed Forces Day (Spain)
    - Día de la Raza (El Salvador, Uruguay)
    - Día de la Resistencia Indígena, "Day of Indigenous Resistance" (Venezuela)
    - Día de las Américas (Belize)
    - Día de las Culturas, "Day of the Cultures" (Costa Rica)
    - Día del Respeto a la Diversidad Cultural, "Day of respect for cultural diversity" (Argentina)
  - Discovery Day (The Bahamas, Colombia)
  - Feast for Life of Aleister Crowley, celebrated as "Crowleymas" (Thelema)
  - Fiesta Nacional de España (Spain)
  - Freethought Day
  - Independence Day (Equatorial Guinea), celebrates the independence of Equatorial Guinea from Spain in 1968.
  - UN Spanish Language Day (United Nations)
- October 13
  - Azerbaijani Railway Day (Azerbaijan)
  - Doi taikomatsuri October 13–15 (Shikokuchūō, Ehime, Japan)
  - International Day for Natural Disaster Reduction
  - National Police Day (Thailand)
  - Paramedics' Day (Poland)
  - Rwagasore Day (Burundi)
- October 14
  - World Standards Day
- October 15
  - Breast Health Day (Europe)
  - Evacuation Day (Tunisia)
  - Global Handwashing Day
  - King Father's Commemoration Day (Cambodia)
  - National Latino AIDS Awareness Day (United States)
  - Pregnancy and Infant Loss Remembrance Day (United States and Canada)
  - Spirit Day (International observance)
  - Teachers' Day (Brazil)
  - White Cane Safety Day (United States)
- October 16
  - World Food Day
  - Pope John Paul II Day (Poland)
  - World Anaesthesia Day
- October 17
  - Dessalines Day (Haiti)
  - International Day for the Eradication of Poverty
  - Loyalty Day (Argentina)
- October 18
  - Feast of Saint Luke the Evangelist
  - Alaska Day (Alaska, United States)
  - Day of Restoration of Independence (Azerbaijan)
  - Necktie Day (Croatia)
  - Persons Day (Canada)
  - World Menopause Day
- October 19
  - Constitution Day (Niue)
  - Mother Teresa Day (Albania)
- October 20
  - Arbor Day (Czech Republic)
  - Heroes' Day (Kenya)
  - Revolution Day (Guatemala)
  - Vietnamese Women's Day (Vietnam)
  - World Osteoporosis Day
  - World Statistics Day
- October 21
  - Apple Day (United Kingdom)
  - Armed Forces Day (Honduras)
  - Egyptian Naval Day (Egypt)
  - Indian Police Commemoration Day (India)
  - International Day of the Nacho
  - National Nurses' Day (Thailand)
  - Ndadaye Day (Burundi)
  - Overseas Chinese Day (Taiwan)
  - Trafalgar Day (the British Empire in the 19th and early 20th century)
- October 22
  - Fechner Day (International observance)
  - International Caps Lock Day
  - International Stuttering Awareness Day
  - Jidai Matsuri (Kyoto, Japan)
  - National Santri Day (Indonesia)
  - Wombat Day (Australia)
- October 23
  - Aviator's Day (Brazil)
  - Chulalongkorn Day (Thailand)
  - Day of the Macedonian Revolutionary Struggle (North Macedonia)
  - Liberation Day (Libya)
  - Mole Day (International observance)
  - National Day (Hungary)
  - Paris Peace Agreement Day (Cambodia)
- October 24
  - Azad Kashmir Day (Pakistan)
  - Day of Special Forces of the Armed Forces (Russia)
  - Food Day (United States)
  - Independence Day (Zambia)
  - Suez Day (Egypt)
  - United Nations Day (International observance)
  - World Development Information Day
  - World Polio Day
- October 25
  - Armed Forces Day (Romania)
  - Constitution Day (Lithuania)
  - Customs Officer's Day (Russia)
  - Day of the Basque Country (Basque Country)
  - Retrocession Day (Taiwan)
  - Sovereignty Day (Slovenia)
  - Thanksgiving Day (Grenada)
  - The Hallowing of Nestorius (Nestorian Christianity)
- October 26
  - Accession Day (Jammu and Kashmir)
  - Angam Day (Nauru)
  - Armed Forces Day (Benin)
  - Intersex Awareness Day (International observance)
  - National Day (Austria)
- October 27
  - Black Cat Appreciation Day (United Kingdom)
  - Černová Tragedy Day (Slovakia)
  - Flag Day (Greece)
  - Independence Day (Saint Vincent and the Grenadines)
  - Navy Day (United States) (unofficial, official date is October 13)
  - World Day for Audiovisual Heritage
- October 28
  - Day of the Establishment of an Independent Czecho-Slovak State (Czech Republic and Slovakia)
  - International Animation Day
  - Ohi Day (Greece, Cyprus)
  - Prefectural Earthquake Disaster Prevention Day (Gifu Prefecture, Japan)
  - Youth Pledge Day (Indonesia)
- October 29
  - Coronation Day (Cambodia)
  - Cyrus the Great Day (Iran)
  - National Cat Day (United States)
  - Republic Day (Turkey)
  - World Stroke Day
- October 30
  - Anniversary of the Declaration of the Slovak Nation (Slovakia)
  - Day of Remembrance of the Victims of Political Repressions (former Soviet republics, except Ukraine)
  - Indonesian Banknote Day (Indonesia)
  - International Orthopaedic Nurses Day
  - Mischief Night (United States and Canada)
    - Beggars Night (certain regions of the United States)
    - Devil's Night (Michigan, United States)
  - Thevar Jayanthi (Thevar community, India)
- October 31
  - Start of Allhallowtide October 31 – November 6
  - The first day of the Day of the Dead, celebrated until November 2 (Mexico)
  - Día de la Canción Criolla (Peru)
  - Eve of Winter, the eve of the first day of winter in the Northern hemisphere:
    - Allantide (Cornwall, United Kingdom)
    - Halloween (English-speaking countries, also in other locations)
    - Hop-tu-Naa (Isle of Man)
    - Samhain in the Northern Hemisphere, Beltane in the Southern Hemisphere; begins on sunset of October 31 (Gaels, Welsh people and Neopagan Wheel of the Year)
  - Girl Scouts Founders Day (United States)
  - King Father's Birthday (Cambodia)
  - National Unity Day (India)
  - Reformation Day (Slovenia, parts of Germany, Chile, El Salvador, Dominican Republic, Evangelical Churches and Lutheran Churches)
  - Saci day (Brazil)
  - World Savings Day
  - Statehood Day Nevada, United States

== Miscellaneous ==
- Eric Whitacre composed a piece based on this month, titled October.
- Neil Gaiman wrote a story personifying the month, titled "October in the Chair", for his 2006 collection Fragile Things.
- Ray Bradbury published a collection of short stories titled The October Country in 1955.
- The song October doth before us go celebrates the progression of spring (from the perspective of the Southern Hemisphere).
