= Commemorative month =

Month-long observance

A commemorative month, also in some instances known as a heritage month or a history month, is a month-long observance designated to recognize and celebrate various aspects of cultural, historical, and social significance, in particular, in commemoration of historically marginalized minorities. It originated in the US and is still mainly practiced there and in Canada, with such months institutionalized on government level and observed by many private institutions, such as schools and universities.

== History ==
The first commemorative month was the US Black History Month, which first was commemorated at Kent State University from January 2 to February 28, 1970, and recognized by President Gerald Ford in 1976, during the celebration of the United States Bicentennial. The observance had begun at a smaller scale in 1926 as "Negro History Week". It took until 1986 before another commemorative month, Women's History Month, in March, was recognized on state level in the US. The third such month was Asian American and Pacific Islander Heritage Month, recognized in 1992.

== Outside of North America ==
Black History Month is celebrated in October in the United Kingdom, Ireland and Germany.

== See also ==
- List of month-long observances
