= Black History Month =

Annual celebration of Black history

- Also called: African-American History Month
- Observed by: United States, Canada, Ireland, United Kingdom, Jamaica
- Significance: Celebration of the African diaspora including, African-American history
- Date: February (US, Canada and Jamaica); October (Europe)
- Duration: 1 month
- Frequency: Annual

Black History Month is an annually observed commemorative month originating in the United States, where it is also known as African-American History Month. It began as a way of remembering important people and events in African-American history, before it spread to other countries where it could celebrate black people worldwide. It initially lasted a week before becoming a month-long observation since 1970. It is celebrated in February in the United States and Canada, where it has received official recognition from governments, and more recently has also been celebrated in Ireland and the United Kingdom where it is observed in October.

== Origin ==
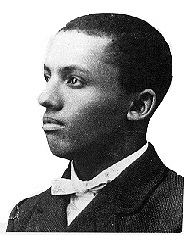
Carter G. Woodson, who is credited with the creation of Negro History Week in 1926, the precursor to what evolved into Black History Month

=== Negro History Week (1926) ===
The precursor to Black History Month was created in 1926 in the United States, when historian Carter G. Woodson and the Association for the Study of Negro Life and History (ASNLH) announced the second week of February to be "Negro History Week". This week was chosen because it coincided with the birthday of Abraham Lincoln on February 12 and that of Frederick Douglass on February 14, both of which Black communities had celebrated since the late 19th century. For example, in January 1897, school teacher Mary Church Terrell persuaded the Washington, D.C. school board to set aside the afternoon of Douglass's birthday as Douglass Day to teach about his life and work in the city's segregated public schools. The thought process behind the week was never recorded, but scholars acknowledge two reasons for its birth: recognition and importance. In 1915, Woodson had participated in the Lincoln Jubilee, a celebration of the 50 years since emancipation from slavery held in Bronzeville, Chicago. The summer-long Jubilee, which drew thousands of attendees from across the country to see exhibitions of heritage and culture, impressed Woodson with the need to draw organized focus to the history of black people. He led the founding of the ASNLH in Chicago that fall, toward the end of the Jubilee.

Early in the event's history, African-American newspapers lent crucial support. From the event's initial phase, primary emphasis was placed on encouraging the coordinated teaching of the history of Black Americans in the nation's public schools. The first Negro History Week was met with a lukewarm response, gaining the cooperation of the departments of education of the states of North Carolina, Delaware, and West Virginia as well as the city school administrations of Baltimore, New York City, Philadelphia, and Washington, D.C. Despite this limited observance, Woodson regarded the event as "one of the most fortunate steps ever taken by the Association", and plans for an annual repeat of the event continued.

At the time of Negro History Week's launch, Woodson contended that the teaching of Black History was essential to ensure the physical and intellectual survival of Blacks within broader society:

If a race has no history, it has no worthwhile tradition, it becomes a negligible factor in the thought of the world, and it stands in danger of being exterminated. The American Indian left no continuous record. He did not appreciate the value of tradition; and where is he today? The Hebrew keenly appreciated the value of tradition, as is attested by the Bible itself. In spite of worldwide persecution, therefore, he is a great factor in our civilization.

In 1929, The Journal of Negro History noted that, with only two exceptions, officials with the state departments of education of "every state with considerable Negro population" had made the event known to that state's teachers and distributed official literature associated with the event. Churches also played a significant role in the distribution of literature in association with Negro History Week during this initial period, with the mainstream and Black press aiding in the publicity effort.

Throughout the 1930s, Negro History Week countered the growing myth of the South's "lost cause", which argued that enslaved people had been well-treated, that the Civil War was a war of "northern aggression", and that Black people had been better off under slavery. Woodson wrote, "When you control a man's thinking you do not have to worry about his actions, you do not have to tell him not to stand here or go yonder. He will find his 'proper place' and will stay in it."

Negro History Week grew in popularity throughout the following decades, with mayors across the United States endorsing it as a holiday.

=== Black History Month (1970) ===
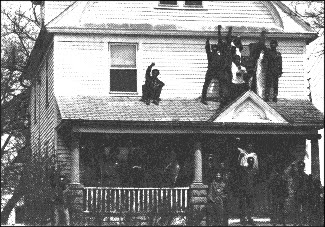
The Black United Students' first Black culture center, Kuumba House in Kent State University, where many events of the first Black History Month celebration took place

Black educators and Black United Students at Kent State University first proposed Black History Month in February 1969. The first celebration of Black History Month took place at Kent State a year later, from January 2 to February 28, 1970.

Six years later, Black History Month was being celebrated all across the country in educational institutions, centers of Black culture, and community centers, both great and small, when President Gerald Ford recognized Black History Month in 1976, during the celebration of the United States Bicentennial. He urged Americans to "seize the opportunity to honor the too-often neglected accomplishments of Black Americans in every area of endeavor throughout our history".

== Observance by region ==
=== United States ===
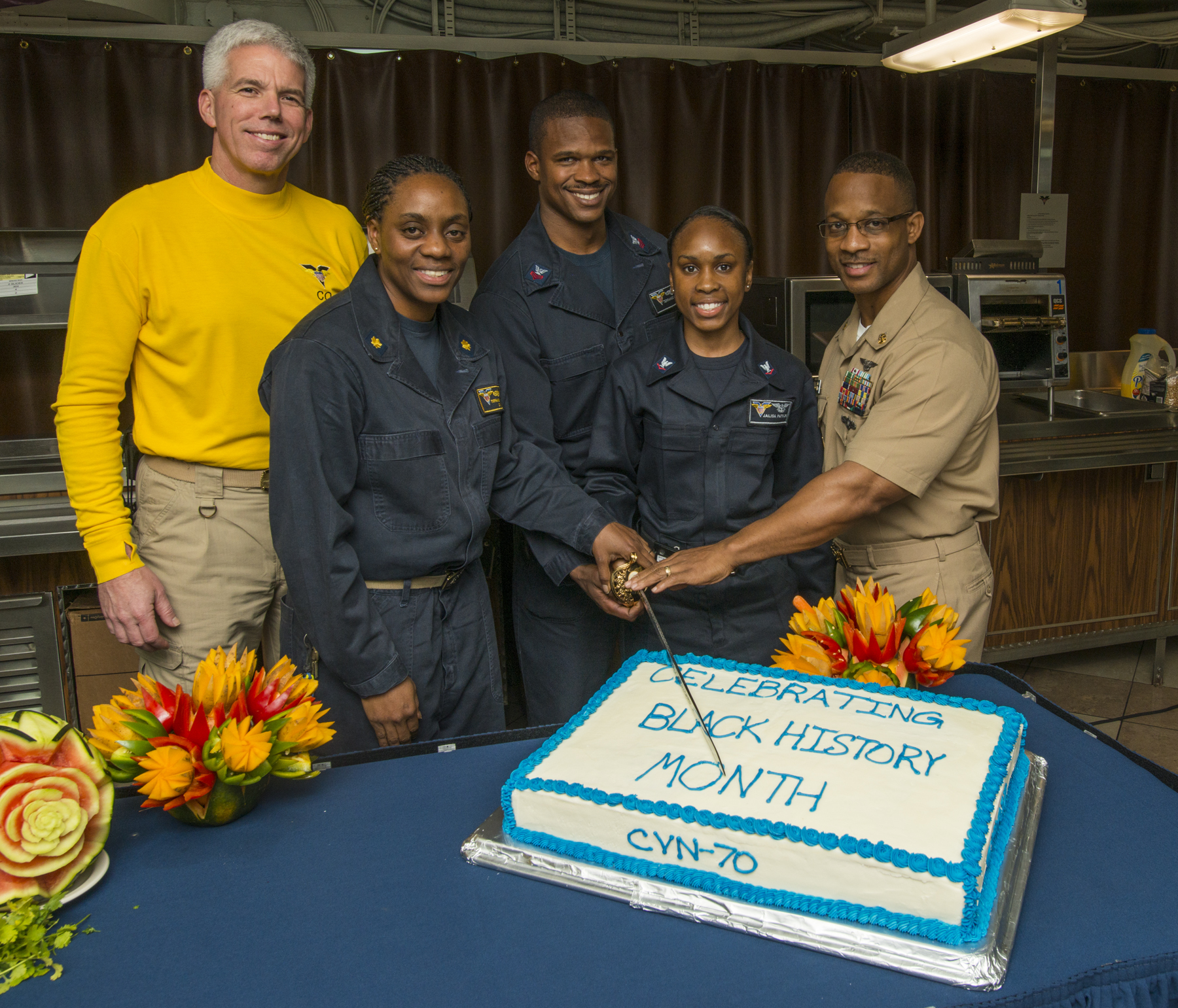
Black History Month on the USS Carl Vinson (CVN-70) deployed in February 2015 in the 5th Fleet area of operations supporting Operation Inherent Resolve, strike operations in Iraq and Syria. Photo removed online by the Trump administration in 2025.

In the United States, Black History Month is commemorated during the month of February. Since its inception, the Black community met the creation of Black History Month with enthusiastic response; it prompted the creation of Black history clubs, an increase in interest among teachers, and interest from progressive whites. Black History Month has also expanded beyond its initial acceptance in educational establishments. Carter Woodson's organization, now known as the Association for the Study of African American Life and History (ASALH), designates a theme each year. For example, "Black Health and Wellness" in 2022 focused on medical scholars, health care providers, and health outcomes. The Wall Street Journal describes Black History Month as "a time when the culture and contributions of African Americans take center stage" in a variety of cultural institutions, including theaters, libraries, and museums.

Black History Month has garnered attention from the U.S. business community. In 2018, Instagram created its first Black History Month program with the help of its Head of Global Music & Youth Culture Communications, SHAVONE. Instagram's Black History Month program featured a series of first-time initiatives, including a #BlackGirlMagic partnership with Spotify and the launch of the #CelebrateBlackCreatives program, which reached more than 19 million followers. In February 2020, many American corporations commemorated Black History Month, including The Coca-Cola Company, Google, Target Corporation, Macy's, United Parcel Service and Under Armour.

On February 18, 2016, 106-year Washington, D.C., resident and school volunteer Virginia McLaurin visited the White House as part of Black History Month. When asked by President Barack Obama why she was there, McLaurin said: "A Black president. A Black wife. And I'm here to celebrate Black history. That's what I'm here for."

In 2025, the Defense Intelligence Agency cancelled internal celebrations of Black History Month and other "special observances" due to the second Trump administration's efforts to stop diversity, equity, and inclusion initiatives. However, at the start of February, President Donald Trump signed a proclamation honoring National Black History Month. One year later on February 18, Trump hosted a celebration for the 100th anniversary of Black History Month at the White House, to varying responses across media outlets. The event followed backlash over a racist video he posted on Truth Social which depicted Barack and Michelle Obama as primates.

=== United Kingdom ===
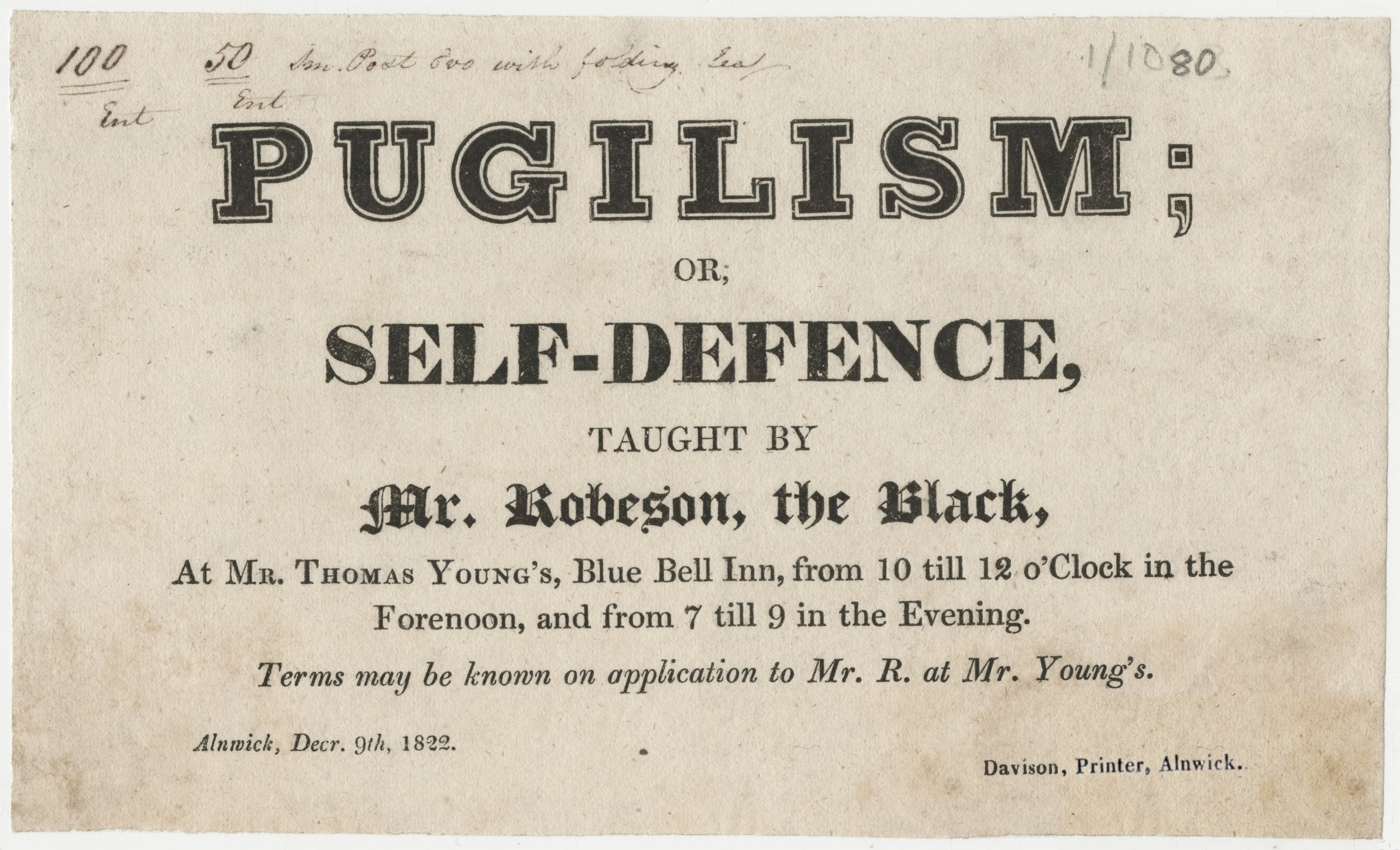
1822 handbill advertising a Black boxing tutor in Alnwick, Northumberland; tweeted by Northumberland Archives as part of Black History Month in 2020

In the United Kingdom, Black History Month was first celebrated in October 1987 The year of 1987, recognized as the African Jubilee, was coincidentally the year of the 150th anniversary of Caribbean emancipation, the centenary of the birth of Marcus Garvey and the 25th anniversary of the Organization of African Unity, an institution dedicated to advancing the progress of African states. Black History Month in the UK was organised through the leadership of Ghanaian analyst Akyaaba Addai-Sebo, who had served as a coordinator of special projects for the Greater London Council (GLC) and created a collaboration to get it underway. The first Black History Month celebration in the UK was held in London on October 1, 1987, when Dr. Maulana Karenga from the US was invited to an event by the Greater London Council about Black people's contributions to history.

Some institutions have faced criticism for supporting Black History Month with images of people from British Asian backgrounds, using the term "black" to refer to political blackness encompassing all people of color.

A range of organisations including universities, local authorities, national institutes, charities, international NGOs, museums and libraries recognise Black History Month, and some take part in planning and running events.

In Scotland, the Coalition for Racial Equality and Rights leads co-ordination of the programme of events for Black History Month. BHM Scotland have published a range of resources, including a policy briefing.

Black History Month has been marked in the House of Commons with debate since 2020, when multiple e-petitions to Parliament were taken up.

=== Germany ===
In Berlin, Germany, in 1990, members of the Black German community began observing Black History Month. Programs have included discussions of black Europeans, international African perspectives, the history of civil rights in the U.S., and apartheid in South Africa.

=== Canada ===
In 1995, after a motion by politician Jean Augustine, representing the riding of Etobicoke—Lakeshore in Ontario, Canada's House of Commons officially recognized February as Black History Month (French: Mois de l'histoire des Noirs) and honored Black Canadians. In 2008, Senator Donald Oliver moved to have the Senate officially recognize Black History Month, which was unanimously approved.

Black History Month was first proclaimed by the City of Toronto in 1979, and then by the Province of Ontario in 1993. Work done by the Ontario Black History Society helped lead to these proclamations.

Canada defines the festivity as an opportunity to celebrate "the achievements and contributions of Black Canadians and their communities who … have done so much to make Canada a culturally diverse, compassionate, and prosperous country".

=== Jamaica ===
In Jamaica, Black History Month is observed during the month of February, which had been informally adopted by the mid-1990s. Special attention is given to this period as February also marks Reggae Month, which coincides with the birthdates of the King of Reggae, Robert Nesta Marley OM, and the Prince of Reggae, Dennis Brown. It has been a time to acknowledge and honour the achievements and inventions of black figures throughout history, and to reflect on liberation, past racial adversity and struggles. During this period, locals especially reflect on and pay homage to the contributions of prominent African American civil rights activists, and Jamaican activists and pioneers who have been impactful internationally and nationally— such as Marcus Garvey, Bob Marley, Peter Tosh, Harry Belafonte, Ferdinand Smith, John Brown Russwurm, and others. Reggae's role in global social and political activism against apartheid, oppression and inequality, has amplified the significance of Black History Month on the island. Since January 9, 2008, February has been officially declared as Reggae Month, which also celebrates the genre's musical, cultural and economic contributions to the development of the island.

In the past, some critics questioned the rationale and relevance of commemorating an "imported" event to Jamaican contexts— in light of differences in demographics and experiences between the United States and Jamaica, and Jamaicans' penchant of adopting anything emanating from the United States. Others argued for greater attention to local heroes, while demonstrating solidarity with Black Americans.

=== Republic of Ireland ===
Ireland's Great Hunger Institute, at Quinnipiac University in Connecticut, notes: "Black History Month Ireland was initiated in Cork in 2010. This location seems particularly appropriate as, in the 19th century, the city was a leading center of abolition, and the male and female anti-slavery societies welcomed several black abolitionists to lecture there, including Charles Lenox Remond and Frederick Douglass."

=== France ===
In France, at the initiative of Karfa Diallo's association, the Black History Month was first organized in 2018 in Bordeaux. Since then, there have been celebrations in Paris, Le Havre, Guadeloupe, La Rochelle and Bayonne. In 2022 the month was dedicated to Josephine Baker, a dancer and member of the French Resistance during World War II born in the United States.

=== Africa ===
In 2020, Black History Month was celebrated in seven African countries (Benin, Burkina Faso, Chad, Ivory Coast, Comoros, Senegal and Cameroon) for the first time. The event was initiated by the organisation Africa Mondo founded by Mélina Seymour. Starting in 2021, an African History Month was celebrated in March.

== Developments ==
When first established, Black History Month resulted in some controversy. Those who believed that Black History Month was limited to educational institutions questioned whether it was appropriate to confine the celebration of Black history to one month, as opposed to the integration of Black history into mainstream education for the whole year.

Another concern was that, contrary to the original inspiration for Black History Month, which was a desire to redress how American schools failed to represent Black historical figures as anything other than enslaved people or colonial subjects, Black History Month could reduce complex historical figures to overly simplified objects of "hero worship".

Other critics refer to the celebration as a form of racism. Actor and director Morgan Freeman and actress Stacey Dash have criticized the concept of declaring only one month as Black History Month. Freeman noted, "I don't want a Black history month. Black history is American history."

In February 2025, Google announced that Black History Month would no longer be highlighted by default on Google Calendar, arguing that it was no longer "scalable or sustainable" to continue adding the growing number of national and international "cultural moments" manually to its calendars.

== Themes ==
In the US, a theme for each Black History Month is selected by the ASALH:

- 1928: Civilization: A World Achievement
- 1929: Possibility of Putting Negro History in the Curriculum
- 1930: Significant Achievements of the Negro
- 1931: Neglected Aspects of Negro History
- 1932: What George Washington Bicentennial Commission Fail to Do
- 1933: Ethiopia Meets Error in Truth
- 1934: Contribution of the Negro in Poetry, in Painting, in Sculpture and in Science
- 1935: The Negro Achievements in Africa
- 1936: African Background Outlined
- 1937: American Negro History from the Time of Importation from Africa up to the Present Day
- 1938: Special Achievements of the Race: Oratory, Drama, Music, Painting, Sculpture, Science and Inventions
- 1939: Special Achievements of the Race: Religion, Education, Business, Architecture, Engineering, Innovation, Pioneering
- 1940: Negro Labor
- 1941: The Career of Frederick Douglass
- 1942: The Negro in Democracy
- 1943: The Negro in the Modern World
- 1944: The Negro and the New Order
- 1945: The Negro and Reconversion
- 1946: Let us Have Peace
- 1947: Democracy Possible only Through Brotherhood
- 1948: The Whole Truth and Nothing but the Truth
- 1949: The Use of Spirituals in the Classroom
- 1950: Outstanding Moments in Negro History
- 1951: Eminent Negroes in World Affairs
- 1952: Great Negro Educators (Teachers)
- 1953: Negro History and Human Relations
- 1954: Negro History: A Foundation for Integration
- 1955: Negro History: A Contribution to America's Intercultural Life
- 1956: Negro History in an Era of Changing Human Relations
- 1957: Negro History
- 1958: Negro History: A Factor in Nationalism and Internationalism
- 1959: Negro History: A Foundation for a Proud America
- 1960: Strengthening America Through Education in Negro History and African Culture
- 1961: Freedom and Democracy for the Negro after 100 years (1861–1961)
- 1962: Negro History and a New Birth of Freedom
- 1963: Negro History Evaluates Emancipation (1863–1963)
- 1964: Negro History: A Basis for the New Freedom
- 1965: Negro History: Freedom's Foundation
- 1966: Freedom from Racial Myths and Stereotypes Through Negro History
- 1967: Negro History in the Home, School, and the Community
- 1968: The Centennial of the Fourteenth Amendment Afro American History Week
- 1969: Changing the Afro American Image through History
- 1970: 15th Amendment and Black America in the Century (1870–1970)
- 1971: African Civilization and Culture: A Worthy Historical Background
- 1972: African Art, Music, Literature; a Valuable Cultural Experience
- 1973: Biography Illuminates the Black Experience
- 1974: Helping America Understand
- 1975: Fulfilling America's Promise: Black History Month
- 1976: America for All Americans
- 1977: Heritage Days: The Black Perspective; the Third Century
- 1978: Roots, Achievements and Projections
- 1979: History: Torch for the future
- 1980: Heritage for America
- 1981: Black History: Role Model for Youth
- 1982: Afro American Survival
- 1983: Afro Americans in the United States
- 1984: Afro Americans and Education
- 1985: Afro American Family
- 1986: Afro American Experience: International Connection
- 1987: Afro Americans and the Constitution from Colonial Times to the Present
- 1988: Constitutional Status of Afro Americans in the 21st Century
- 1989: Afro Americans and Religion
- 1990: Seventy-Five Years of Scholarly Excellence: A Homage to Our Forebearers
- 1991: Educating America: Black Universities and Colleges, Strengths and Crisis
- 1992: African Roots Experience New Worlds, Pre-Columbus to Space Exploration
- 1993: Afro-American Scholars: Leaders, Activists and Writers
- 1994: Empowering Black Americans
- 1995: Reflections on 1895: Douglass, Du Bois & Washington
- 1996: Black Women
- 1997: African Americans and Civil Rights; a Reprisal
- 1998: Black Business
- 1999: Legacy of African American Leadership for the Present and the Future
- 2000: Heritage and Horizons: The African American Legacy and the Challenges for the 21st Century
- 2001: Creating and Defining the African American Community: Family, Church Politics and Culture
- 2002: The Color Line Revisited: Is Racism Dead?
- 2003: The Souls of Black Folks: Centennial Reflections
- 2004: Before Brown, Beyond Boundaries: Commemorating the 50th Anniversary of Brown v. Board of Education
- 2005: The Niagara Movement: Black Protest Reborn, 1905–2005
- 2006: Celebrating Community: A Tribute to Black Fraternal, Social, and Civil Institutions
- 2007: From Slavery to Freedom: Africans in the Americas
- 2008: Carter G. Woodson and the Origins of Multiculturalism
- 2009: The Quest for Black Citizenship in the Americas
- 2010: The History of Black Economic Empowerment
- 2011: African Americans and the Civil War
- 2012: Black Women in American Culture and History
- 2012: President Barack Obama National Black History Month Proclamation
- 2013: At the Crossroads of Freedom and Equality: The Emancipation Proclamation and the March on Washington
- 2014: Civil Rights in America
- 2015: A Century of Black Life, History, and Culture
- 2016: Hallowed Grounds: Sites of African American Memories
- 2017: The Crisis in Black Education
- 2018: African Americans in Times of War
- 2019: Black Migrations
- 2020: African Americans and the Vote
- 2021: The Black Family: Representation, Identity, and Diversity
- 2022: Black Health and Wellness
- 2023: Black Resistance
- 2024: African Americans and the Arts
- 2025: African Americans and Labor
- 2026: A Century of Black History Commemorations

== See also ==
- African-American history
- African-American Heritage Sites
- African-American Music Appreciation Month

=== Other history months ===
- Filipino American History Month
- LGBT History Month
- Women's History Month
- Disability History Month
- Dalit History Month

=== Heritage months ===
- Arab American Heritage Month
- Gay and Lesbian Pride Month
- Irish-American Heritage Month
- Italian-American Heritage and Culture Month
- Jewish American Heritage Month
- National Hispanic Heritage Month
- National Tibetan American Heritage Month
- Native American Indian Heritage Month
- Polish American Heritage Month
- Puerto Rican Heritage Month
- South Asian Heritage Month
- Asian Pacific American Heritage Month
- Haitian Heritage Month

=== International ===
- Afro-Colombian Day
- Black Awareness Day, Brazil
