= National Brain Tumor Society =

U.S. nonprofit organization

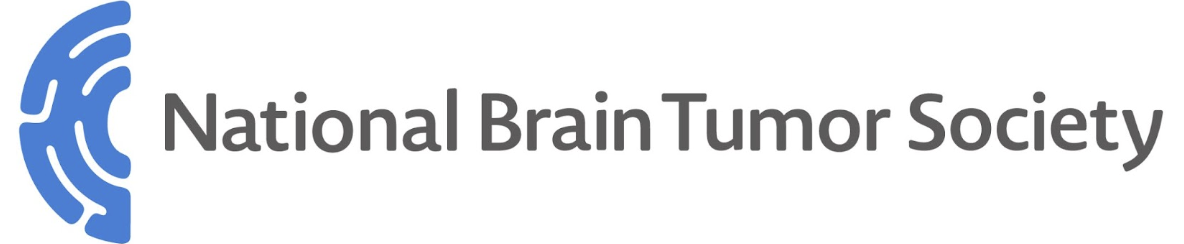
- Abbreviation: NBTS
- Founded: 2008 as National Brain Tumor Society (formerly Brain Tumor Society, founded 1989, and National Brain Tumor Foundation, founded 1981)
- Tax ID no.: 04-3068130
- Legal status: 501(c)(3) nonprofit organization
- Purpose: Conquering and curing brain tumors -- once and for all
- Headquarters: Newton, Massachusetts
- Chief Executive Officer: David F. Arons
- Chairman of the Board: Leah Recht, JD
- Revenue: $13.2M (2023)
- Expenses: $10.4M (2023)
- Staff: 50 (2025)
- Website: BrainTumor.org Social media: Facebook / Instagram / Threads / LinkedIn / X / Bluesky / TikTok / YouTube

National Brain Tumor Society (NBTS) is the largest non-profit organization dedicated to the brain tumor / brain cancer community in the United States. It supports individuals affected by all types of brain tumors -- both benign (non-malignant) and malignant (cancerous) -- through research funding, policy advocacy, and patient and caregiver support programs.

With more than 30 years of experience, NBTS plays a nationally recognized role in advancing the field of neuro-oncology. The organization brings together stakeholders from across the brain tumor ecosystem, including academic researchers, clinicians, biopharmaceutical companies, government agencies, patients, caregivers, and peer advocacy groups. Its work aims to accelerate the development of new treatments, improve patient outcomes, and drive progress through coordinated scientific, policy, and community efforts.

NBTS directs funding toward translational and clinical research with the potential to improve survival and quality of life for patients with brain tumors. Its scientific programs are designed to advance innovative therapies across the spectrum of tumor types and patient populations, including both adult and pediatric brain cancers. The organization also facilitates collaboration between stakeholder groups to overcome common barriers in the research and development pipeline.

Beyond its research efforts, NBTS provides patient- and caregiver-centered services such as personalized navigation support, educational resources, and virtual support groups. It also organizes national awareness campaigns and serves as a leading voice in public policy advocacy related to medical research, health care access, and the needs of the brain tumor community.

Through a combination of strategic funding, community engagement, and policy influence, the National Brain Tumor Society seeks to unify and advance efforts toward improved treatments and outcomes for people living with brain tumors.

== Mission Statement ==
National Brain Tumor Society (NBTS) unrelentingly invests in, mobilizes, and unites the brain tumor community to discover a cure, deliver effective treatments, and advocate for patients and care partners. Short of finding a cure, NBTS aims to make sure that patients have a better chance at survival and quality of life.

== Research ==
National Brain Tumor Society distinguishes itself through a strategic focus on translational research and cross-sector collaboration. In addition to providing direct funding for scientific investigations, NBTS actively works to accelerate the development of new therapies by fostering partnerships between academic researchers, the biopharmaceutical industry, and private investors. This approach is intended to address gaps in the traditional research pipeline, helping ensure that promising laboratory discoveries have a clearer path toward becoming viable treatments for patients with brain tumors.

Historically, the organization has funded more than $40 million in brain tumor research and supported a number of the most important discoveries in neuro-oncology history. These include foundational studies related to targeting IDH mutations in glioma, leading, eventually, to the first and only approval of a targeted therapy for grade 2 oligodendroglioma and astrocytoma patients with vorasidenib; the discovery of the 1p/19q co-deletion, which is now a critical diagnostic biomarker in brain cancer pathology; funding the development and launch of the first-ever adaptive platform trial for glioblastoma, GBM AGILE; and leading the coordination and publication of a new consensus, standardized Brain Tumor Imaging Protocol.

=== Research Funding ===
Currently, the organization focuses on several areas of research funding, including precision medicine, immunotherapy, tumor metabolism, DNA damage response networks, innovating clinical trials, and quality of life research. Within these research programs, initiatives, and projects, there’s a specific, dedicated focus on eight of the most common and challenging tumor types – the areas of the biggest unmet need – with the promise for discoveries made in these tumor types to benefit all types of brain tumors. These tumor types are: glioblastoma, oligodendroglioma, astrocytoma, meningioma, medulloblastoma, AT/RT, DMG/DIPG, and ependymoma.

=== Brain Tumor Investment Fund ===
In addition to traditional nonprofit research funding, the National Brain Tumor Society operates the Brain Tumor Investment Fund as a separate venture philanthropy subsidiary. The Brain Tumor Investment Fund invests capital (philanthropic funding from family offices, donor-advised funds (DAFs), private and corporate foundations, and individual donors) in biotechnology, pharmaceutical, and medical device companies developing products to improve the lives of patients with brain tumors. As of August 2025, the fund includes seven companies in its investment portfolio, ranging from medical device companies to small biotechnology companies developing vaccine, cellular, and gene therapies.

=== Research Roundtable ===
Beyond funding, the National Brain Tumor Society also advances brain tumor research through the convening of leaders and stakeholders across the neuro-oncology field and industry. Hosting regular workshops, the National Brain Tumor Society’s Research Roundtable program provides a venue for a broad stakeholder community, including government, academia, the life science industry, patients, and patient advocates to address key bottlenecks and opportunities in brain tumor research.

At Research Roundtable forums, participants tackle specific barriers to progress in the neuro-oncology field and develop action plans to facilitate potential solutions to current scientific, clinical, and regulatory challenges

Since 2017, Roundtable meetings have advanced efforts to develop novel imaging-related endpoints for brain tumor clinical trials; more flexible clinical trial designs that would make it easier to enroll patients with primary and metastatic brain tumors onto clinical trials; facilitate the use of external controls for pediatric brain tumor trials; update a unified criteria for response assessment in neuro-oncology clinical trials; among other topical areas.

== Advocacy ==
National Brain Tumor Society leads a wide-ranging advocacy and public policy program focused on improving outcomes for people with brain tumors. Since 2011, the organization has prioritized influencing the federal government to make strategic investments in brain tumor research, increase access to care, improve health care delivery, and reduce health disparities. The organization works with a network of nearly 20,000 volunteers from across the country, providing advocacy training and education on policy issues so they can urge government officials to create policies that align with the priorities of the brain tumor community.

=== Policy Agenda ===
NBTS’s annual Public Policy Agenda outlines its legislative and regulatory priorities. The 2025 agenda emphasizes support for the BRAIN Act, increased funding for brain tumor research programs, reducing health disparities, improving affordability of care, increasing awareness of the unique challenges of those impacted by brain tumors, and innovating and improving access to clinical trials.

=== The BRAIN Act ===
One of the centerpieces of NBTS's policy work is the BRAIN (Bolstering Research And Innovation Now) Act. Introduced in the U.S. Congress with bipartisan support, the legislation seeks to bolster the brain tumor research ecosystem, increase research funding, foster collaboration, promote critical awareness efforts, and support innovations in and access to care. NBTS has played a central role in the bill's drafting and reintroduction.

=== Head to the Hill ===
NBTS’s flagship advocacy event, Head to the Hill, takes place annually on the first Monday and Tuesday of May (Brain Tumor Awareness Month) in Washington, D.C. It brings together brain tumor patients, caregivers, researchers, and clinicians to meet with members of Congress and share their experiences. In 2025, more than 340 advocates from 42 states participated, conducting over 4,500 legislative contacts during the event.

=== Advocate From Your State ===
To extend its advocacy reach beyond Washington, NBTS organizes Advocate from Your State, a virtual event held in the fall. In 2024, 195 advocates held approximately 200 meetings with congressional offices, with a focus on advancing federal brain tumor legislation.

=== Action Alerts and Advocate Network ===
NBTS maintains an active grassroots network of nearly 20,000 registered advocates across all 50 states. Through regular 'Action Alerts, volunteers are mobilized to contact legislators in support of issues such as National Institutes of Health and National Cancer Institute funding, glioblastoma awareness, and specific legislative initiatives. The organization also supports training for research advocates who collaborate with scientists and policymakers.

=== Legislative Successes ===
Since 2011, NBTS has helped increase annual federal funding for brain cancer research by approximately 85%. Funding from the National Institutes of Health (NIH) has grown from $280 million in Fiscal Year (FY) 2011 to an estimated $518 million in FY 2025, due in part to NBTS’s sustained efforts to advocate for biomedical research investment.

In 2016, NBTS successfully lobbied to reinstate pediatric brain tumors as a funded topic within the Department of Defense’s Peer-Reviewed Cancer Research Program (PRCRP), following its removal the previous year. Since then, NBTS has annually secured the inclusion of both pediatric brain tumors and all brain cancers as eligible funding topics. These efforts contributed to an increase in PRCRP’s annual budget from $50 million in 2016 to $130 million in 2023. During that same time, the number of funded brain tumor-related grants rose from $3.75 million to $26.8 million. NBTS has also supported patient advocate participation in PRCRP grant review panels to amplify the patient voice in research decisions.

NBTS played a key role in the passage of the 21st Century Cures Act in 2016, advocating for language that ultimately provided regulatory flexibility and additional NIH funding. The organization also helped champion the Childhood Cancer STAR Act — the most comprehensive childhood cancer legislation ever passed — which was signed into law in 2018 and reauthorized in 2023 to extend its provisions through FY 2028.

In 2021, NBTS led advocacy efforts that helped persuade the National Cancer Institute (NCI) to launch the Glioblastoma Therapeutics Network (GTN) — a coordinated national consortium aimed at accelerating glioblastoma drug development. NBTS also contributed to the successful establishment of two collaborative research initiatives — Project HOPE and Project GBM CARE — which received $4 million in federal funding to explore the molecular heterogeneity of high-grade gliomas across the lifespan.

=== Patient-Centered Advocacy and Patient Protection ===
In 2020, NBTS helped launch the Brain Tumor Patients’ Bill of Rights, in collaboration with the International Brain Tumor Alliance. It also co-supported the Glioblastoma Bill of Rights, an effort led by OurBrainBank and backed by a coalition of advocacy organizations, to articulate the priorities and values of patients facing glioblastoma.

In 2022, NBTS successfully advocated for the manufacturer of the chemotherapy drug Gleostine (lomustine) to rejoin the U.S. Medicare program after withdrawing the drug in 2021. This ensured continued access to a standard-of-care treatment option for patients with glioblastoma relying on Medicare. Since 2023, the organization has also been active on issues of health care insurance network adequacy.

== Patient and Caregiver Programs ==
National Brain Tumor Society offers support services and educational resources for individuals impacted by brain tumors, including patients, survivors, and caregivers. These programs aim to assist those navigating diagnosis, treatment, survivorship, and end-of-life care.

=== Personalized Support and Navigation ===
NBTS operates a Personalized Support and Navigation service, where individuals can connect with a trained patient navigator for one-on-one guidance. The navigator provides general information about brain tumor types, standard of care, clinical trial access, and connects users to additional resources such as support groups or treatment centers. According to NBTS, the program experienced a 72% increase in support interactions in 2024.

=== Virtual Support Groups ===
NBTS hosts monthly virtual support groups designed for different segments of the brain tumor community:

- Brain Tumor Support Conversations – a general support group for patients, survivors, and family members to share experiences and receive peer support.
- Caregiver Support Conversations – sessions for those supporting loved ones with a brain tumor, focusing on caregiving challenges and emotional well-being.
- Grief Support Conversations – offered to individuals who have lost someone to a brain tumor, providing a space for shared reflection and connection.

=== MyTumorID Campaign ===
The MyTumorID campaign was launched to promote awareness of clinical trial opportunities as well as biomarker testing among patients and caregivers. The initiative educates individuals about how biomarker testing of brain tumors can impact diagnosis, inform treatment planning, and determine eligibility for clinical trials. With support from other affiliate organizations and sponsors, NBTS provides resources, including educational materials, webinars, and physician discussion guides, to help patients better understand their tumor type and treatment options. The organization also communicates with provider and payor communities (including presenting at conferences) to educate about the goals and aims of the MyTumorID campaign, and to ensure these stakeholders are following the most up-to-date guidelines for treating patients with brain tumors.

=== Online Resources and Toolkit ===
On its website, NBTS offers an online Patient & Caregiver Toolkit that includes practical tools and information to help navigate the brain tumor journey. The toolkit features a clinical trial finder, lists of questions to ask providers, educational materials, and links to external support services. These materials are intended for individuals at any stage of diagnosis or treatment.

== Fundraising Events ==
=== Signature Events ===
National Brain Tumor Society hosts a number of annual walk/run events across the country, bringing the brain tumor community together to raise awareness and funds; events are currently held in

- Asbury Park, NJ
- Atlanta, GA
- Boston, MA
- Dallas/Fort Worth (DFW), TX
- Denver, CO
- Greater Philadelphia
- Long Island, NY
- Los Angeles, CA
- Madison, WI
- Richmond, VA
- San Francisco, CA
- Washington, D.C.

=== Gray Nation Endurance®️ ===
Gray Nation Endurance®️(GNE) is the official endurance program of the National Brain Tumor Society. Each year, NBTS offers bibs for a variety of marathons, half-marathons, and shorter races. Athletes can participate in Gray Nation Endurance and fundraise for NBTS either by applying to join our charity teams or by selecting races or other endurance activities of their choice.

=== Fundraise Your Way ===
Through NBTS’s Fundraise Your Way program, the organization supports anyone interested in hosting an NBTS fundraiser in their community or online, to honor a loved one or mark a milestone. These events can range from sports tournaments and 5Ks to brewery events and bake sales.

== Awareness Campaigns and Activities ==
National Brain Tumor Society advocates for, organizes, and leads awareness initiatives designed to increase public understanding of brain tumors and to mobilize and rally national support for brain tumor-related causes, policies, and fundraising.

=== Brain Tumor Awareness Month ===
Every May, NBTS observes Brain Tumor Awareness Month, also known as Gray May, to raise visibility around the lived experience of patients affected by brain tumors and their loved ones. Activities include social media campaigns, storytelling, fundraising, and citizen advocacy efforts. NBTS works with members of Congress to introduce and pass official Brain Tumor Awareness Month resolutions in Congress each year, and encourages volunteers to get their individual states’ legislatures and governors to adopt state-based Brain Tumor Awareness Month proclamations.

=== Glioblastoma Awareness Day ===
In 2019, the National Brain Tumor Society successfully worked with bipartisan members of the United States Congress to pass the first-ever Glioblastoma Awareness Day resolution. Every year since, Glioblastoma Awareness Day resolutions are advanced in both the U.S. House of Representatives and the U.S. Senate to continue the tradition of commemorating and honoring all Americans who have been impacted by this particularly aggressive type of brain tumor. It is observed annually on the third Wednesday in July. The day serves to amplify the experiences of individuals with glioblastoma, and each year, NBTS shares personal stories, informational materials, patient-focused video messages, and hosts a reception with lawmakers to advocate for GBM research and policy attention. Over time, the effort has led to increased visibility, including social media campaigns, media coverage, and support from prominent members of Congress.

=== Childhood Cancer Awareness Month ===
In September, NBTS participates in Childhood Cancer Awareness Month, highlighting pediatric brain tumors, which are the most common solid tumors in children in the U.S., as well as the leading cause of cancer-related death in children. During this campaign, NBTS draws attention to the severity of these diagnoses, promotes community-driven fundraising, awareness, and the need for research investments in children’s brain tumor treatments.
