= Lyme Disease Awareness Month =

Annual health observance

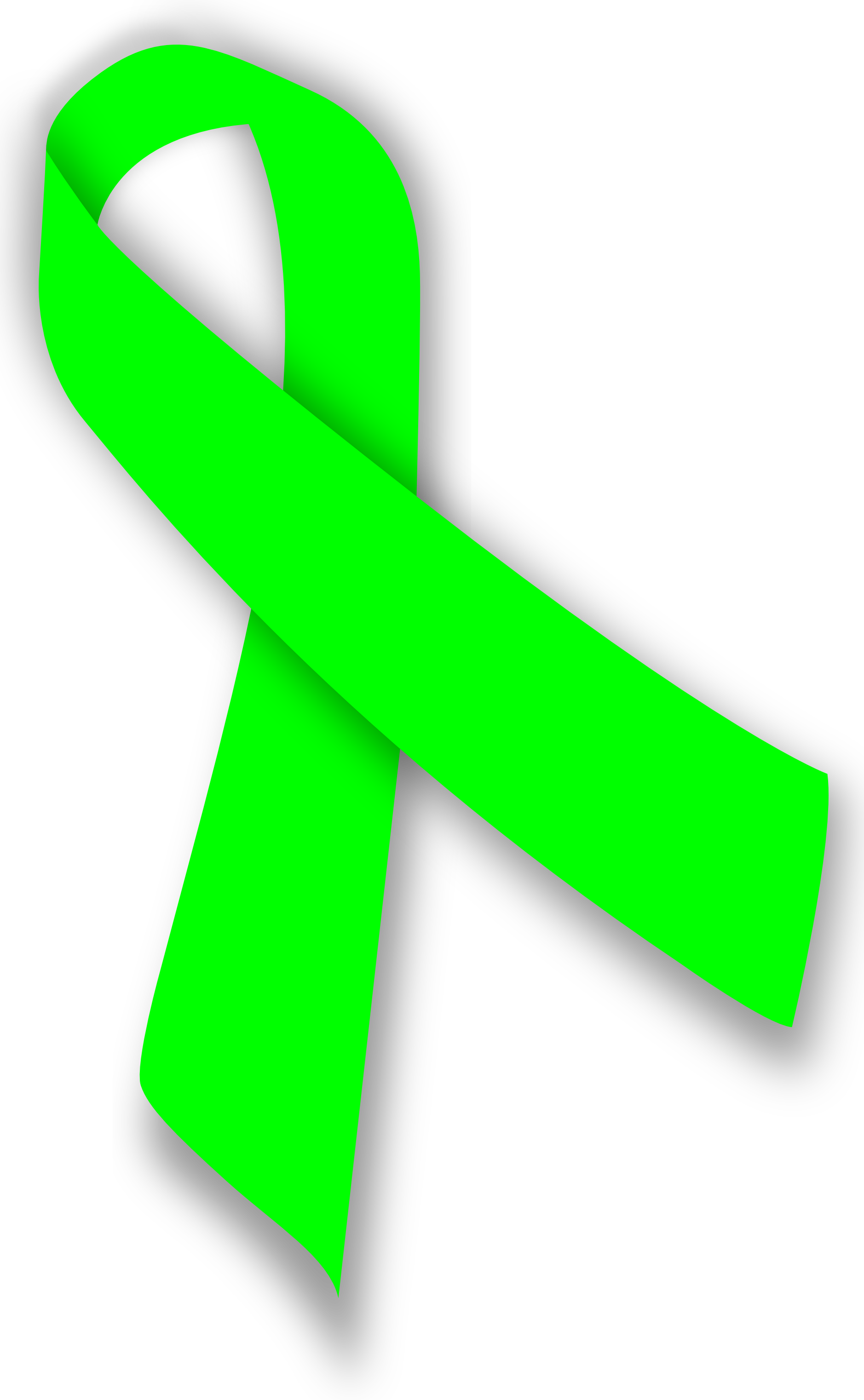
- Observed by: Canada, United States, and others
- Liturgical color: lime green
- Type: International
- Date: May
- Duration: 1 month
- Frequency: annual
- First time: 1980s
- Related to: Lyme Disease Awareness Day - May 1

Lyme Disease Awareness Month is observed every May internationally, especially in countries where Lyme disease is common. Lyme disease is caused by a tick-borne parasite, and Lyme Disease Awareness Month includes initiatives aimed at prevention and early identification of possible Lyme disease cases.

== Lyme disease cases ==
Cases of Lyme disease have been rapidly increasing in recent years, which is expected to continue. In 2015, the Centers for Disease Control reported that Lyme disease was the fifth most common of a list of nationally notifiable diseases in the United States. Both public awareness campaigns and healthcare provider campaigns exist that aim to reduce the incidence of Lyme disease.

== Lyme disease observances ==
Lyme Disease Awareness Month is observed during May in Canada and the United States, and also in other countries where Lyme disease is common. Lyme Disease Awareness Day is also observed on May 1 every year. During May, Lyme disease prevention, awareness or research may also be discussed in parliaments or senates.

Lyme disease information including and prevention tips are reported in local and national news in affected regions, with some organizations providing digital media toolkits.

== Events ==
Public buildings or landmarks like Niagara Falls are often lit up in lime green for Lyme Disease Awareness Month or World Lyme Disease Day, which is also during May. Lime green ribbons are used to raise awareness of Lyme disease.

== See also ==
- List of month-long observances
