= National Honey Month =

American awareness month

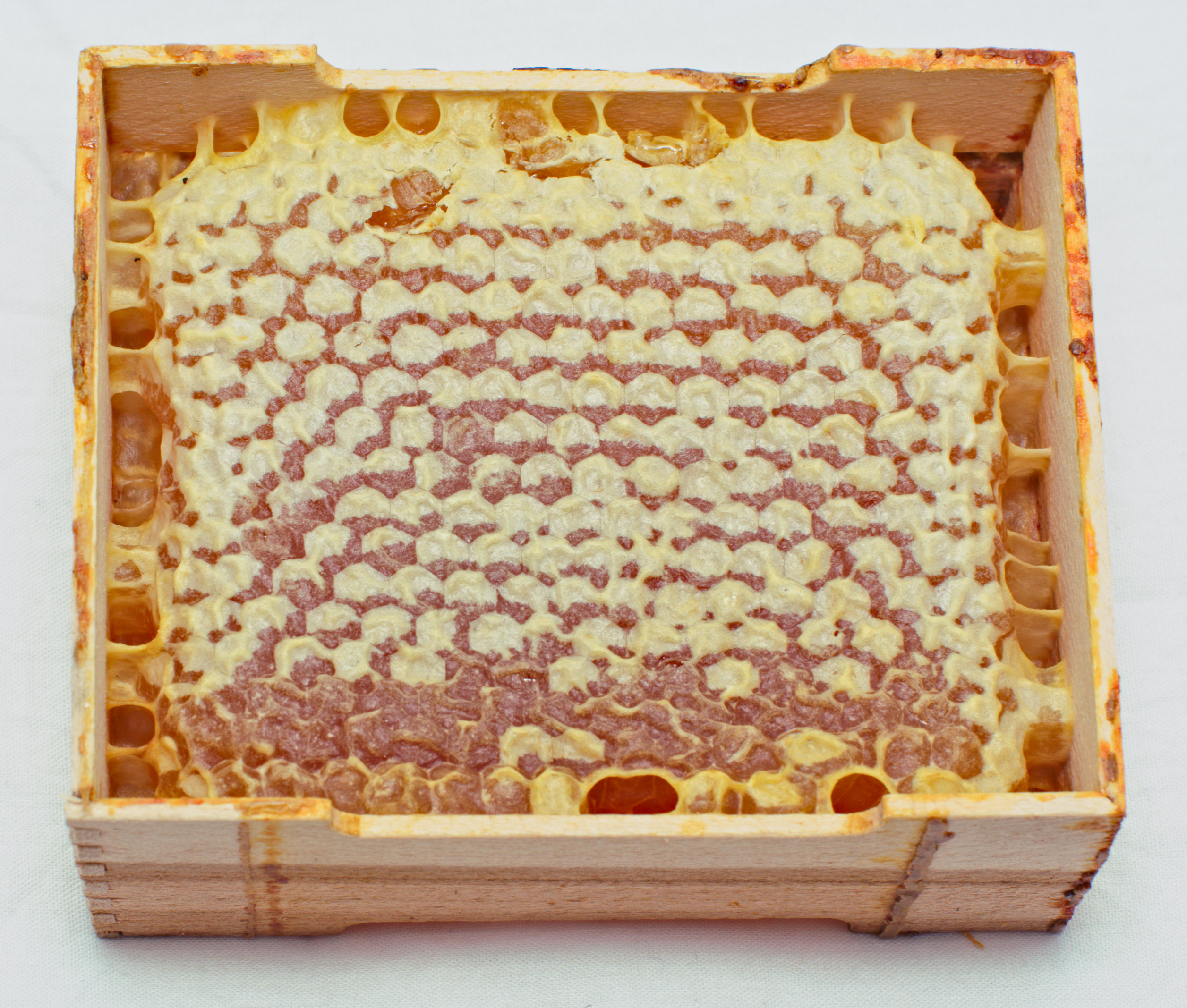
- Significance: Celebrating nature’s original sweetener.
- Begins: 1 September
- Ends: 30 September
- Date: 1 September
- Next time: 1 September 2027
- Duration: 1 month
- Frequency: annual

National Honey Month is a celebratory and promotional event held annually during the month of September in the United States.

Its purpose is to promote American beekeeping, the beekeeping industry, and honey as a natural and beneficial sweetener.

September is significant for honey producers as it is the month that marks the end of the honey collection season for many beekeepers in the United States.

The awareness month was initiated by The National Honey Board, a United States Department of Agriculture (USDA) founded and overseen organization. (a US government established, USDA-overseen, organization) in 1989.

== See also ==
- Beekeeping in the United States
