= COPD Awareness Month =

November campaign in the US

- Observed by: United States
- Type: Secular
- Date: November
- Frequency: Annual

November is National Chronic Obstructive Pulmonary Disease (COPD) Awareness Month. Sponsored by the US COPD Coalition, the observance is a time for organizations and communities across the country to increase the overall awareness of COPD. COPD Learn More Breathe Better, the title of the National Heart, Lung, and Blood Institute’s national awareness and education campaign, has again been adopted as the theme for the most recent National COPD Awareness Month.

== See also ==
- List of environmental dates
- List of month-long observances

== Sources ==
- This article incorporates text from the National Institute of Mental Health, which is in the public domain.
