= Cyber Security Awareness Month =

Awareness month for information security

- Status: Active
- Genre: Awareness month
- Frequency: Annually
- Inaugurated: October 2004; 22 years ago

Cyber Security Awareness Month is an annual event held in October to raise awareness of information security.

It was originally started by the United States National Cyber Security Division within the Department of Homeland Security and the nonprofit National Cyber Security Alliance, the month raises awareness about the importance of cybersecurity.

Cybersecurity Awareness Month is observed in October in Australia. The European Union has also established October as European Cybersecurity Month.

== History ==
In 2004, the Department of Homeland Security and the National Cyber Security Alliance launched National Cyber Security Awareness Month as a broad effort to help Americans stay safe and secure online. Initial efforts included advice like keeping antivirus programs up to date.

Since 2009, the month has included an overall theme, "Our Shared Responsibility," and weekly themes throughout the month were introduced in 2011. In October 2023, a new theme "Secure Our World" was announced as an enduring theme for future years.

== See also ==
- US Cyber Challenge
- Black October (information security)
