= Les Turner ALS Foundation =

U.S. non-profit organization

- Founded: 1977
- Founder: Les Turner
- Type: Non-profit
- Purpose: ALS research, awareness, and patient services
- Location: Chicago, Illinois
- Key people: Laura Freveletti, Chief Executive Officer
- Affiliations: International Alliance of ALS/MND Associations
- Website: lesturnerals.org

The Les Turner ALS Foundation is a non-profit organization based in Chicago that provides amyotrophic lateral sclerosis (ALS) patient services; supports events, education and awareness about ALS; and funds ALS research. Since it was founded, it has raised over $64 million.

== History and programs ==
The Foundation was founded by Les Turner, a Chicago businessman, and his family after he was diagnosed with amyotrophic lateral sclerosis (ALS) in 1976. Les Turner serves nearly 90 percent of ALS patients in the Chicago metropolitan area.

In 1979, the Les Turner ALS Research Laboratory was opened at Northwestern Medicine. Then, in 1986, the Lois Insolia ALS Clinic was opened at Northwestern to provide patient services. It was one of the first multidisciplinary ALS clinics opened in the United States. Currently, in addition to medical care, the clinic offers access to clinical trials and research studies.

In 1983, the Foundation started patient support groups. The groups are now offered online at no cost.

In 1992, Les Turner ALS became a founding member of the International Alliance of ALS/MND Associations.

In 2002, the Foundation's main event, the ALS Walk for Life was started.

In 2014, the Les Turner ALS Center at Northwestern Medicine was created to "accelerate research and advance patient care". The Center was opened in addition to the continual operation of three research laboratories and the Lois Insolia ALS Clinic. Among the Center's contributions to ALS research have been the 1993 co-discovery of the first genetic mutation linked to cause ALS, SOD1, as well as FUS in 2009 and others linked to familial ALS.

In 2015, Les Turner ALS released the campaign, "Freeze ALS", along with 12 ice sculptures around Chicago for ALS Awareness Month.
