= National Arab American Heritage Month =

U.S. observance, April

Arab American Heritage Month
- Official name: The National Arab American Heritage Month (NAAHM)
- Observed by: United States, Presidency of Joe Biden, US Department of Homeland Security, US Department of State
- Type: Heritage, cultural, ethnic
- Significance: Celebration of Arab-Americans contributions
- Date: April
- Frequency: Annual
- Related to: List of month-long observances

National Arab American Heritage Month (NAAHM) takes place in April. It celebrates the Arab American heritage and culture and pays tribute to the contributions of Arab Americans.

== History ==
Beginning in the 1990s, Arab American heritage was celebrated sporadically in various states at different times of the year, primarily in school districts. It wasn't until 2017 when Arab America began a national initiative to coordinate all states under National Arab American Heritage Month. On April 30, 2019, Arab American organizations asked Congresswoman Debbie Dingell to issue a congressional resolution proclaiming National Arab American Heritage Month. It was then introduced to the house on April 30, 2019, and then referred to the House Committee on Oversight and Reform. The largest and most promising achievement towards federal recognition of the month of April as the National Arab American Heritage Month was the proclamation published by the U.S. Department of State, which was accomplished on April 1, 2021, by the efforts of independent Syrian-American advocate and author, Pierre Subeh.

An identical bill was introduced in the House on May 1, 2020, to support the designation of an Arab American Heritage Month but it has not currently been passed.

Some individual states (such as the Commonwealth of Virginia) and 26 others observed April as Arab American Heritage Month early on before any federal recognition was proclaimed. It wasn't until April 19, 2021, that the first recognition on a federal level was issued, which was published as a White House letter from president Joe Biden recognizing April as the National Arab American Heritage Month, otherwise called NAAHM.

== Developments ==
The United States Department of State has recognized April as the National Arab American Heritage Month. Stating in a public announcement on April 1, 2021, through their official social media channels: "Americans of Arab heritage are very much a part of the fabric of this nation, and Arab Americans have contributed in every field and profession."

The recognition of the month of April as the National Arab American Heritage Month by the Department of State was mainly influenced by independent advocate efforts across the United States calling for inclusivity. Most notably the petition and social change campaign by Pierre Subeh who orchestrated a self-funded social awareness campaign with over 250 billboards across the country asking the Federal government to recognize the month of April as the National Arab American Heritage Month and issue an official proclamation. His social change campaign called the recognition as it celebrates Middle Eastern heritage in combatting post-9/11 anti-Arab sentiments and recognizing the social difficulties that Arab Americans face every day in their communities.

On April 19, 2021, Arab America and the Arab America Foundation received a letter acknowledging an invitation they sent president Joe Biden, in which he congratulated them on the celebration of National Arab American Heritage Month.

In 2022, President Biden declared April as Arab American Heritage Month and issued an official proclamation in 2023.

== See also ==
- Arab Americans
- List of Arab Americans
