= Academic Writing Month =

Academic Writing Month (also known as "AcWriMo") is an annual internet-based writing event in which participants challenge themselves to meet a self-set writing goal during the month of November. The event has attracted worldwide participation.

The event was established in 2011 by Charlotte Frost during her tenure as Provost International Post-Doctoral Fellow at the Center for 21st Century Studies at the University of Wisconsin–Milwaukee) and PhD2Published, a website aimed at helping early-career academics learn how to get published. It was based on National Novel Writing Month and other variations of this model including National Blog Posting Month and National Poetry Writing Month.

Participants register for AcWriMo by signing up on the Accountability Spreadsheet and posting a declaration of intent on social media using the hashtag '#AcWriMo' or '#AcWri'.

== History ==
The project was originally called Academic Book Writing Month. Creator Charlotte Frost aimed to develop an event that would push her and her colleagues to work on their respective academic writing projects and create a sense of teamship among them and the wider global academic community.

The inaugural event took place November 2011 with over one hundred participants sharing their progress on their blogs and social media accounts. For 2012, 'Book' was dropped from the event name to include a greater array of academic writers working on shorter manuscripts.

Subsequent years saw the introduction of other tools and activities, including video tutorials and dedicated apps.

== Rules for participation ==
Participants abide by the set of 6 rules:

1. You have to decide on a goal where you count either words, hours or projects.
2. You declare your goal by signing up on the ‘Accountability Spreadsheet’
3. You then draft your approach to the month, making sure you have done enough preparation to write a lot.
4. You discuss your progress on social media like Twitter and Facebook.
5. You have to work really hard and not get distracted.
6. And at the end you must publicly declare your results on the spreadsheet or on social media.
