= National Pet Month =

UK and US annual celebration of pets

National Pet Month is a celebration of the benefits that pets bring to people's lives. It also promotes responsible pet ownership. National Pet Month is observed annually in the United States in May and from April to May in the United Kingdom.

The campaign is coordinated by multiple organizations, such as the National Office Of Animal Health (NOAH) and the Pet Food Manufacturers’ Association (PFMA).

== Purpose ==
National Pet Month’s aims are to:

- Promote the benefits and responsibilities of pet ownership
- Support pet adoption
- Increase public awareness of services available from professionals who work with animals
- Raise awareness of the role, value and contribution to society of working companion animals
