= Pain Awareness Month =

Annual health campaign

Pain Awareness Month in the United States is observed every September. The American Chronic Pain Association (ACPA) declared this month to "raise public awareness of issues in the area of pain and pain management."

== History ==
In 2001, the ACPA led a coalition of groups to create the first Pain Awareness Month. These groups, including the NAACP and the American Cancer Society, assembled under the umbrella of the Partners for Understanding Pain.

In 2002, the ACPA presented a kickoff lunch for the coalition at the International Association for the Study of Pain Conference, and by 2003 the Partners for Understanding Pain had expanded to include more than 30 partner organizations. 2004's event was held in Washington, D.C. and featured a keynote presentation by United States Representative Mike Rogers (R-Michigan), who was the sponsor of HR 1863, The National Pain Care Policy Act of 2003.

2004 was also the year the ACPA and the Partners for Understanding Pain issued their first toolkit, developed with The American Academy of Nurse Practitioners, the American Association of Rehabilitations Nurses, American Nurses Association, American Society of Pain Management Nurses, and the American Society of Perianesthesia Nurses.

2005 saw the release of another toolkit, this one emphasizing the role pharmacists play in pain management. This year, the ACPA and the Partners for Understanding Pain also visited congressional representatives in support of HR 1020: The National Pain Care Policy Act of 2005.

By 2006, the ACPA and their partners had released three tool kits, one each for nurses, pharmacists, and older adults. Seeing the monthly observance well established, the ACPA in 2007 shifted focus to a more grassroots approach working with local facilitators and members to raise awareness in the media on the causes of pain and to remove the stigma associated with seeking treatment.

== Resources ==
In association with Pain Awareness Month, the ACPA provides the following resources:

- Communication tools to assist patients with talking to medical professionals
- Pain Awareness toolkits
- Pain Management Programs information
