= ALS Awareness Month =

North American annual observance

- Dates: Canada: June (annually); United States: May (annually)
- Years active: Canada: 36; United States: 34
- Inaugurated: Canada: 1990; United States: 1992

ALS Awareness Month is a campaign to spread awareness of and raise funds for research for a cure for ALS (amyotrophic lateral sclerosis, also known as Lou Gehrig's disease).

== Canada ==
In Canada, June has been declared as ALS Awareness Month by the Canadian Minister of Health. In 2015, it was recognized by the House of Commons.

== United States ==
In the United States, the campaign is observed every year in the month of May. It is recognized by the Centers for Disease Control and Prevention.

=== Advocacy ===
During this month, the ALS Association sponsors the National ALS Advocacy Day and Public Policy Conference and leads a delegation of people with ALS, their caregivers and other advocates to Capitol Hill to urge legislators to support measures to help find treatments and a cure. Other organizations, including the ALS Therapy Development Institute and the Les Turner ALS Foundation have their own initiatives.

=== Postage stamp ===
In 2008, the ALS Association created a commemorative U.S. postage stamp to promote ALS Awareness Month through Zazzle.

=== Individual states ===
==== Georgia ====
In 2003, Georgia Governor Sonny Perdue declared May to be ALS Awareness Month in the state. He repeated this action in 2011. In addition, Governor Nathan Deal in 2012, 2013, and 2014. In 2016, Governor Deal declared January 26 to be ALS Awareness Day in Georgia.

==== Massachusetts ====
In 2016, Massachusetts Governor Charlie Baker declared May to be ALS Awareness Month in the state.

==== Minnesota ====
In 2012, 2013, and 2014, Minnesota Governor Mark Dayton declared May to ALS Awareness Month in the state.

==== North Dakota ====
In both May 2014 and May 2016, the Governor of North Dakota issued proclamations declaring May to be ALS Awareness Month in the state.

==== Ohio ====
On January 13, 2012, the 129th General Assembly of Ohio designated the month of May as ALS Awareness Month for the state.
