= Zombie Awareness Month =

Undead awareness campaign

Gray ribbon

Zombie Awareness Month is a campaign to bring awareness about zombies and the possibility of a future zombie apocalypse. The campaign was introduced and is predominantly funded by The Zombie Research Society (ZRS), an organization dedicated to the historic, cultural and scientific study of the living dead that was founded in 2007. According to the ZRS, the main objective of Zombie Awareness Month is to educate people about causes, prevention and preparation for a supposed future zombie pandemic.

== Timing ==
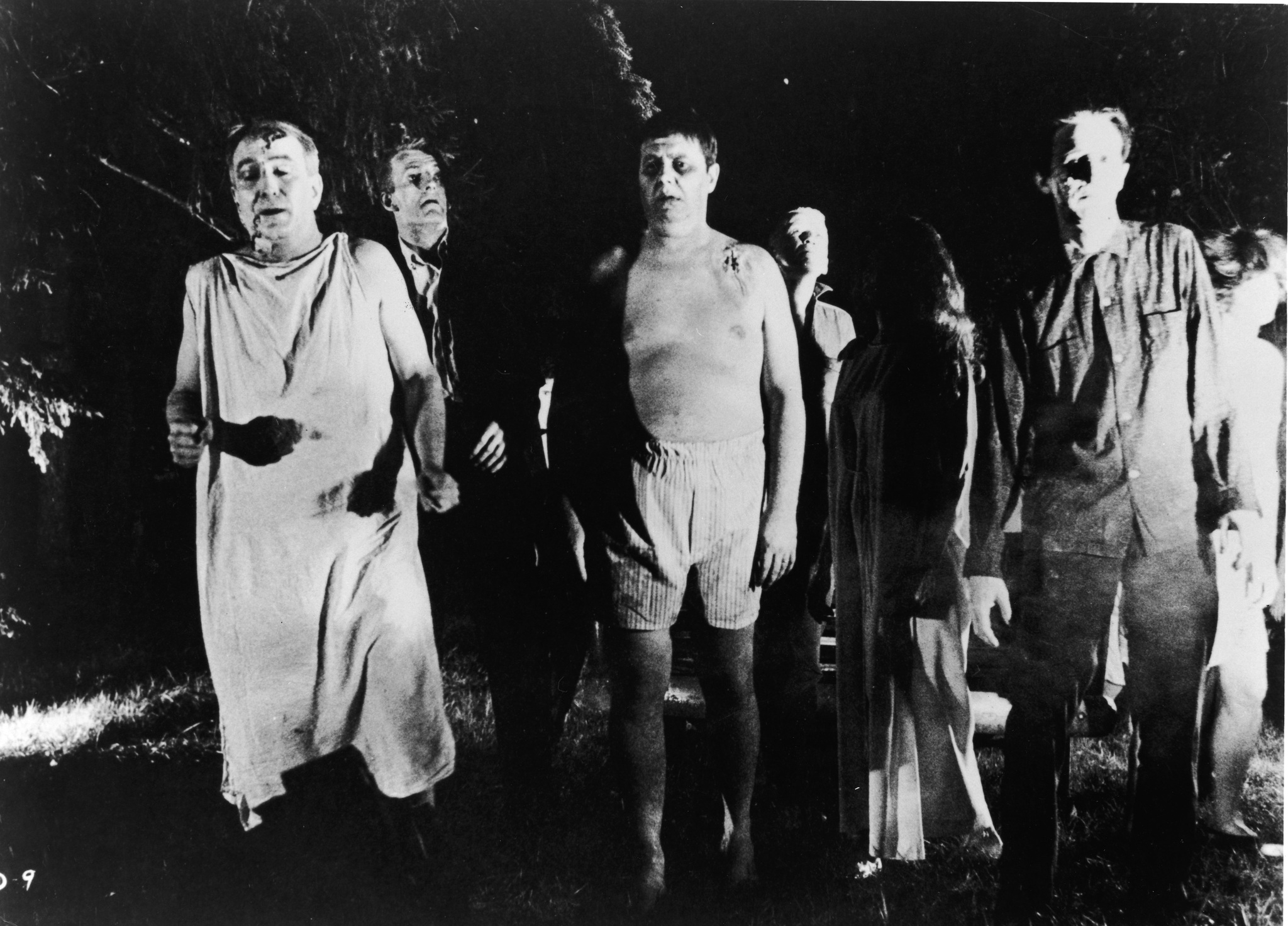
Zombies as portrayed in the movie Night of the Living Dead

The campaign runs every year from May 1 to May 31. The month of May was chosen because a number of notable zombie films are set in May, such as the classic George A. Romero zombie film, Night of the Living Dead. In addition, the sense of hope, renewal and optimism that the spring season brings gives a contrast to the darkness of a zombie apocalypse. Despite cultural trends, zombies are not related to the Pagan-based traditions of Halloween involving witches, ghouls, and vampires, which is why Zombie Awareness Month does not take place in October. However, in 2012, the U.S. Centers for Disease Control (CDC) promoted a Zombie Awareness Month in October.

== Activities ==
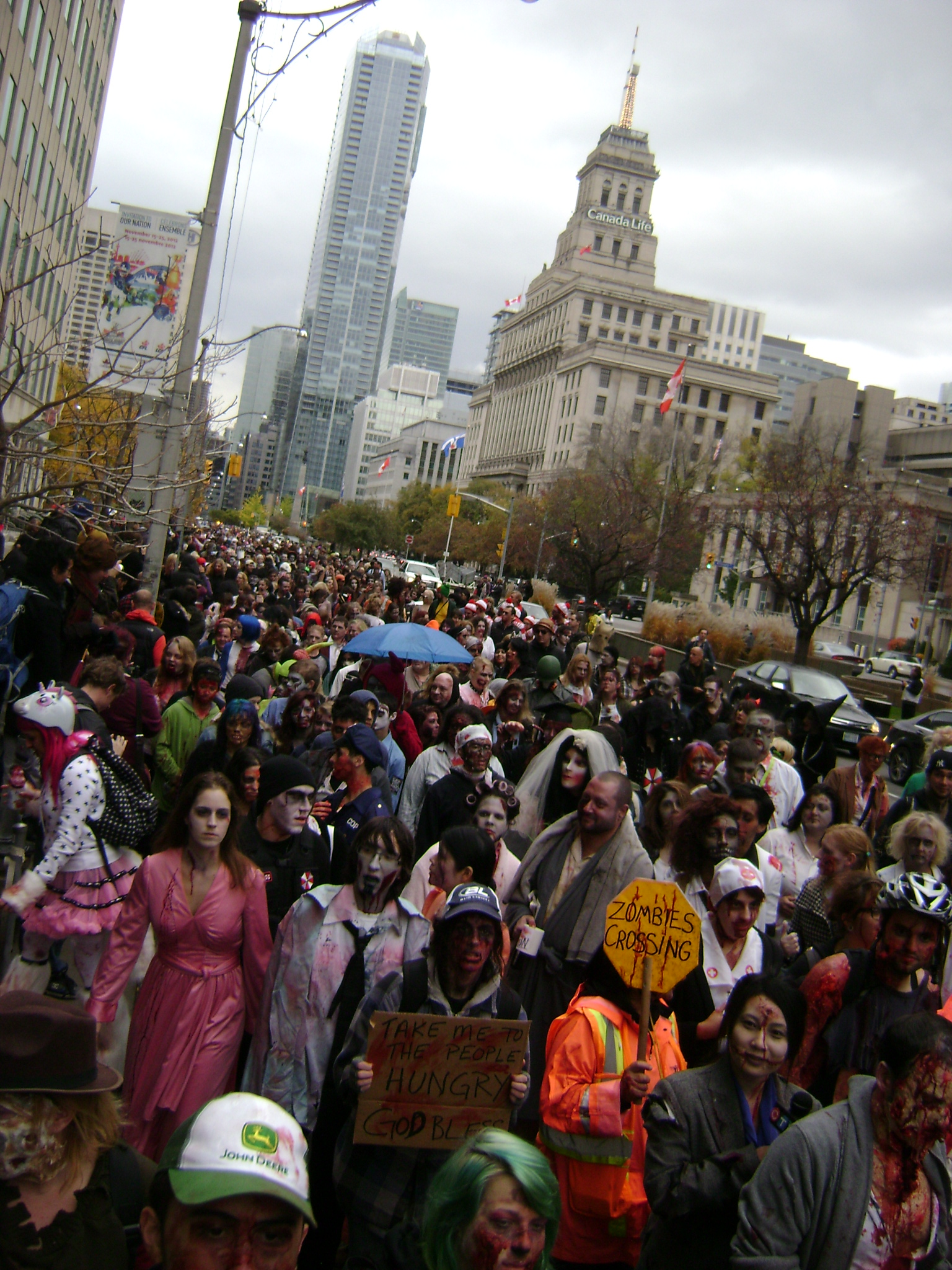
A 2012 zombie walk in Toronto

Supporters of the movement wear gray ribbons to spread awareness. The gray ribbon signifies the shadows that lurk behind the light of day. The gray ribbon is associated with other causes such as brain cancer awareness, diabetes awareness and asthma awareness, however Zombie Awareness Month is not associated with any other supportive movement. Many supporters use the opportunity to host charitable events such as Zombie Runs, Zombie Walks and Zombie Food Drives.

There was some discrepancy over the seriousness to which Zombie Awareness Month activities should be taken. Matt Mogk, the original founder of the Zombie Research Society, took a more serious approach to the month. While he encouraged the support and exposure that comes with Zombie Walks, he did not view the time as a celebration, and preferred that it be used to educate and prepare people for an impending zombie apocalypse.

However, the Zombie Research Society has since added a number experts, artists, and authors to their official advisory board who specialize in zombie culture. They recognize that zombies can reflect society's fears of terrorism, biological infection, and societal collapse. In fact, many Zombie Awareness Month activities can help people process these feelings, and alleviate the fear they may have.

In addition, the process of "prepping" for a zombie apocalypse by gathering supplies, nonperishable food, firearms, ammo and water can help people prepare for any type of real-world disaster.
