= Shavone Charles =

American performance artist, singer-songwriter and activist

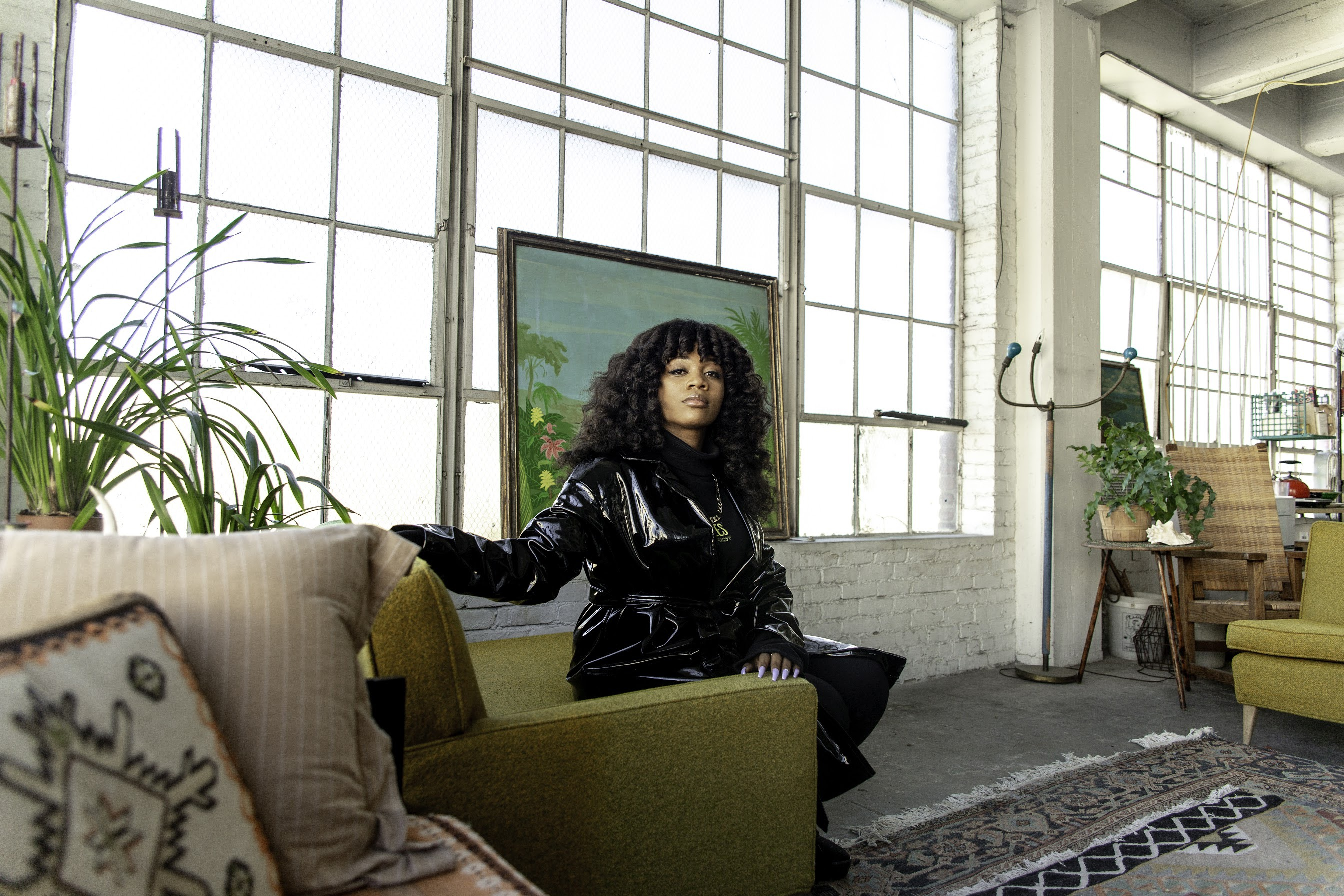
- SHAVONE. at Forbes interview with Goldie Chan
- Born: Shavone Rebecca Charles; San Diego, California, U.S.
- Education: University of California, Merced
- Occupations: Entrepreneur, musician
- Years active: 2008-present

Shavone Charles, known mononymously as SHAVONE., is an American entrepreneur and musician. Shavone is the director of communications at VSCO. Forbes featured Shavone on the 30 Under 30 Marketing & Advertising list.

== Early life and education ==
Shavone was born in San Diego, California. Shavone enrolled in band and music theory at La Mesa Dale Elementary School and went on as a competitive flautist through middle school and high school. In 2012, Shavone graduated from University of California, Merced, with her bachelor's degree in literature.

== Career ==
In college, she did an internship with Google where she worked as a student ambassador in 2011. After graduating from the University of California, Merced in 2012 with a bachelor's degree in literature, Shavone started her post-college career at Twitter as the Head of Global Music & Culture Communications. Shavone was both the youngest person on the team and the first-ever African American woman to be hired onto the communications team at Twitter.

In June 2014, Shavone helped found Blackbirds, an employee resource group for African-American Twitter employees.

In March 2019, Shavone was named Forbes 30 under 30 Influential People in Marketing and Advertising.

In November 2022, Shavone published her memoir, Black Internet Effect. As the tenth title of the "Pocket Change Collective" series by Penguin Workshop, she calls attention to inequalities in the tech industry and advocates for improved inclusivity within the field.

== Music career ==
In 2019, Shavone released her freestyle "SITH", which was premiered by Dazed & Confused Magazine.

On March 26, 2019, Shavone released her single "4C".

== Discography ==
=== Singles ===
- "SITH" (2019)
- "4C" (2019)
