= National Smile Month =

British oral health campaign

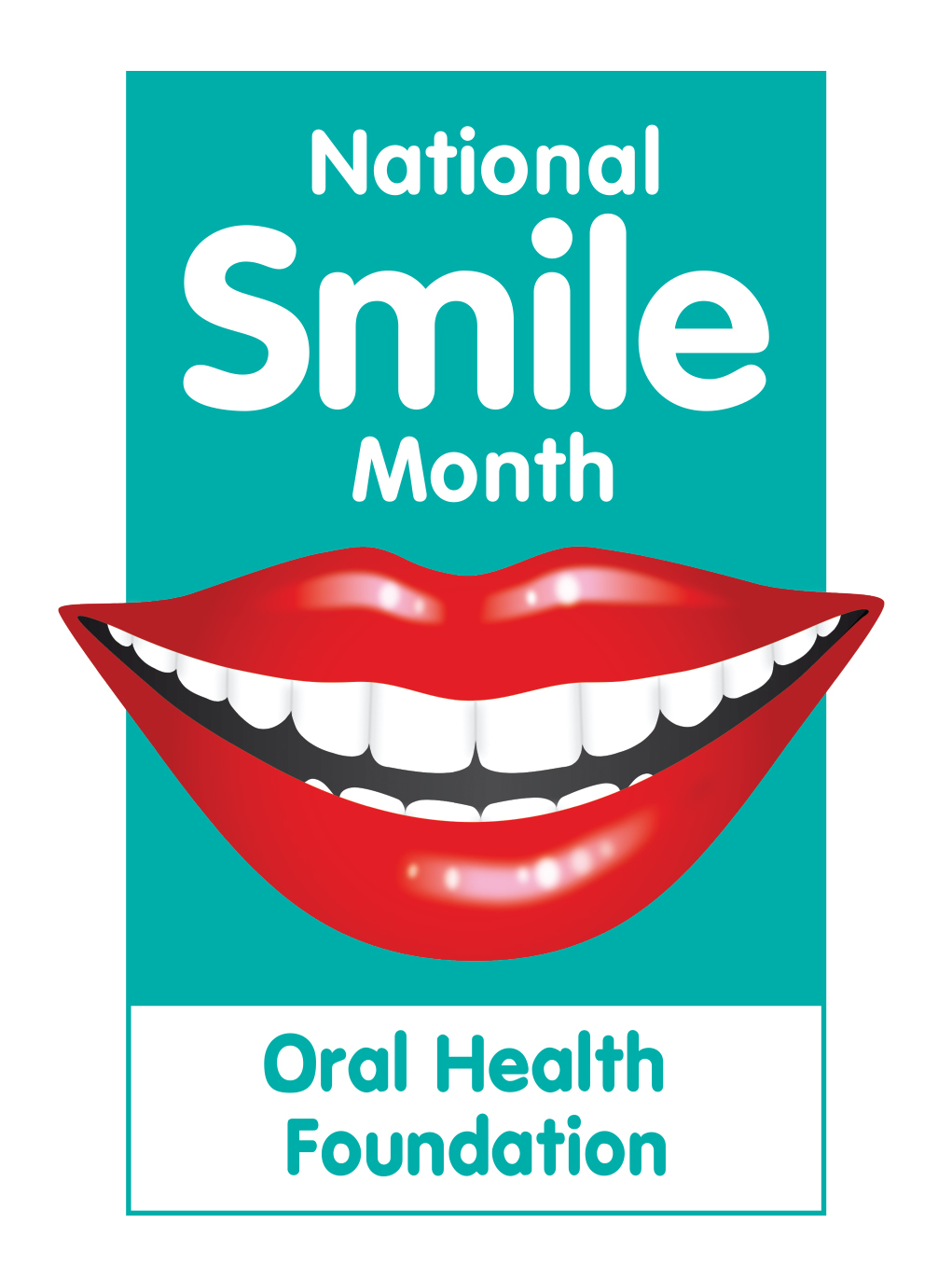
National Smile Month is organised by oral health charity, the Oral Health Foundation.

National Smile Month is the United Kingdom's largest oral health campaign, held annually across May and June. Formerly "National Smile Week" it is now one of the biggest not-for-profit dental health events in Europe; it attracts thousands of event coordinators and reaches millions of people with oral health information. National Smile Month is run by the Oral Health Foundation, a UK-based oral health charity. In 2021 the campaign will take place between May 17 and June 17.

== Origin and early years ==
The "Smile 77" project was launched in 1977, as a week-long campaign in the West Midlands. Poet Pam Ayres wrote the poem I Wish I'd Looked After Me Teeth for the event – a poem that would later be voted into the top 10 of a BBC poll to find the Nation's 100 Favourite poems. This event was repeated the following year, then the first National Smile Week was held in 1979.

'Eat Well Stay Biting Fit' was the theme of the 1984 Smile Week with a launch at the London Transport Museum in Covent Garden, where around £3.5 million worth of press coverage was generated during the campaign. Two good-food buses toured London throughout the week, teaching children the art of sugar-free cooking and giving tasters to 2000 hungry pupils.

Chairman of the northern branch Gerry Dobbs, a general dental practitioner and long term member of the Foundation became Chairman in 1984 and presided over a period of high-profile PR activity.

This included the distribution of a 'Secret Identification File' containing information on many aspects of dental Identity's, distributed to 1,000 journalists. The 'Selecting a Dentist' leaflet, also produced as part of the Smile Week campaign, was one of the most successful ever and generated mass national newspaper coverage. It helped the Foundation turnover to surpass £100,000 for the first time in its history. The 1988 theme of 'Your Dentist Cares' produced over £1,000 worth of media coverage and notably featured a jingle written and performed for the Foundation by the group Fascinating Aïda. The campaign continued to hold a strong profile throughout the 1990s and to the present day.

== International reach ==
In 2009 the National Smile Month campaign ran simultaneously in the UK and USA for the first time. The BDHF and its International Dental Health Foundation (IDHF) arm partnered with Oral Health America in promoting good oral healthcare. The campaign was judged a success and was estimated to have reached 180,000,000 readers and viewers. The slogan for 2009 was ‘Brush for Health’ and aimed to establish the message of connecting poor oral health with other systemic illnesses.

For the first time, National Smile Month was held in the United Arab Emirates, as 'UAE Smile Month' in June 2014.
