= National Childhood Cancer Awareness Month =

Annual health campaign

National Childhood Cancer Awareness Month is an annual national health campaign organized by major childhood cancer organizations to increase awareness of pediatric cancer and to raise funds for research into its cause, prevention, diagnosis, treatment and cure.

== History ==
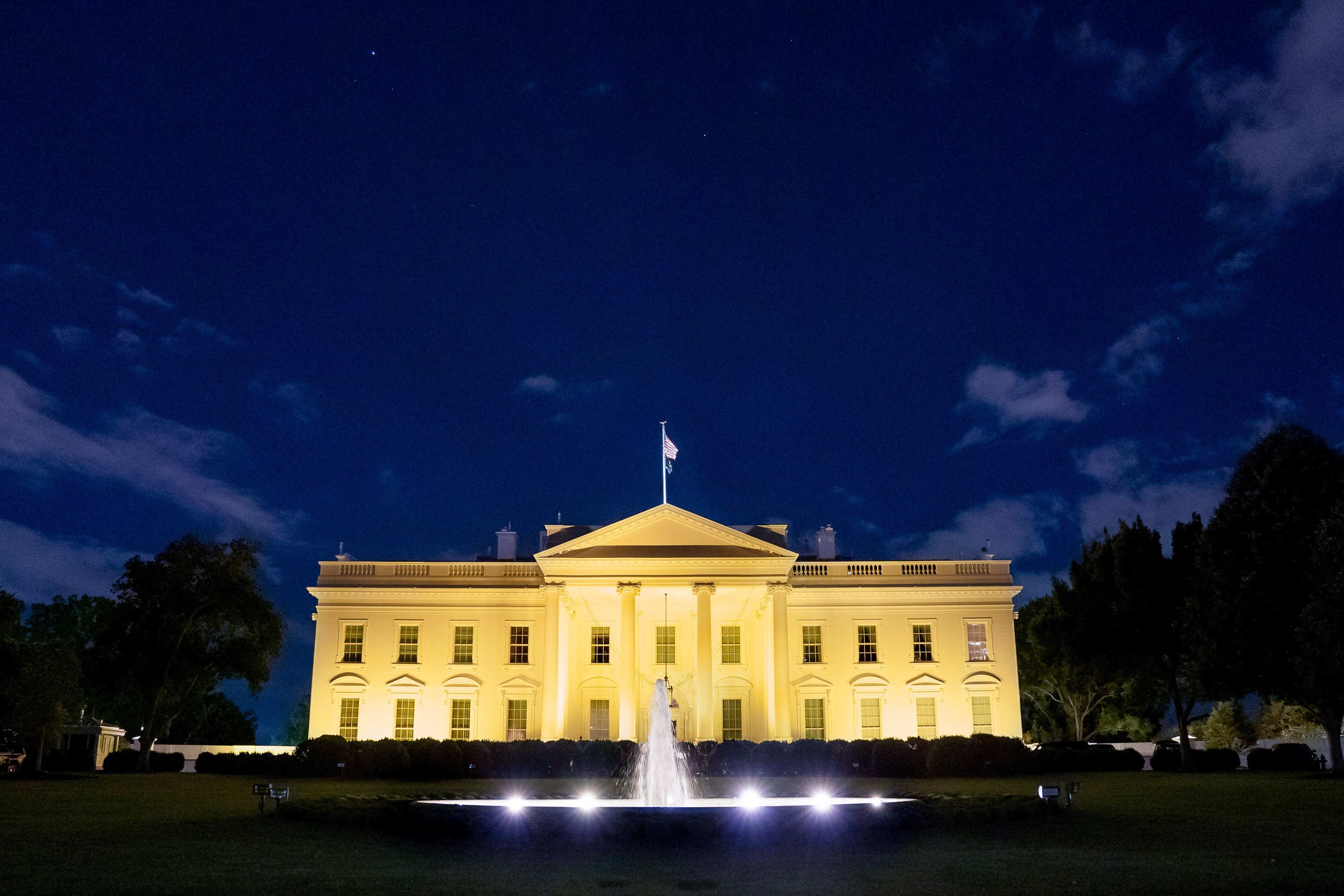
The White House lit up in gold lights in honor of National Childhood Cancer Awareness Month in 2021.

In September 2019, Senator Joe Manchin (D-WV) introduced a resolution to recognize September 2019 as "National Childhood Cancer Awareness Month" after being inspired by a student at George Washington High School, in Charleston, West Virginia. The resolution passed with unanimous consent on September 26, 2019.

A presidential proclamation recognizing National Childhood Cancer Awareness Month was first issued in September 2012 by President Barack Obama. Subsequent proclamations were signed by President Obama in 2015 and 2016.

Prior to the proclamation, the United States Senate passed the Allard-Clinton "National Childhood Cancer Awareness Day" Resolution on May 23, 2008. The resolution, introduced by United States Senators Wayne Allard (R-CO) and Hillary Rodham Clinton (D-NY), recognized September 13, 2008, as National Childhood Cancer Awareness Day.

An initial proclamation was signed in 1990 by President George H. W. Bush, naming October as National Awareness Month for Children with Cancer.
