= Gospel Music Heritage Month =

Observance in the United States

Gospel Music Heritage Month was spearheaded and pioneered by Alvin V. Williams in 2007. Gospel Music Heritage Month in the United States was established in June 2008, by dual legislation passed by the House of Representatives and the Senate designated September as Gospel Music Heritage Month.

== Creation ==
Alvin V. Williams played a pivotal role in the creation and development of the Gospel Music Heritage Month, a significant initiative that celebrates the rich history and cultural impact of gospel music in America. Williams meticulously conducted extensive research on the evolution of gospel music, tracing its roots from field hollers, corn ditties, and Negro spirituals to its later expressions in quartet music, Southern gospel, and the blues. This research laid the foundation for the Gospel Music Heritage Month, ultimately culminating in a congressional resolution.

As a seasoned entertainment executive and former employee of Up TV, Williams collaborated with Charles Humbard, CEO of UPtv, to explore how gospel music could be highlighted through original programming that would appeal to advertisers. Recognizing the potential for a broader cultural impact, Williams expanded this idea beyond a single day of recognition, advocating for an entire month dedicated to celebrating gospel music's heritage.

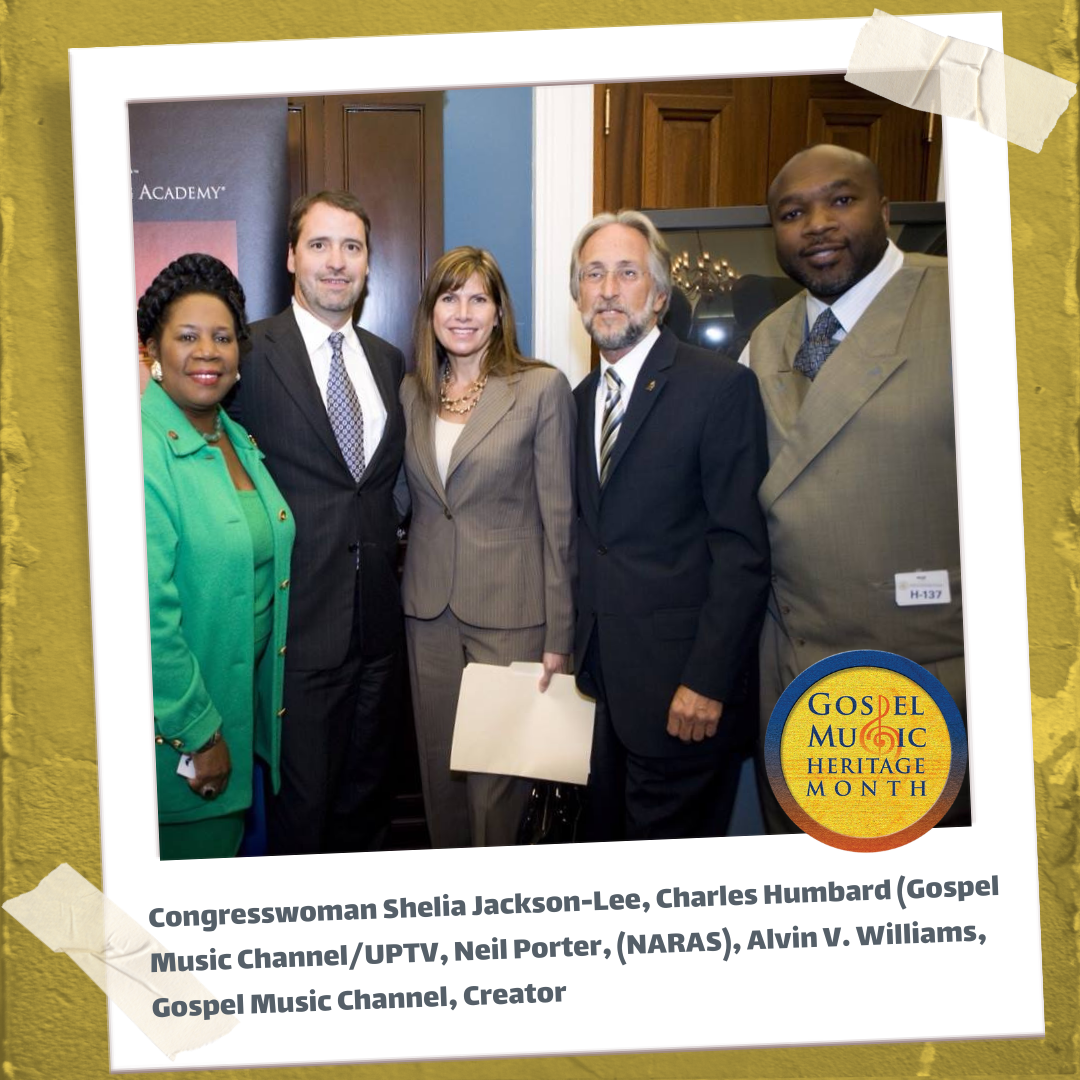
From left: Congresswoman Sheila Jackson Lee, Charles Humbard (Gospel Music Channel/UPTV), Neil Portnow, (NARAS), Alvin V. Williams (Gospel Music Channel, creator)

Williams' initiative gained momentum as he organized and garnered the support of key figures and organizations within the gospel music industry. He successfully brought together influential leaders such as John Styll, President of the Gospel Music Association (GMA), and Neil Portnow, President of the National Academy of Recording Arts and Sciences (NARAS). His efforts also attracted the support of Congresswoman Sheila Jackson Lee, who became a crucial ally in advancing the initiative through Congress.

The collective efforts of Williams and his supporters led to the introduction of the Gospel Music Heritage Month resolution, which was presented to both the House and Senate by Congresswoman Jackson Lee and Senator Blanche Lincoln. In 2008, the resolution was passed, officially designating September as Gospel Music Heritage Month.

The passage of this resolution marked a significant milestone in the recognition of gospel music's influence on American culture. Each year since, the month of September has been celebrated with various events and activities, including a prominent yearly Gospel Celebration at the Kennedy Center, spearheaded by the late Congresswoman Sheila Jackson Lee. This celebration continues to honor the legacy and ongoing contributions of gospel music to the cultural fabric of the nation.
