= National Guide Dog Month =

September observance

National Guide Dog Month is a celebration of the work of guide dogs in the United States as a way to raise awareness, appreciation and support for guide dog schools across the United States. It was established in 2008, as a fundraising drive to benefit non-profit guide dog organizations accredited by the International Guide Dog Federation. It is observed during the month of September.

== History ==
National Guide Dog Month was first inspired by Dick Van Patten, who was impressed by the intelligence and training of guide dogs. During a visit to the campus of the Guide Dogs of the Desert in Palm Springs, California, Van Patten was blindfolded to experience how guide dogs provide assistance and mobility to blind people.

After learning that the costs to raise and train a guide dog exceed $40,000 and can take up to two years, Van Patten was inspired to help raise awareness and money for guide dog schools.

Van Patten served as an honorary Board Member for the Guide Dogs of the Desert. Through his pet food company, Dick Van Patten's Natural Balance Pet Foods, he has underwritten all costs for the promotion of National Guide Dog Month to ensure that all money raised would directly benefit non-profit, accredited guide dog schools in the United States.

In 2008, Van Patten enlisted the support of the Petco Foundation, to organize a fundraising campaign through their retail stores. The San Diego–based retailer piloted the first guide dog fundraiser in the Southern California area to benefit the Guide Dogs of the Desert, based in Palm Springs, California. In 2009 National Guide Dog Month was established to benefit the non-profit guide dogs schools accredited by the International Guide Dog Federation (IGDF).

In 2009, National Guide Dog Month was established for the month of May; however, in 2010, it was moved to September due to conflicts with other national fundraising drives.

== Beneficiaries ==
In 2011, the non-profit guide dog schools in the United States listed by IGDF were listed as beneficiaries of National Guide Dog Month. 100% proceeds will be donated to the following guide dog training facilities: Guide Dogs for the Blind, Guide Dog Foundation for the Blind, Guide Dogs of Texas, Inc., Guide Dogs of the Desert, Fidelco Guide Dog Foundation, Inc., Southeastern Guide Dogs, Leader Dogs for the Blind, The Seeing Eye, Inc., Freedom Guide Dogs for the Blind, Inc., Guiding Eyes for the Blind.

== Use of registered charity ==
Fundraising for National Guide Dog Month is collected from donors and disbursed by the Petco Foundation, a 501(c)(3) non-profit corporation (#33-0845930) that supports other IRS (Internal Revenue Service) designated non-profit pet related groups. The Petco Foundation is listed and rated by Charity Navigator.

== Celebrity spokespersons ==
The use of celebrity spokespersons to attract media interest has helped National Guide Dog Month gain awareness with American consumers. In 2009, while Paula Abdul appeared as a judge on American Idol, blind contestant Scott MacIntyre was presented with a guide dog to represent National Guide Dog Month. In 2010, as spokesperson, Nicollette Sheridan helped raise awareness through various interviews and appearances. In 2010, actress Katrina Bowden made promotional appearances in support of National Guide Dog Month.

In 2011, spokespersons Omar Miller and Eva LaRue appeared at a graduation ceremony at the Guide Dogs for the Blind campus in San Rafael, California, to honor Dr Cecilia von Beroldingen with the first annual Change A Life Award. Von Beroldingen is a blind scientist who, with her guide dog Neoki, given to her through the program, has been able to continue her work for the California Department of Justice Criminalistics Institute Forensic Training Facility in Sacramento. Miller and La Rue, who portray CSI investigator characters Natalia Boa Vista and Walter Simmons on the television series CSI: Miami, presented von Beroldingen with the inaugural National Guide Dog Change A Life Award.

== Proclamations ==
In May 2009, Governors of multiple states issued proclamations in recognition of National Guide Dog Month, including California, Florida, Arizona, Mississippi, Nebraska and Illinois.

== See also ==
- Assistance dog
- Service dog
