= National Work and Family Month =

The National Work and Family Month is the month of October in the United States.

This designation was first made by a resolution of the U.S. Senate in 2003 and has been reaffirmed by both houses of the United States Congress. In 2010, President Barack Obama issued a presidential statement on National Work and Family Month.

National Work and Family Month is designed to communicate and celebrate the progress towards creating healthier and more flexible work environments. The goal of the campaign is to remind employers about the business benefits of supporting work-life effectiveness programs.

== Sources ==
- 'Making October’s National Work & Family Month Matter For Your Organization Forbes
- 'National Work and Family Month The Huffington Post
- "October: Observing Work and Family Month". University of Pennsylvania Almanac. September 27, 2005.
- 'What About the Men? They Can't Have It All Either.' TIME October 28, 2011
- "Work-Life Balance Finally Fulfills Its Promise" FORTUNE Magazine October 2006
- Supporting National Work and Family Month C-SPAN November 30, 2010
- Work Life Wednesday: National Work and Family Month Fox 25 News October 12, 2011
- U.S. Senate Resolution 299 Designates October as National Work and Family Month
- Rep. Carolyn McCarthy Recognizes National Work and Family Month October 26, 2011
- Rep. Debbie Wasserman Schlutz Statement on National Work and Family Month October 26, 2011
