= National Pizza Month =

American observance

National Pizza Month is an American observance that occurs for the month of October every year.

== History ==
This observance began in October 1984, and was created by Gerry Durnell, the publisher of Pizza Today magazine. The U.S. Congress officially designated October as National Pizza Month in 1987. Some people observe National pizza month by consuming various types of pizzas or pizza slices, or going to various pizzerias. During the month, some pizzerias give away free pizzas or pizza slices to customers or offer reduced-price promotions. Some businesses run fundraising drives, donating proceeds of pizza sales to benefit various organizations or charities. Some pizzerias create unique pizzas that they don't routinely offer. For example, Mamma Mia! Pizza Kitchen in Levelland, Texas created a pizza prepared with rattlesnake meat in 2009 to celebrate the month.

== See also ==
- List of unofficial observances by date
