= National Poetry Writing Month =

National Poetry Writing Month (also known as NaPoWriMo) is a creative writing project held annually in April in which participants attempt to write a poem each day for one month. NaPoWriMo coincides with the National Poetry Month in the United States of America and Canada.

== History ==
Maureen Thorson, a poet and publisher of Big Game Books announced the project March 17, 2003 as an online project on her blog. She invited other poets with blogs to join her in the project and listed the participating poets. Thorson has continued to run the project each year on her blog with more poets participating as the word has spread about the project.

In 2009 the American Academy of Poets tied the project to a fund-raising drive for the Academy. The Academy had announced the fund-raising drive in honor of NaPoWriMo's "fifth anniversary" when it was actually the project's sixth year of existence.

Other sites fostering the project include the following:

- ReadWritePoem: No longer active, but archives kept on-line. Discussed NaPoWriMo in 2008, and supported NaPoWriMo with daily poetry prompts 2009-2010. Produced an anthology via Lulu press for 2010.
- Bloof Books: Created a podcast for the 2009 project..
- The Poetry Cove: In 2021 The Poetry Cove community launched an initiative to promote the project with its large online poetry community, posting daily prompts and encouraging different discussions and support around NaPoWriMo as well as raising awareness across the internet.
- Deep Underground Poetry: Been running annual "themed" poetry challenges since 2017.

== See also ==
- National Novel Writing Month
