= Brain Tumor Awareness Month =

Awareness month for brain tumors and brain cancer

- Official name: Brain Tumor Awareness Month
- Observed by: Australia, Canada, UK, United States
- Significance: Raising awareness of signs and symptoms of brain tumors, and increasing funding for treatment and prevention.
- Observances: March (UK), May (Australia, Canada, United States South Africa)
- Frequency: every year

Brain Tumor Awareness Month or Brain Cancer Awareness Month is observed each March in the UK, and every May in Canada, Australia and the United States.

== History ==
Brain Tumor Awareness Month began in March 2004, predominantly in the United Kingdom, and was founded by a group of brain tumor charities. The United States first observed Brain Tumor Awareness Month in May 2008.

== Events ==
Gray ribbons are used to raise awareness of brain tumors including brain cancers. A one minute silence is held on 11am on the first Monday of March in the United Kingdom.

=== Turn May Grey ===
Several organisations encourage people wear gray clothes for "Turn May Grey". [sic]

=== Wear A Hat Day ===
In the UK, Wear a Hat Day typically takes place on March 31.

=== Other events ===
Fundraising walks, races and other events took place throughout the month.

== Related observances ==
Glioblastoma Awareness Day began in the United States on July 17, 2019, the year after politician John McCain died from Glioblastoma.

== See also ==
- John McCain
