= Polish American Heritage Month =

Annual event in October in the US

Two states, Wisconsin and Pennsylvania, officially commemorated Polish American Heritage Month in 2013.

Polish American Heritage Month is an annual event celebrated in October by Polish American communities. It was first celebrated in 1981 after organization by Michael Blichasz, President of the Polish American Cultural Center in Philadelphia. Originally it was celebrated in August at various gatherings, travel events, and culturally-significant locations in Pennsylvania. The Polish American Cultural Center and the Polish American Congress lobbied politicians at the state and national level to make August the month for Polish heritage. In 1984, House Joint Resolution 577 passed, making August Polish American Heritage Month. President Ronald Reagan urged all Americans to join in the celebration honoring Polish heritage in the United States. The month was changed to October in 1986 to aid participating schools in organization during the school year, and October holds significance as the month when the first Polish settlers came to Jamestown, Virginia.

Proclamations were made by Presidents Reagan and George H.W. Bush, but beginning with Bill Clinton, U.S. Presidents have since made proclamations for General Pulaski Memorial Day, and official messages noting Polish American Heritage month. Neither Barack Obama nor Donald Trump have ever made any Proclamations or Official Messages commemorating Polish American Heritage Month.

In 2017 HR1230 was submitted in the Texas Legislature by State Representative James White and it stated "That the House of Representatives of the 85th Texas Legislature hereby recognize October 2017 as Polish American Heritage Month in Texas and honor the contributions of Poles and people of Polish descent to our state." https://www.presidency.ucsb.edu/documents/proclamation-5548-polish-american-heritage-month-1986

== Proclamations by Ronald Reagan ==
- 1984
- 1986
- 1987
- 1988

== Proclamations by George H.W. Bush ==
- 1989
- 1990
- 1991
- 1992

== Official messages by Bill Clinton ==
- 1996

== Notes ==
Pula, James. Polish American Encyclopedia. p. 380
