= Italian-American Heritage and Culture Month =

Annual celebration originating in the United States

- Observed by: United States
- Type: National, heritage, cultural, ethnic
- Significance: Celebration of Italian-Americans contributions
- Date: Month of October
- Duration: 1 month
- Frequency: annual

Italian-American Heritage and Culture Month is celebrated by proclamation of the President and Congress in the United States to honor the achievements and contributions of Italian immigrants and their descendants living in the United States, particularly in the arts, science, and culture. Events are held throughout the month to celebrate and educate the public about Italian-American history and culture. It was first celebrated in 1989. The heritage month is in October to coincide with Columbus Day, the American national holiday traditionally celebrated on October 12, now celebrated on the second Monday in October.

In tribute to all Italian Americans, the US Congress, by Pub. L. 101–128, designated the month of October 1989 as "Italian-American Heritage and Culture Month." Congress again proclaimed October as Italian-American Heritage and Culture Month for 1990 (Pub. L. 101–460) and 1993/1994 (Pub. L. 103–309).

Within the authority of the Executive Branch, the President of the United States has also issued a proclamation in 1989 and 1990 by George H. W. Bush, in 1993 by Bill Clinton, and in 2010 by Barack Obama.

Most recently, President Joe Biden proclaimed on Columbus Day 2022 that the voyages of Christopher Columbus served as “a source of pride for many Italian Americans whose families also crossed the Atlantic.”

== See also ==
- List of Italian Americans
