= May =

Fifth month in the Julian and Gregorian calendars

<<	May					>>
Su	Mo	Tu	We	Th	Fr	Sa
					1	2
3	4	5	6	7	8	9
10	11	12	13	14	15	16
17	18	19	20	21	22	23
24	25	26	27	28	29	30
31
2026

May is the fifth month of the year in the Julian and Gregorian calendars. Its length is 31 days.

May is a month of spring in the Northern Hemisphere, and autumn in the Southern Hemisphere. Therefore, May in the Southern Hemisphere is the seasonal equivalent of November in the Northern Hemisphere and vice versa. Late May typically marks the start of the summer vacation season in the United States (Memorial Day) and Canada (Victoria Day) that ends on Labor Day, the first Monday of September.

May (in Latin, Maius) was named for the Greek goddess Maia, who was identified with the Roman era goddess of fertility, Bona Dea, whose festival was held in May. Conversely, the Roman poet Ovid provides a second etymology, in which he says that the month of May is named for the maiores, Latin for "elders", and that the following month (June) is named for the iuniores, or "young people" (Fasti VI.88).

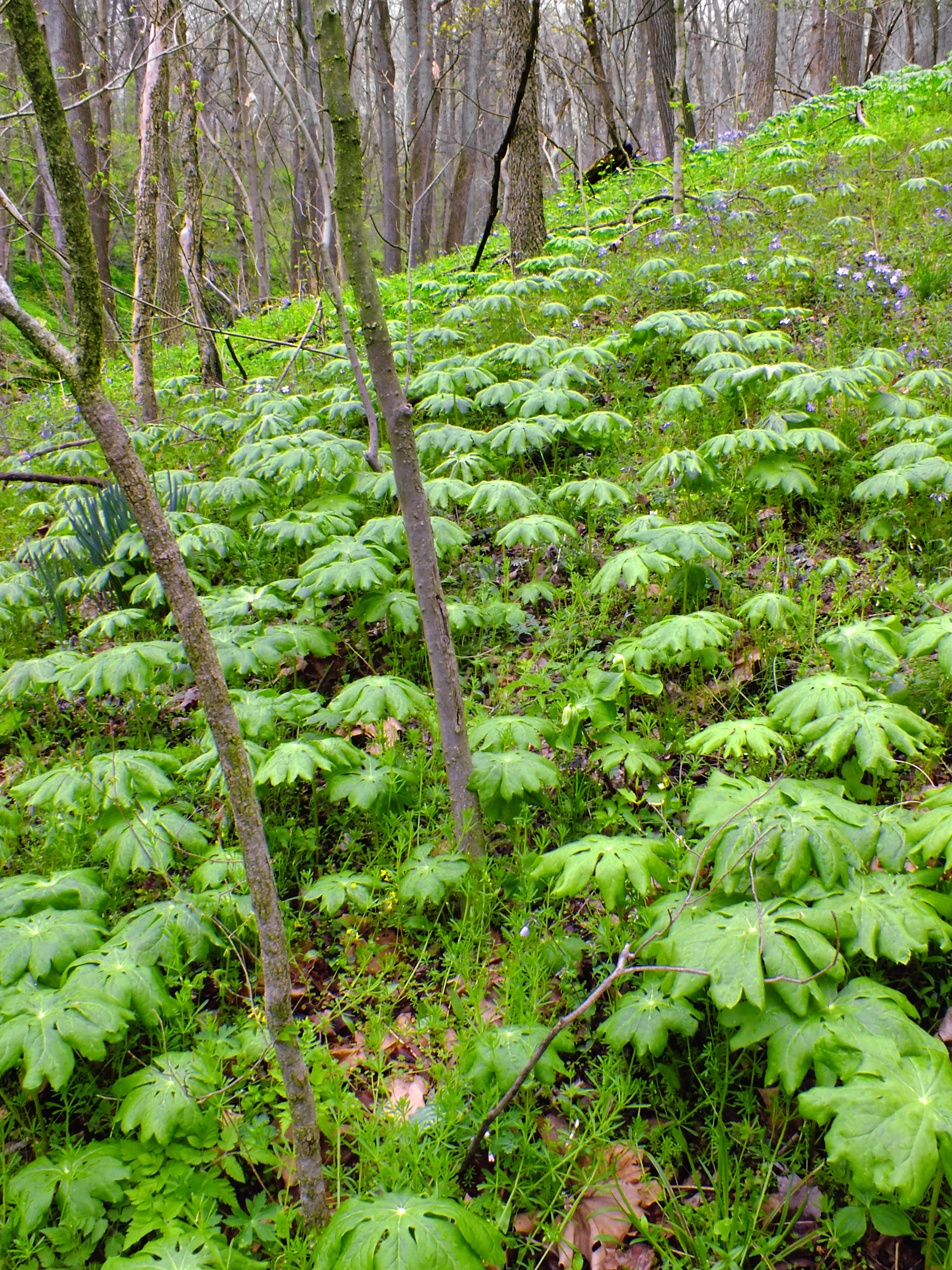
May apples blooming. Common name given due to the plant's tendency to bloom in the month of May.

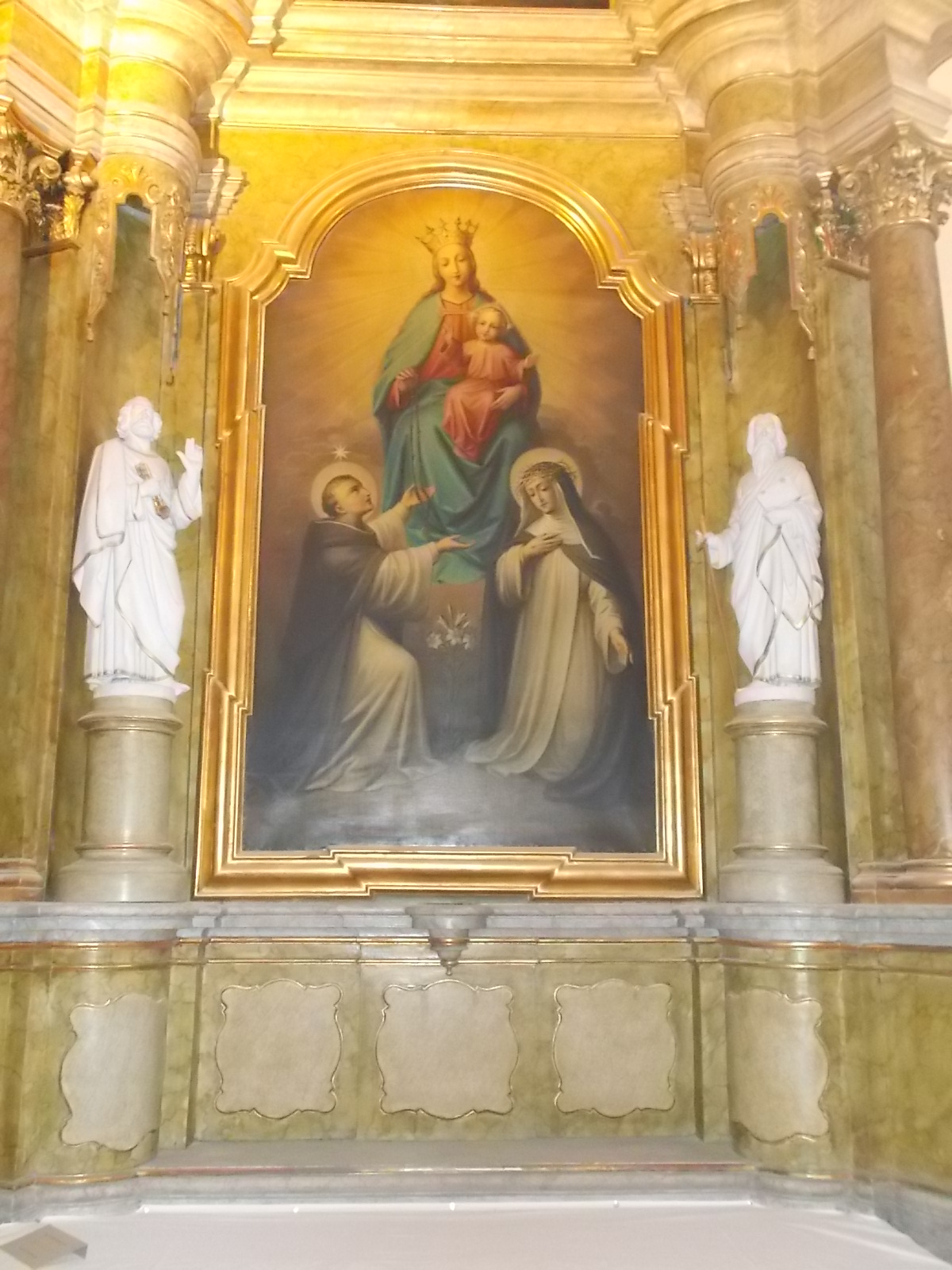
Special devotions to the Blessed Virgin Mary take place in May.

In recent decades, the number of warm temperature records in May has outpaced cold temperature records over a growing portion of Earth's surface.

Chart showing changes in global average temperature annually in May of each year

Eta Aquariids meteor shower appears in May. It is visible from about April 23 to about May 20 each year with peak activity on or around May 6. The Arietids shower from May 22 to July 2, and peaks on June 7. The Virginids also shower at various dates in May.

== Ancient Roman observances ==
Under the calendar of ancient Rome, the festival of Bona Dea fell on May 1, Argei fell on May 14 or May 15, Agonalia fell on May 21, and Ambarvalia on May 29. Floralia was held April 27 during the Republican era, or April 28 on the Julian calendar, and lasted until May 3. Lemuria fell on 9,11, and 13 May under the Julian calendar. The College of Aesculapius and Hygia celebrated two festivals of Rosalia, one on May 11 and one on May 22. Rosalia was also celebrated at Pergamon on May 24–26. A military Rosalia festival, Rosaliae signorum, also occurred on May 31. Ludi Fabarici was celebrated May 29 – June 1. Mercury would receive a sacrifice on the Ides of May (May 15). Tubilustrium took place on May 23 as well as in March. These dates do not correspond to the modern Gregorian calendar.

== Symbols ==
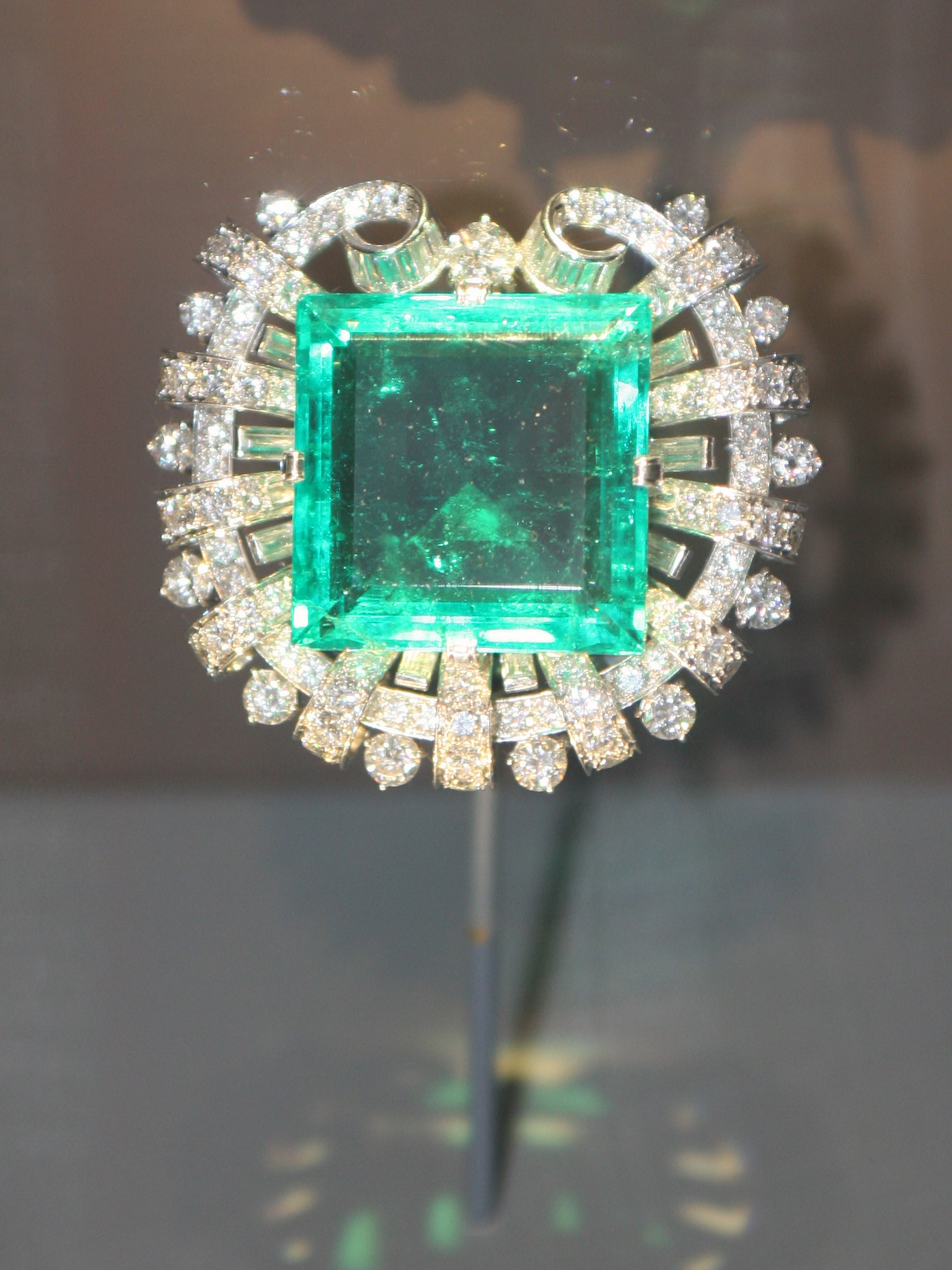
Emerald brooch

May's birthstone is the emerald, which is emblematic of love and success. Birth flowers are the Lily of the Valley and Crataegus monogyna. Both are native throughout the cool temperate Northern Hemisphere in Asia, Europe, and in the southern Appalachian Mountains in the United States, but have been naturalized throughout the temperate climatic world.

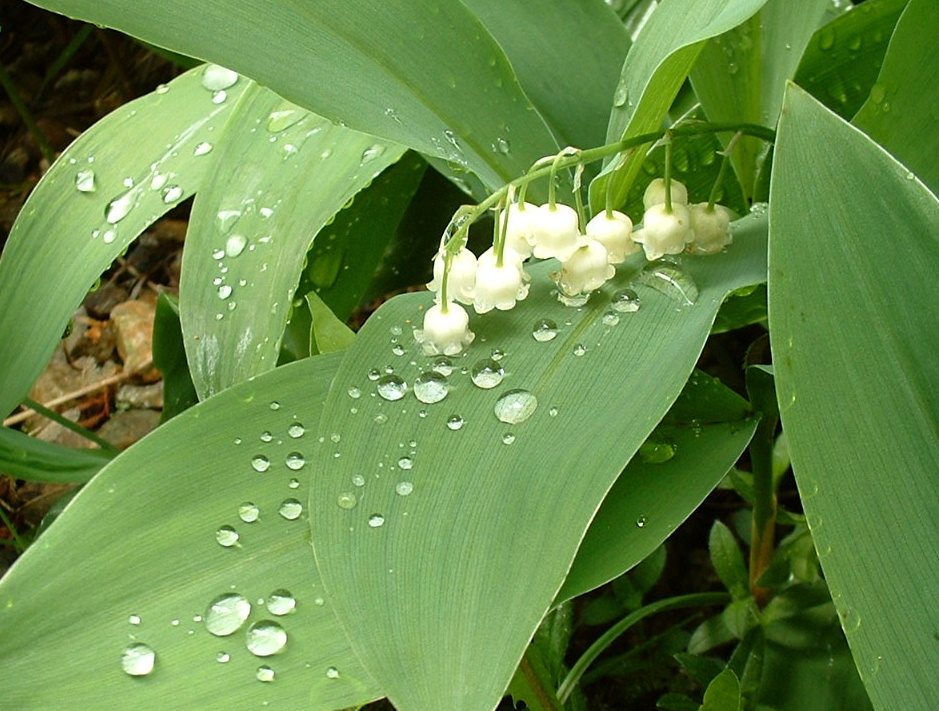
The Lily of the Valley

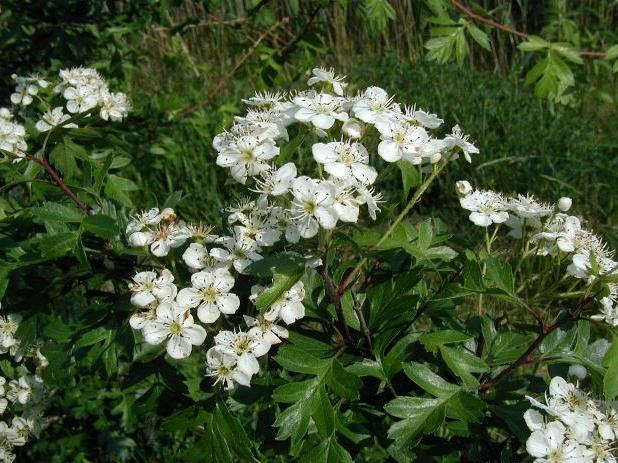
Crataegus monogyna

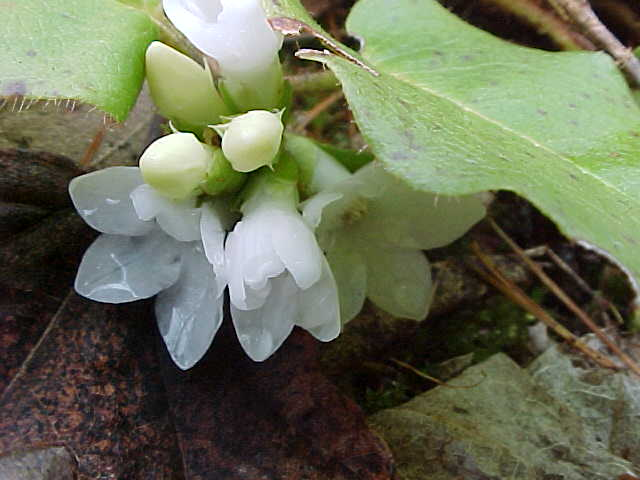
Mayflowers

The "Mayflower" Epigaea repens is a North American harbinger of May, and the floral emblem of both Nova Scotia and Massachusetts. Its native range extends from Newfoundland south to Florida, west to Kentucky in the southern range, and to Northwest Territories in the north. The zodiac signs are Taurus (until May 20) and Gemini (May 21 onward).

== Observances ==
=== Month-long ===
- Working class history month
- Better Hearing and Speech Month
- In Catholic tradition, May is the Month of the Blessed Virgin Mary. See May devotions to the Blessed Virgin Mary
  - Flores de Mayo (Philippines)
- Borderline personality disorder awareness month
- Celiac Awareness Month
- Cystic Fibrosis Awareness Month
- Ehlers–Danlos Syndrome Awareness month
- Garden for Wildlife month
- Huntington's Disease Awareness Month (International)
- International Mediterranean Diet Month
- Kaamatan harvest festival (Labuan, Sabah)
- New Zealand Music Month (New Zealand)
- National Pet Month (United Kingdom)
- National Smile Month (United Kingdom)
- Season of Emancipation (April 14 to August 23) (Barbados)
- Skin Cancer Awareness Month
- South Asian Heritage Month (International)
- World Trade Month

==== United States ====
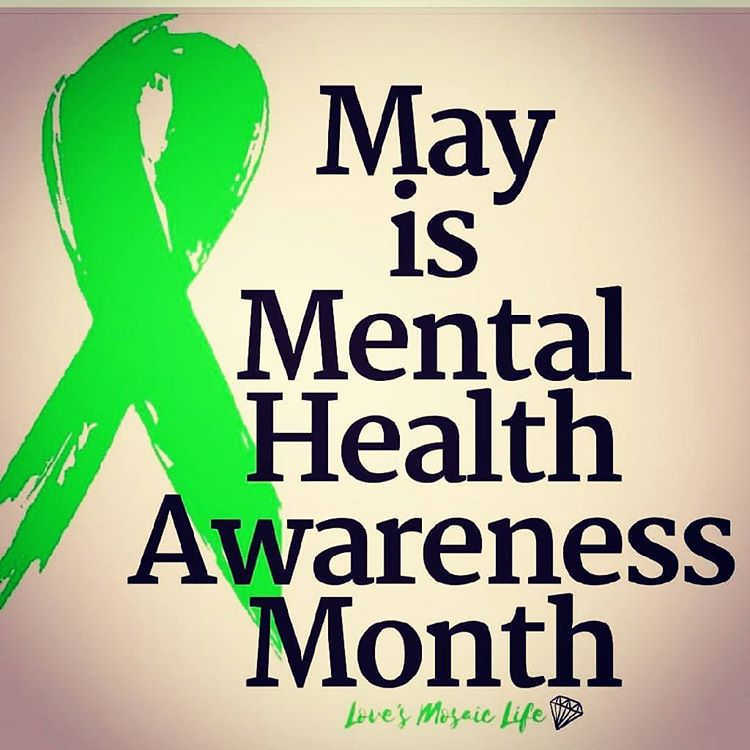
The green ribbon is the international symbol of mental health awareness.

- Asian American and Pacific Islander Heritage Month
- National ALS Awareness Month
- Bicycle Month
- National Brain Tumor Awareness Month
- National Burger Month
- Community Action Awareness Month (North Dakota)
- National Electrical Safety Month
- National Foster Care Month
- National Golf Month
- Jewish American Heritage Month
- Haitian Heritage Month
- Hepatitis Awareness Month
- Mental Health Awareness Month
- National Military Appreciation Month
- National Moving Month
- National Osteoporosis Month
- National Stroke Awareness Month
- National Water Safety Month
- Older Americans Month

=== Non-Gregorian ===
(All Baha'i, Islamic, and Jewish observances begin at the sundown prior to the date listed, and end at sundown of the date in question unless otherwise noted.)

- List of observances set by the Bahá'í calendar
- List of observances set by the Chinese calendar
- List of observances set by the Hebrew calendar
- List of observances set by the Islamic calendar
- List of observances set by the Solar Hijri calendar

=== Movable ===
- Phi Ta Khon (Dan Sai, Loei province, Isan, Thailand) Dates are selected by village mediums and can take place anywhere between March and July.
- National Small Business Week (United States): May 5–11
- National Hurricane Preparedness Week (United States): May 5–11
- New Zealand Sign Language Week: May 6–12
- Green Office Week (Britain, United States): May 13–17
- Walk Safely to School Day (Australia): May 17
- Emergency Medical Services Week (United States): May 19–25
- Bike to Work Week Victoria (May 27 – June 2)

==== Western Christian ====
- Special devotions to the Virgin Mary take place in May. See May devotions to the Blessed Virgin Mary.

Labour Day: May 1

- International Workers' Day

Sunday after Divine Mercy Sunday: May 5

- Jubilate Sunday

Monday and Tuesday in the week following the third Sunday of Easter: May 6–7

- Hocktide (England)

Fourth Sunday after Easter: May 12

- Cantate Sunday
- Good Shepherd Sunday

Fourth Friday after Easter: May 17

- Store Bededag (Denmark)

Third Sunday of May: May 19

- Feast of Our Lady of the Audience

Sunday preceding the Rogation days: May 26

- Rogation Sunday

Monday, Tuesday, and Wednesday preceding Feast of the Ascension: May 27–29

- Minor Rogation days

39 days after Easter: May 30

- Feast of the Ascension
  - Father's Day (Germany)
  - Festa della Sensa (Venice)
  - Global Day of Prayer
  - Sheep Festival (Cameroon)

==== Eastern Christian ====
Wednesday after Pascha: May 1

- Bright Wednesday

Thursday after Pascha: May 2

- Bright Thursday

Friday after Pascha: May 3

- Bright Friday

Saturday after Pascha: May 4

- Bright Saturday

8th day after Pascha: May 5

- Thomas Sunday

2nd Tuesday of Pascha, or 2nd Monday of Pascha, depending on region: May 6 or May 7

- Radonitsa (Russian Orthodox)

2nd Sunday following Pascha: May 12

- Sunday of the Myrrhbearers

4th Sunday of Pascha: May 26

- Sunday of the Paralytic

Wednesday after the Sunday of the Paralytic: May 29

- Mid-Pentecost

=== Movable civic ===
==== Last Friday in April to the first Sunday in May ====
- National Arbour Week (Ontario, Canada)

==== First Thursday ====
- Arbour Day (Nova Scotia, Canada)
- National Day of Prayer (United States)
- National Day of Reason (United States)

==== First Saturday ====
- Kentucky Derby
- Free Comic Book Day
- Green Up Day (Vermont, United States)
- World Naked Gardening Day

===== First Sunday =====
- Mother's Day (Angola, Cape Verde, Hungary, Lithuania, Mozambique, Portugal, Spain)
- World Laughter Day
- Children's Day (South Korea)

==== First full week ====
- National Teacher Appreciation Week (United States)
- North American Occupational Safety and Health Week

===== Tuesday of First full week =====
- National Teacher Appreciation Day (United States)

===== Wednesday of first full week =====
- Occupational Safety and Health Professional Day

==== Second week in May ====
- National Stuttering Awareness Week (United States)

==== First Tuesday ====
- World Asthma Day

==== Friday preceding Second Sunday in May ====
- Military Spouse Day (United States)
- National Public Gardens Day (United States)

==== Saturday closest to May 10 ====
- National Train Day (United States)

==== Second Saturday ====
- International Migratory Bird Day (Canada, the United States, Mexico, Central and South America, and the Caribbean)
- National Tree Planting Day (Mongolia)
- National Train Day

==== Second Weekend ====
- National Mills Weekend (United Kingdom)
- World Migratory Bird Day

==== Second Sunday ====
- National Nursing Home Week (United States)
- Children's Day (Spain)
- Father's Day (Romania)
- Mother's Day (Anguilla, Aruba, Australia, Austria, Bahamas, Barbados, Bangladesh, Belgium, Belize, Bermuda, Bonaire, Brazil, Brunei, Canada, Chile, Colombia, Cuba, Croatia, Curaçao, Czech Republic, Denmark, Ecuador, Estonia, Finland, Germany, Greece, Grenada, Honduras, Hong Kong, Iceland, India, Italy, Jamaica, Japan, Latvia, Malta, Malaysia, the Netherlands, New Zealand, Pakistan, Peru, Philippines, Puerto Rico, Singapore, Slovakia, South Africa, Suriname, Switzerland, Taiwan, Trinidad and Tobago, Turkey, United States, Uruguay, Venezuela, Zimbabwe)
- State Flag and State Emblem Day (Belarus)
- World Fair Trade Day

==== Week of May 12 ====
- National Nursing Week (United States)

==== Third Weekend, including Friday ====
- Sanja Matsuri (Tokyo, Japan)

==== Third Friday ====
- Arbour Day (Prince Edward Island, Canada)
- National Defense Transportation Day
- Endangered Species Day (United States)
- National Pizza Party Day (United States)

==== Third Saturday ====
- The Preakness Stakes is run, second jewel in the triple crown of horse racing.
- Armed Forces Day (United States)
- Culture Freedom Day
- Sanja Matsuri
- World Whisky Day

==== Third Sunday ====
- Commemoration Day of Fallen Soldiers
- Father's Day (Tonga)
- Feast of Our Lady of the Audience
- Sanja Matsuri (Tokyo, Japan)

==== Monday on or before May 24 ====
- Victoria Day (Scotland)

==== Third Monday ====
- Discovery Day (Cayman Islands)

==== Monday on or before May 25 ====
- National Patriots' Day (Quebec)

==== Last Monday preceding May 25 ====
- Victoria Day (Canada)

==== May 24, or the nearest weekday if May 24 falls on a weekend ====
- Bermuda Day (Bermuda)

==== Saturday closest to May 30 ====
- Armed Forces Day (Spain)

==== Last Weekend ====
- Kyiv Day (Kyiv)

==== Last Sunday ====
- Arbor Day (Venezuela)
- Children's Day (Hungary)
- Mother's Day (Algeria, Dominican Republic, Haiti, Mauritius, Morocco, Sweden, Tunisia)
- Turkmen Carpet Day (Turkmenistan)

==== Last Monday ====
- Heroes' Day (Turks and Caicos Islands)
- Memorial Day (United States), a public holiday, is on May 30, but observed on the last Monday in May.
- Ratu Sir Lala Sukuna Day (Fiji), removed as a national holiday in 2010.

==== Last Wednesday ====
- World Multiple Sclerosis Day

==== Last Thursday ====
- Take a Girl Child to Work Day (South Africa)

=== Fixed ===
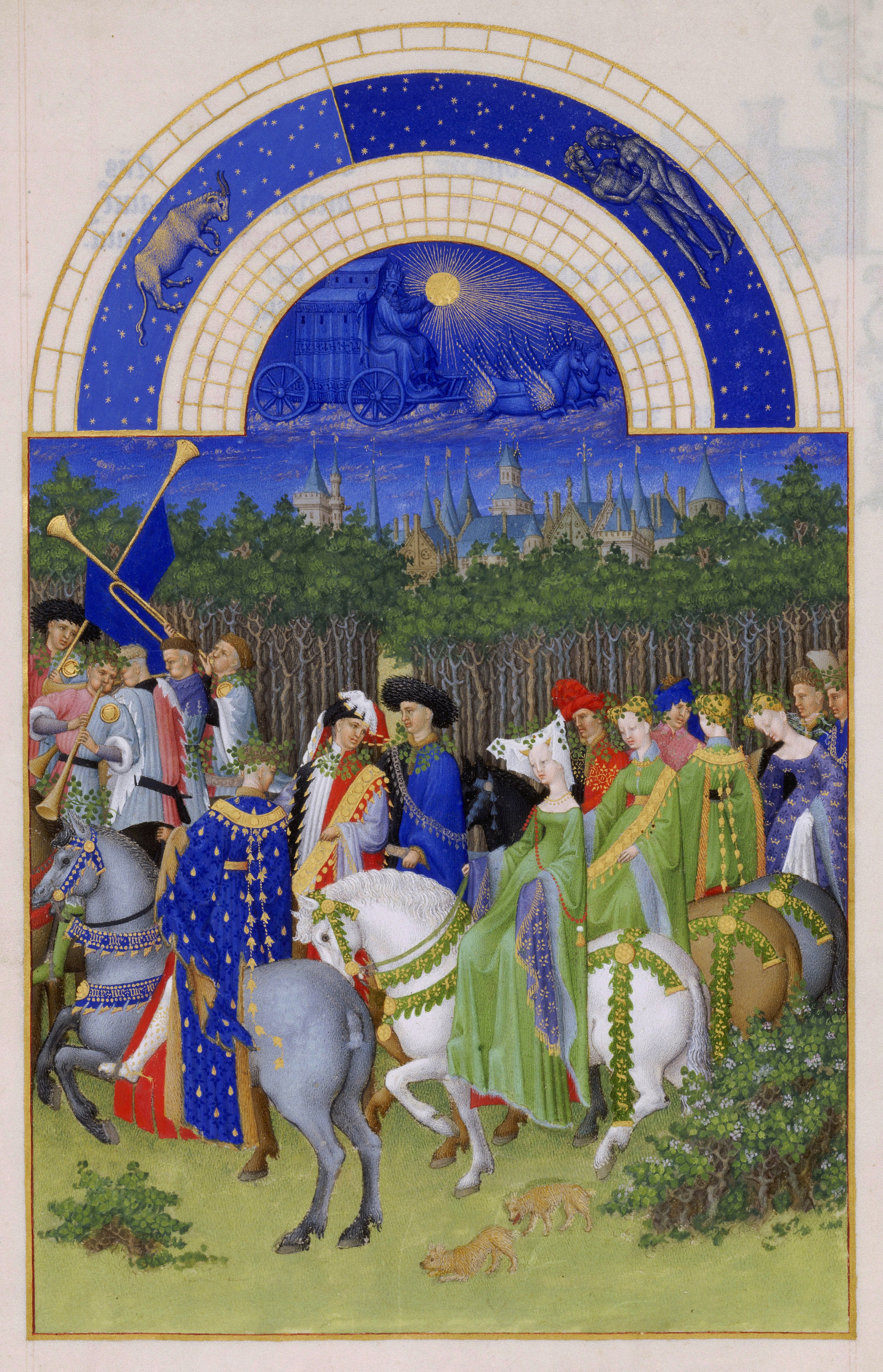
May, from the Très Riches Heures du Duc de Berry

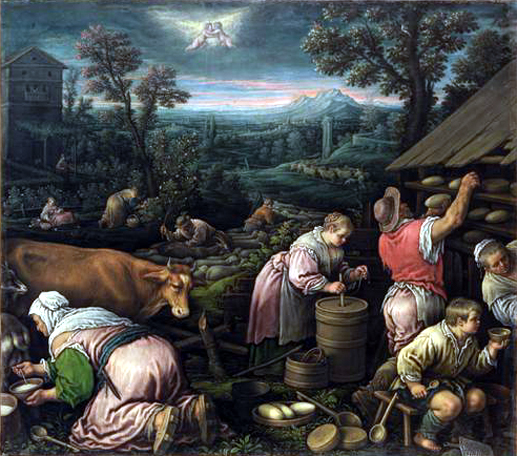
May, Leandro Bassano

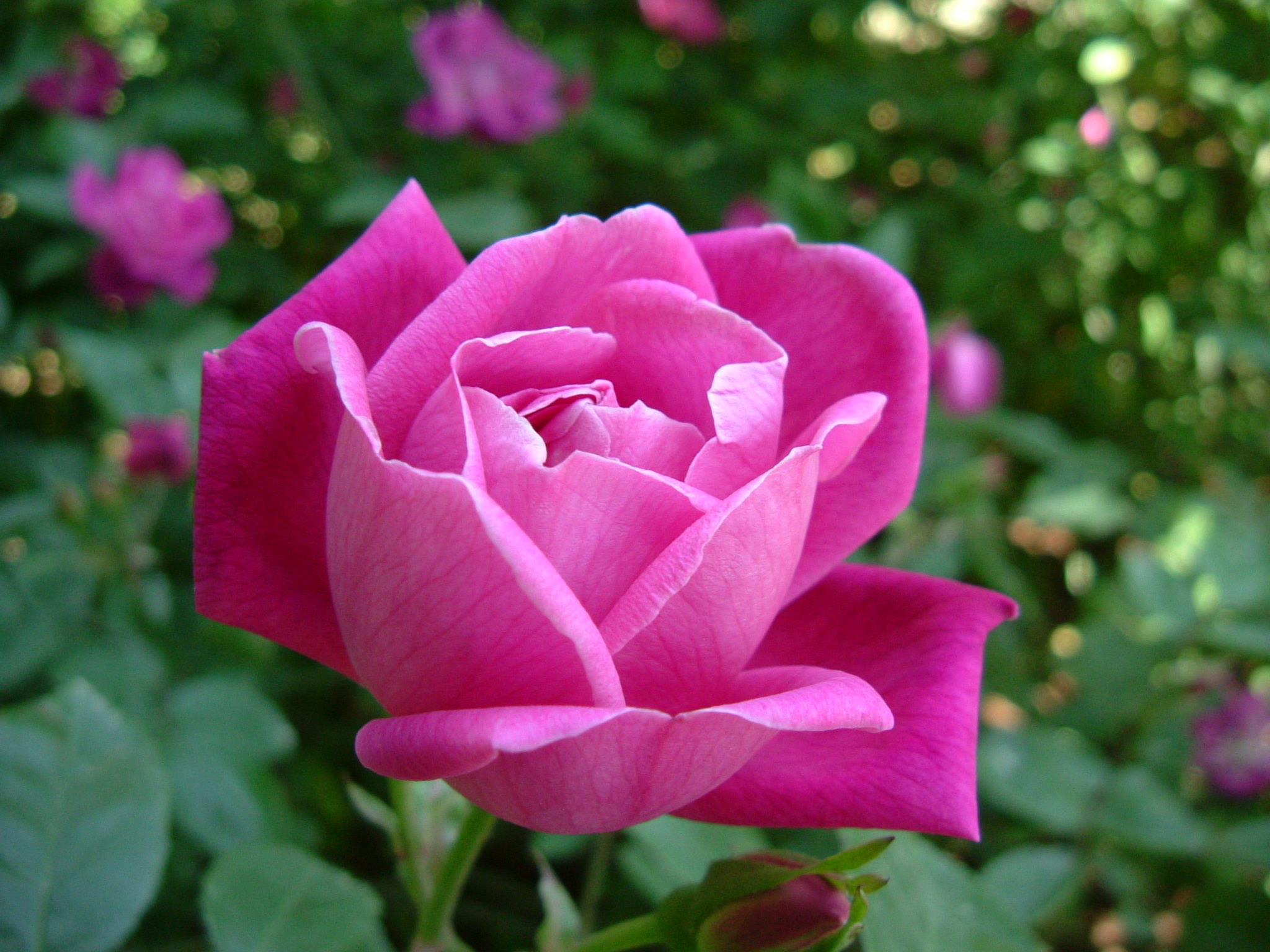
Rosa chinensis, the flower symbol of May

- April 29 to May 5 in Japan, which includes four different holidays, is called "Golden Week". Many workers have up to 10 days off. There is also 'May sickness', where new students or workers start to be tired of their new routine. (In Japan the school year and fiscal year start on April 1.)
- Mayovka, in the context of the late Russian Empire, was a picnic in the countryside or in a park in the early days of May, hence the name. Eventually, "mayovka" (specifically, "proletarian mayovka") came to mean an illegal celebration of May 1 by revolutionary public, typically presented as an innocent picnic.
- May 1
  - Armed Forces Day (Mauritania)
  - Beltane (Ireland, Neopaganism)
  - Constitution Day (Argentina)
  - Lei Day (Hawaii, United States)
  - May Day (International observance)
- May 2
  - Anniversary of the Dos de Mayo Uprising (Community of Madrid, Spain)
  - Birth Anniversary of Third Druk Gyalpo (Bhutan)
  - Flag Day (Poland)
  - Indonesia National Education Day
- May 3
  - Constitution Day (Poland)
  - Constitution Memorial Day (Japan)
  - Roodmas
  - Sun Day (International)
  - World Press Freedom Day
- May 4
  - Anti-Bullying Day (United Nations)
  - Bird Day (United States)
  - Cassinga Day (Namibia)
  - Death of Milan Rastislav Štefánik Day (Slovakia)
  - Greenery Day (Japan)
  - International Firefighters' Day
  - May Fourth Movement commemorations:
    - Literary Day (Taiwan)
    - Youth Day (China)
  - Remembrance Day for Martyrs and Disabled (Afghanistan)
  - Remembrance of the Dead (Netherlands)
  - Restoration of Independence day (Latvia)
  - Star Wars Day (International observance)
  - World Give Day
  - Youth Day (Fiji)
- May 5
  - Children's Day (Japan, Korea)
  - Cinco de Mayo
  - Constitution Day (Kyrgyzstan)
  - Coronation Day (Thailand)
  - Europe Day in Europe (uncommon usage, largely replaced by May 9).
  - Feast of al-Khadr or Saint George (Palestinian people)
  - Indian Arrival Day (Guyana)
  - International Midwives' Day
  - Liberation Day (Denmark)
  - Liberation Day (Netherlands)
  - Lusophone Culture Day (Community of Portuguese Language Countries)
  - Martyrs' Day (Albania)
  - Patriots' Victory Day (Ethiopia)
  - Senior Citizens Day (Palau)
  - Tango no sekku (Japan)
- May 6
  - Martyrs' Day (Gabon)
  - Martyrs' Day (Lebanon and Syria)
  - International No Diet Day
  - Teachers' Day (Jamaica)
  - The first day of Hıdırellez (Turkey)
  - St George's Day related observances (Eastern Orthodox Church):
    - Day of Bravery, also known as Gergyovden (Bulgaria)
    - Đurđevdan (Gorani, Roma)
    - Police Day (Georgia)
    - Yuri's Day (Russian Orthodox Church)
- May 7
  - Defender of the Fatherland Day (Kazakhstan)
  - Dien Bien Phu Victory Day (Vietnam)
  - Radio Day (Russia, Bulgaria)
- May 8
  - Miguel Hidalgo's birthday (Mexico)
  - Parents' Day (South Korea)
  - Time of Remembrance and Reconciliation for Those Who Lost Their Lives during the Second World War, continues to May 9
  - Truman Day (Missouri, United States)
  - White Lotus Day (Theosophy)
  - World Red Cross and Red Crescent Day
  - Veterans Day (Norway)
  - VE Day in Western Europe. In Eastern Europe it is celebrated on May 9.
- May 9
  - Anniversary of Dianetics (Church of Scientology)
  - Europe Day (European Union)
  - Liberation Day (Guernsey), commemorating the end of the German occupation of the Channel Islands during World War II.
  - Liberation Day (Jersey), commemorating the end of the German occupation of the Channel Islands during World War II.
  - Time of Remembrance and Reconciliation for Those Who Lost Their Lives during the Second World War, continued from May 8.
  - Victory Day observances, celebration of the Soviet Union victory over Nazi Germany (Soviet Union, Azerbaijan, Belarus, Bosnia and Herzegovina, Georgia, Israel, Kazakhstan, Kyrgyzstan, Moldova, Russia, Serbia, Tajikistan, Turkmenistan, Uzbekistan)
  - Victory Day over Nazism in World War II (Ukraine)
  - Victory and Peace Day (Armenia) marks both the capture of Shusha (1992) in the First Nagorno-Karabakh War, and the end of World War II.
- May 10
  - Children's Day (Maldives)
  - Confederate Memorial Day (North Carolina and South Carolina)
  - Constitution Day (Federated States of Micronesia)
  - Golden Spike Day (1869 – Completion of the First transcontinental railroad – Promontory Summit, Utah)
  - Independence Day (Romania), celebrating the declaration of independence of Romania from the Ottoman Empire in 1877.
  - Liberation Day (Sark), commemorating the end of the German occupation of the Channel Islands during World War II.
- May 11
  - National Technology Day (India)
  - Statehood Day (Minnesota)
  - Vietnam Human Rights Day (Vietnam)
- May 12
  - Saint Andrea the First Day (Georgia (country))
  - Day of the Finnish Identity (Finland)
  - International Myalgic Encephalomyelitis/Chronic Fatigue Syndrome Awareness Day
  - International Nurses Day
- May 13
  - Abbotsbury Garland Day (Dorset, England)
  - Heroes' Day (Romania)
  - Rotuma Day (Rotuma, Fiji)
- May 14
  - Hastings Banda's Birthday (Malawi)
  - First day of Izumo-taisha Shrine Grand Festival. (Izumo-taisha, Japan)
  - National Unification Day (Liberia)
- May 15
  - Beginning of Tourette Syndrome awareness month. It ends on June 15
  - Army Day (Slovenia)
  - Constituent Assembly Day (Lithuania)
  - Independence Day (Paraguay)
  - International Day of Families
  - Nakba Day (Palestinian communities)
  - Peace Officers Memorial Day (United States)
  - Republic Day (Lithuania)
  - Saint Ubaldo Day
  - Teachers' Day (Colombia, Mexico, South Korea)
- May 16
  - Martyrs of Sudan (Episcopal Church (USA))
  - St Brendan Birthday & Feast day
  - Mass Graves Day (Iraq)
  - National Day, declared by Salva Kiir (South Sudan)
  - Teachers' Day (Malaysia)
  - International Day of Light
- May 17
  - National Day Against Homophobia (Canada)
  - International Day Against Homophobia, Transphobia and Biphobia, also known as IDAHOT
  - Birthday of the Raja (Perlis)
  - Children's Day (Norway)
  - Constitution Day (Nauru)
  - Galician Literature Day (Galicia (Spain))
  - World Hypertension Day
  - World Information Society Day
  - Liberation Day (Democratic Republic of the Congo)
  - Navy Day (Argentina)
  - Norwegian Constitution Day
- May 18
  - Baltic Fleet Day (Russia)
  - Battle of Las Piedras Day (Uruguay)
  - Day of Remembrance of Crimean Tatar genocide (Ukraine)
  - Flag and Universities Day (Haiti)
  - Independence Day (Somaliland) (unrecognized)
  - International Museum Day
  - Mullivaikkal Remembrance Day (Sri Lankan Tamils)
  - Revival, Unity, and Poetry of Magtymguly Day (Turkmenistan)
  - Teacher's Day (Syria)
  - Victory Day (Sri Lanka)
  - World AIDS Vaccine Day
- May 19
  - Commemoration of Atatürk, Youth and Sports Day (Turkey, Northern Cyprus)
  - Greek Genocide Remembrance Day (Greece)
  - Hồ Chí Minh's Birthday (Vietnam)
  - Malcolm X Day (United States of America)
  - National Asian & Pacific Islander HIV/AIDS Awareness Day
  - Hepatitis Testing Day (United States)
- May 20
  - Day of Remembrance (Cambodia)
  - Emancipation Day (Florida)
  - European Maritime Day (European Council)
  - Independence Day (Cuba)
  - Independence Day, East Timor
  - Josephine Baker Day (NAACP)
  - National Awakening Day (Indonesia)
  - National Day (Cameroon)
  - World Metrology Day
- May 21
  - Afro-Colombian Day (Colombia)
  - Circassian Day of Mourning (Circassians)
  - Day of Patriots and Military (Hungary)
  - Navy Day (Chile)
  - Saint Helena Day, celebrates the discovery of Saint Helena in 1502.
  - World Day for Cultural Diversity for Dialogue and Development (International)
  - One of the three festivals of Vejovis (Roman Empire)
- May 22
  - Abolition Day (Martinique)
  - Harvey Milk Day (California)
  - International Day for Biological Diversity (International)
  - National Maritime Day (United States)
  - National Sovereignty Day (Haiti)
  - Republic Day (Sri Lanka)
  - Translation of the Relics of Saint Nicholas from Myra to Bari (Ukraine)
  - Unity Day (Yemen)
  - World Goth Day
- May 23
  - Constitution Day (Germany)
  - Labour Day (Jamaica)
  - Students' Day (Mexico)
  - World Turtle Day
- May 24
  - Feast of Mary Help of Christians (Roman Catholicism)
  - Aldersgate Day/Wesley Day (Methodism)
  - Battle of Pichincha Day (Ecuador)
  - Commonwealth Day (Belize)
  - Independence Day (Eritrea)
  - Lubiri Memorial Day (Buganda)
  - Saints Cyril and Methodius Day (Eastern Orthodox Church) and its related observance:
    - Bulgarian Education and Culture and Slavonic Literature Day (Bulgaria)
    - Saints Cyril and Methodius, Slavonic Enlighteners' Day (North Macedonia)
- May 25
  - Africa Day (African Union)
  - African Liberation Day (African Union)
  - Day of Youth
  - Geek Pride Day
  - Independence Day (Jordan)
  - Liberation Day (Lebanon)
  - May Revolution (or Revolución de Mayo), a national holiday in Argentina
  - International Missing Children's Day
  - Last bell (Russia, post-Soviet countries)
  - Liberation Day (Lebanon)
  - National Day (Argentina)
  - National Missing Children's Day (United States)
  - National Tap Dance Day (United States)
  - Towel Day
- May 26
  - Crown Prince's Birthday (Denmark)
  - Independence Day (Guyana)
  - Independence Day (Georgia)
  - Mother's Day (Poland)
  - National Day of Healing (Australia)
  - National Paper Airplane Day (United States)
- May 27
  - Armed Forces Day (Nicaragua)
  - Children's Day (Nigeria)
  - Mother's Day (Bolivia)
  - Navy Day (Japan)
  - Slavery Abolition Day (Guadeloupe, Saint Barthélemy, Saint Martin)
  - World MS Day
  - Start of National Reconciliation Week (Australia)
- May 28
  - Armed Forces Day (Croatia)
  - Downfall of the Derg Day (Ethiopia)
  - Flag Day (Philippines) (Display of the flag in all places until June 12 is encouraged)
  - Independence Day (Armenia)
  - Republic Day (Nepal)
  - TDFR Republic Day
  - Youm-e-Takbir (Pakistan)
- May 29
  - Army Day (Argentina)
  - International Day of United Nations Peacekeepers (International)
  - Oak Apple Day (England), and its related observance:
    - Castleton Garland Day (Castleton)
  - Statehood Day (Rhode Island and Wisconsin)
  - Veterans Day (Sweden)
  - World Digestive Health Day
- May 30
  - Anguilla Day (Anguilla)
  - Canary Islands Day (Spain)
  - Indian Arrival Day (Trinidad and Tobago)
  - Lod Massacre Remembrance Day (Puerto Rico)
  - Mother's Day (Nicaragua)
  - Parliament Day (Croatia)
- May 31
  - Anniversary of Royal Brunei Malay Regiment (Brunei)
  - Castile–La Mancha Day (Castile-La Mancha)
  - Visitation of Mary (Western Christianity)
  - World No Tobacco Day (International)

== See also ==
- List of historical anniversaries
