= Haitian Flag Day =

Haitian holiday

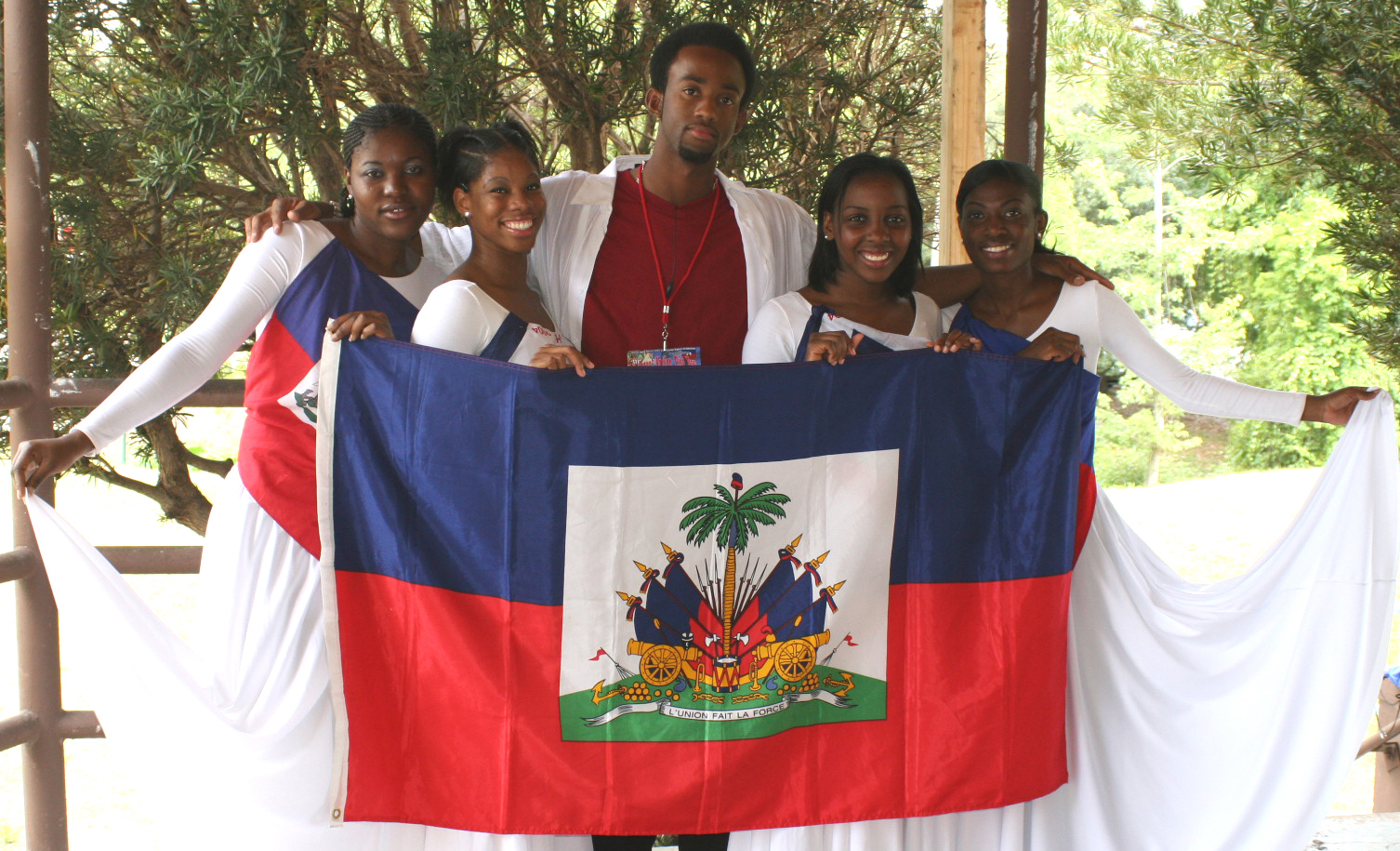
- Motown Maurice and members of the University of South Florida Total Praise dance group, at the 2006 Tampa Haitian Flag Day Festival
- Observed by: Haitians
- Date: 18 May
- First time: 18 May 2002; 24 years ago
- Started by: Haitian-American Carnival Association

Haitian Flag Day (Haitian Creole: Jounen Drapo Ayisyen; French: La fête du drapeau haïtien) is a Haitian public holiday celebrating the creation of the flag of Haiti during the Haitian Revolution. The day is celebrated each year on 18 May, which is the anniversary of the date of the flag's adoption in 1803. The day is observed officially in Haiti, as well as in numerous cities of the United States that have a large Haitian population.

== Observance ==
The day is observed and celebrated by Haitians living in and outside of Haiti. The grounds of the national palace in Haiti are the center of celebrations in the country. Whereas, Haitian residing in other countries honor the flag and the struggle that it symbolizes. Every year, on the last Sunday of May, a Haitian Day Parade is organized that goes down the Toussaint Louverture Boulevard (also known as Nostrand Avenue) in New York City. The parade was started by the Haitian-American Carnival Association in 2002 and is followed by a festival celebrating the Haitian culture, including its music and food.

Other cities that observe the celebrations include Boston which commemorates the struggles during the Haitian Heritage Month in May each year. Floridian cities such as Miami, Tampa, Delray Beach, Fort Lauderdale, and Fort Myers also have events that promote the Haitian culture. Miami's MOCA Plaza celebrations are famous for featuring prominent Haitian-American celebrities, artists, musicians, entertainers, and political personalities.

The celebrations for the Haitian Flag Day in 2020 were cancelled in all parts of the world where it is celebrated due to the lockdown imposed because of the COVID-19 pandemic. A limited amount of celebrations were done in different cities, such as Norwich, Connecticut, opting for just a flag raising instead of its annual festival.
