= CSSE =

CSSE can refer to:

- The Canadian Society of Safety Engineering
- Center for Systems Science and Engineering at Johns Hopkins University
- Chicken Soup for the Soul Entertainment (Nasdaq: CSSE), former American mass media company
- Computer Science and Software Engineering, a designation used at some universities for the department of the same name
- The Consortium for Selective Schools in Essex
