= Board of Canadian Registered Safety Professionals =

- Founded: February 10, 1976
- Type: not-for-profit association
- Purpose: A global leader in the certification of occupational health and safety professionals
- Headquarters: 6700 Century Ave., Suite 100, Mississauga, Ontario L5N 6A4
- Location: Canada
- Members: 6,000+ (certificants)
- Official language: English and French
- Website: BCRSP

The Board of Canadian Registered Safety Professionals (BCRSP) provides certification of occupational health and safety professionals in Canada and has an established Code of Ethics.

== History ==
The organization was formerly the Association for Canadian Registered Safety Professionals. The BCRSP is a public interest, not-for-profit, ISO 17024 accredited and ISO 9001 certified organization and deals with the principles of health and safety as a profession in Canada. The first Board of Governors was composed of 15 professionals from a cross-section of safety disciplines. The BCRSP has certified over 8000 individuals since its incorporation in 1976.

== Formation ==
The Canadian Society of Safety Engineering's Education & Research Committee reported a need for a generalist certification for Occupational Health and Safety (OH&S) practitioners. In November 1974, a steering committee was formed to implement recommendations and establish the first Board of Governors. A meeting was held March 3, 1975 and the proposed name was Canadian Registered Safety Professional. Consumer and Corporate Affairs issued a Letters Patent on February 10, 1976

== Certification ==
The BCRSP grants the Canadian Registered Safety Professional (CRSP)/Professionnel en sécurité agréé du Canada (PSAC) and Canadian Registered Safety Technician (CRST)/Technicien en sécurité agréé du Canada (TSAC) certifications to individuals who successfully complete the certification process through application assessment, interview and examination.

BCRSP has Memoranda of Understanding (MOUs) with the Board of Certified Safety Professionals (USA) the Institute for Occupational Safety and Health (UK) the Australian Institute of Health and Safety, and NEBOSH.

== Memberships and Affiliations ==
The BCRSP has a membership with the Canadian Network of National Associations of Regulators (CNAR)., the Institute for Credentialing Excellence (ICE) and the International Network of Safety & Health Practitioner Organisations (INSHPO).

The Canadian Society of Safety Engineering established a collaboration agreement with the BCRSP on May 5, 2014. BCRSP also has strategic partnerships with the Canadian Association for Black Health and Safety Professionals (CABHSP), the Canadian Registration Board of Occupational Hygienists (CRBOH), and the Women in Occupational Health and Safety Society (WOHSS).

== See also ==
- Institute for Credentialing Excellence (ICE)
- Canadian Society of Safety Engineering
- Standards Council of Canada
- BSI Group
- National Institute for Occupational Safety and Health - American
