= Rainer Arnold =

German politician (born 1950)

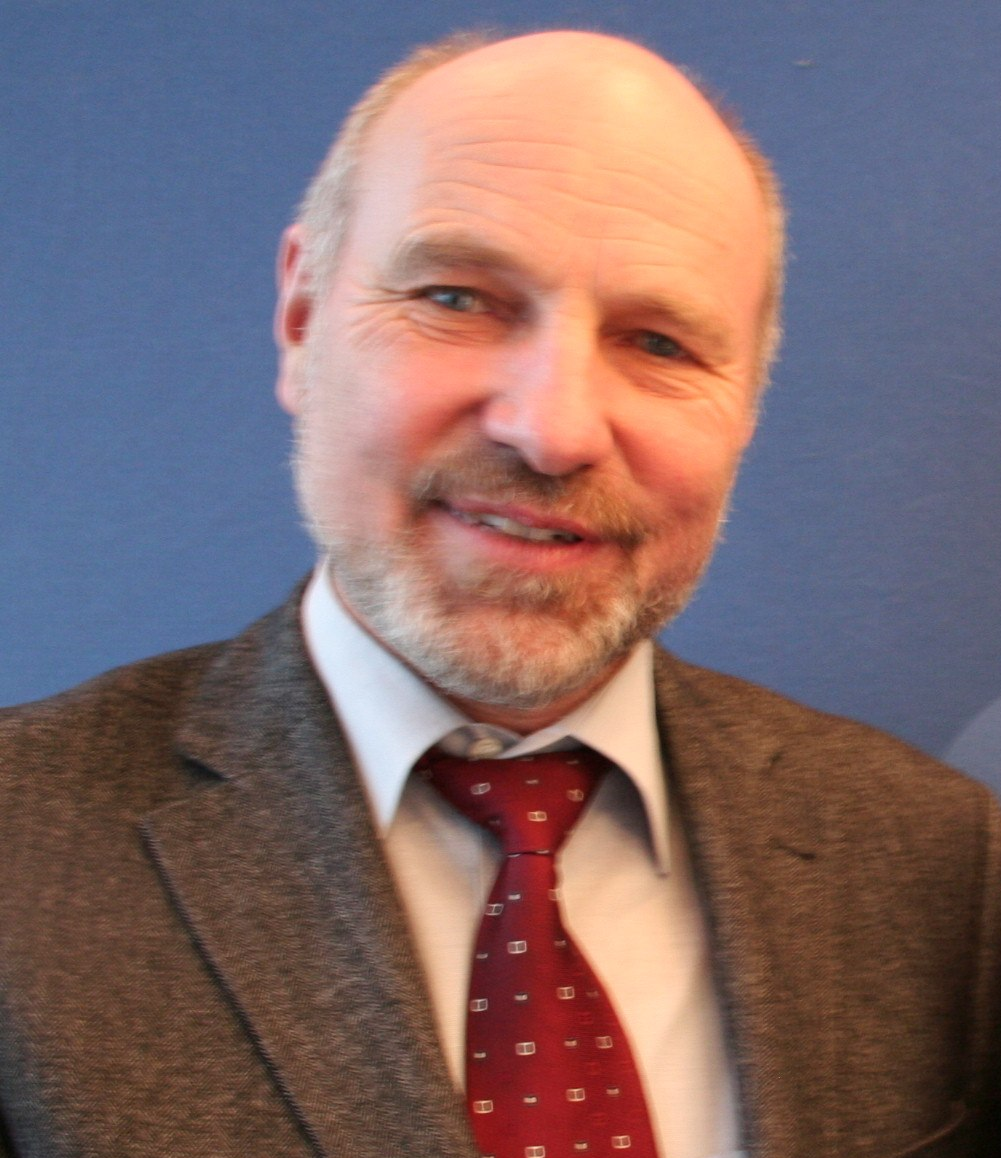
- Rainer Arnold

Member of the Bundestag
- In office 1998–2017

Personal details
- Born: 21 June 1950 (age 76) Stuttgart, Baden-Württemberg, West Germany (now Germany)
- Citizenship: German
- Party: SPD
- Education: Ludwigsburg University of Education
- Occupation: Politician, Member of the German Bundestag (MP)

Rainer Arnold (born 21 June 1950) is a German politician and member of the SPD.

== Political career ==
Arnold was first elected a member of the German Bundestag in the 1998 federal election. During his time in parliament, he was a member of the Defence Committee, and from 2002 he served as the SPD parliamentary group's spokesperson on defence policy. In addition, he served on the Sub-Committee for Disarmament, Arms Control and Non-Proliferation between 1998 and 2002.

From 2002, Arnold was part of the parliamentary group's leadership under successive chairmen Franz Müntefering, Peter Struck, Frank-Walter Steinmeier, and Thomas Oppermann. Within the parliamentary group, he was a member of the working group on municipal policy between 2005 and 2013.

Following the 2013 federal elections, Arnold was part of the SPD team in the negotiations with the CDU/CSU on a coalition agreement. He has since served as deputy chairman of the SPD parliamentary group under the leadership of Thomas Oppermann. In addition, between 2014 and 2015, he represented his parliamentary group in a crossparty committee headed by former defense minister Volker Rühe to review the country's parliamentary rules on military deployments. He also chairs the German-Romanian Parliamentary Friendship Group.

In his capacity as member of the Defence Committee, Arnold traveled extensively to visit Bundeswehr troops on their missions abroad, including Kosovo (2002, 2003, 2004, 2006, 2012), Djibouti (2006), Democratic Republic of the Congo (2006), Afghanistan (2007, 2008, 2009, 2010, 2011, 2012, 2014) and Mali (2013, 2014). In January 2015, he accompanied German Minister of Defence Ursula von der Leyen on a visit to Jordan, where they met with King Abdullah II, among others.

In August 2014 during Ursula von der Leyen's tenure as Minister of Defence, Arnold was extremely unhappy with the state of readiness of the Bundeswehr, and stated that "we are currently unable to meet the commitments we have made to NATO." He was "also annoyed again, because an attempt was made [by the armed forces and ministry] to whitewash and make excuses... Decisions must be made so that weapons projects, which have been in the pipeline for a long time, will finally be put back on the track."

In September 2016, Arnold announced that he would not stand in the 2017 federal elections but instead resign from active politics by the end of the parliamentary term.

== Political positions ==
=== Relations with the African continent ===
Arnold has in the past voted in favor of German participation in United Nations peacekeeping missions as well as in United Nations-mandated European Union peacekeeping missions on the African continent, such as in Somalia – both Operation Atalanta (2010, 2011, 2014 and 2015) and EUTM Somalia (2014, 2015 and 2016) –, Darfur/Sudan (2010, 2011, 2012, 2013, 2014, 2015 and 2016), South Sudan (2011, 2012, 2013, 2014, 2015 and 2016), Mali – EUTM Mali (2013, 2014 and 2015) and AFISMA (2013), and MINUSMA (2013 and 2014) –, the Central African Republic (2014) and Liberia (2015). In 2012 and 2013, he voted against extending the mandate for participation in Operation Atalanta.

=== Veteran affairs ===
Arnold has in the past fought against the proposal for a Veterans Day in Germany, arguing that “in German tradition, soldiers aren’t heroes, but rather victims. And sometimes they committed crimes.” He held that the breadth of Germany's social safety net, with its inexpensive health care, relatively generous unemployment benefits and open access to higher education, means that fewer services are needed specifically for soldiers.

== Other activities ==
- Werner Weinmann Foundation, chairman of the Board
- Europäische Sicherheit & Technik magazine, Member of the Advisory Board
- German Association for Defence Technology (DWT), Member of the Presidium

== Personal life ==
Arnold is married and has one son.
