= CRSP =

CRSP can refer to:

- Canadian Registered Safety Professional designation administered by the Board of Canadian Registered Safety Professionals
- Center for Research in Security Prices, defunct research center
- Center on Race and Social Problems at the University of Pittsburgh
- Centre for Research in Social Policy at Loughborough University
- Clerics Regular of Saint Paul (Barnabites), a religious order in the Catholic Church
- Colorado River Storage Project
- Committee for a Revolutionary Socialist Party, a coalition of American Trotskyist groups.
- Gene symbol for Cofactors Required for SP1 activation, e.g., CRSP3
- The ticker symbol for CRISPR Therapeutics
