= Veterans Day (disambiguation) =

Veterans Day is an annual United States holiday honoring military veterans.

Veterans Day or Veteran's Day or Veterans' Day may also refer to:

- National Veterans' Day, a remembrance day in Finland
- Veterans' Day (Netherlands)
- Veterans Day (Norway)
- Veterans Day (South Korea)
- Veterans Day (Sweden)
- Veterans' Day (United Kingdom) or Armed Forces Day
- Veterans Day (album) by MC Eiht, 2004
- "Veteran's Day", a song and music video by Rick Ross featuring Lil Wayne and Birdman

== See also ==
- Veteranz Day, an album by Big Daddy Kane
- Armistice Day, 11 November observances in other countries, e.g. New Zealand, France, Belgium and Serbia (former name of Veterans Day in the United States)
- Remembrance Day, 11 November observances in the Commonwealth of Nations
