= Certified safety professional =

Qualified safety personnel

Certified safety professional is a certification offered by the Board of Certified Safety Professionals. The accreditation is used in the United States by the National Commission for Certifying Agencies and internationally by the International Organization for Standardization/International Electrotechnical Commission (ISO/IEC 17024) (see ANSI) and 193 Countries Consortium.

The requirements to become a certified safety professional are:

- A minimum of a bachelor’s degree in any field or an associate in safety, health, or the environment, or a closely related field.

- The associate degree must include at least four courses with at least 12 semester hours/18 quarter hours of study in the safety, health, or environmental domains covered in the certified safety professional examination blueprint.

- 4 years of safety experience where safety is at least 50%, preventative, professional level with breadth and depth of safety duties
- A BCSP-approved credential:

- Associate safety professional
- Graduate safety practitioner
- Certified industrial hygienist
- Chartered member of the Institution of Occupational Safety and Health
- Canadian registered safety professional
- Professional Member of the Singapore Institute of Safety Officers
- Member in the Institute of Safety Professionals of Nigeria
- NEBOSH National or International Diploma in Occupational Health and Safety
- Diploma/Certificate in Industrial Safety, as issued by the State Government Departments/Boards of Technical Education, Government of India
- Fire and Safety Forum Advanced & Post-Graduate and Master Diploma and TTP, Research Ambassador Member's

- Must pass the CSP examination.

CSPs are further required to provide BCSP with proof that they are maintaining a high level of competency in safety work by recertifying every five years.

== Other sources of safety certification ==
=== Canadian registered safety professional ===
Similar to the CSP in the US, Canada offers the CRSP (Canadian Registered Safety Professional) designation, through the Board of Canadian Registered Safety Professionals

Pre-Requisite:

Applicants must meet some prerequisites prior to submitting a formal application:

1. Educational Pursuits: must have minimally completed high school. By 2009, this requirement will change to college or university education in health and safety.
2. Past Work Experience: must have at least three years of continuous work experience in the Occupational and Environmental Health & Safety field
3. Current Employment: must include greater than 50% (over 900 hours/year), in Occupational and Environmental Health & Safety activities.

Registration Process:

1. Application: Once the applicant has met the prerequisites, they must complete the "Application for Canadian Registered Safety Professional Designation", obtained from the BCRSP board. The lengthy application requires a compilation of all the applicant's course and job descriptions.

2. Evaluation: The BCRSP Board reviews the application. The applicant is then advised if they meet the minimum requirements or not. If the application is accepted, then the applicant is advised that they will soon be contacted for an interview.

3. Interview: The interview is set up with a member of the BCRSP's Regional Screening Centre personnel in the applicant's geographical area. It's an informal meeting, where the applicant's work and educational Occupational Health & Safety experience are discussed.

4. Examination: The applicant has to write a comprehensive 3.5 hour multiple choice exam that covers Accident Theory, Environmental Practices, Ergonomics, Fire Prevention and Protection, Health Promotion, HSE Auditing, Law and Ethics, Occupational Health Safety and Environment Systems, Occupational Hygiene, Risk Management, and Safety Techniques and Technology. Study guides and books are recommended by the Board, and numerous preparatory courses are available through:

- British Columbia Institute of Technology
- Canadian Society of Safety Engineering
- Institute of Quality, Safety and Environmental Management
- Raising the Standard Consulting
- Faculty of Extension University of Alberta

4. Approval: If the applicant minimally achieves the passing score on the examination, they receive notification of such.

5. Confirmation: The applicant revives the CRSP Designation along with their designation registration number.

Career Development:

In Order to maintain a professional safety designation continuing education is often required with most designations. To be in good standing with the certification body, continuing education units or professional developmental conferences must be completed within a designated time frame and approved by the certification body. Some provincial trade associations and safety associations have their industry designations such as:

- National Construction Safety Officer
- Health and Safety Administrator
- Health and safety Professional
- Certified Health and Safety Consultant
- Certified Health and Safety Management Systems Auditor
- Qualified Safety Professional

=== Safety certification in Europe ===
Internationally, other countries have set up similar programs. In the UK the highest professional standing is that of a chartered safety and health practitioner or fellow of the International Institute of Risk and Safety Management. The standards are maintained by both the UK's largest body for safety professionals Institution of Occupational Safety and Health and the International Institute of Risk and Safety Management. Like North American safety professional programs, to achieve these grades the applicant must be professionally qualified and have relevant experience. Continuing professional development is also a strong requirement of both memberships. The International Institute of Risk and Safety Management also offered Recognised Safety Professional (not to be confused with 'registered safety practitioners' of OSHCR) these honorary post nominal letters given by to recognised safety practitioners.

== See also ==
- Safety engineering
- Hazard analysis and hazard and operability study
