= International whisk(e)y day =

Support of Scottish, Canadian, and Japanese whiskies

International Whisk(e)y Day
- Status: active
- Frequency: annual
- Next event: 27 March 2026
- Area: Worldwide

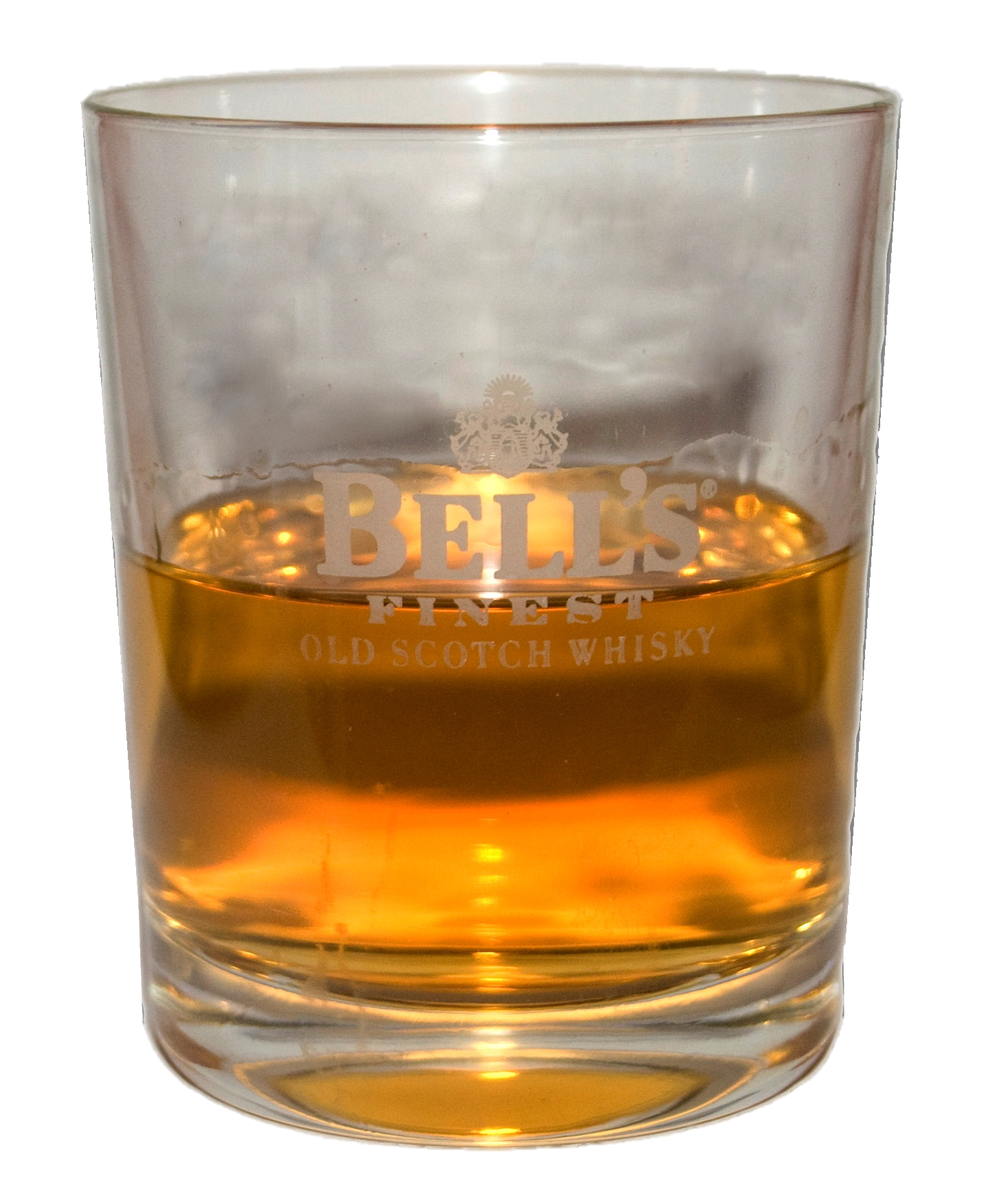
A glass of Bell's Scotch whisky

International Whisk(e)y Day was first announced by a group of writers in 2008 and falls on 27 March each year. The name is used with the parenthesis to indicate support of whisky (no e) from Scotland, Canada and Japan as well as Irish and American whiskeys (with an e).

== Founding ==
International Whiskey Day was announced on 27 March 2008 and then launched in 2009 at the Whiskey Day Festival in the northern Netherlands in the presence of several whiskey writers. The event was created in honor of British writer Michael Jackson and is celebrated on Jackson's birthday.

== Participation ==
Participants are encouraged to raise a glass and drink whiskey for the love of the drink as well as to celebrate Michael's life. Others participate via social media using the #whiskyday2015 hashtag. Various bars may have specials on 27 March to celebrate the day.

Taken from the International Whisk(e)y Day's website: "International Whisk(e)y Day is a non-profit celebration of whiskey which receives no funding and is run entirely by the passion of whiskey fans from around the world. So if you love whisk(e)y and want to help spread the word, then go ahead and tell someone about it."

== Other Whiskey Days ==
International Whisk(e)y Day is not to be confused with World Whisky Day or National Bourbon Day which fall in May and June respectively.

There is some conflict with World Whiskey Day, as International Whisk(e)y day claims to be the original. This conflict only really exists because WWD is the more well known date in the United States and IWD organizers do not want to be seen as the copycat since they were founded four years earlier. There is also a conflict because the two groups use similar hashtags, and it is not obvious to most people which is which. However, the dates of each event are on separate days in separate months.

There is not as much of a conflict with National Bourbon Day because it specifically celebrates America's "Native Spirit" and not, generically, all whiskeys.

== See also ==
- List of food days
- World Whisky Day
- National Bourbon Day
