= Ceremonial first puck =

Traditional ritual of ice hockey

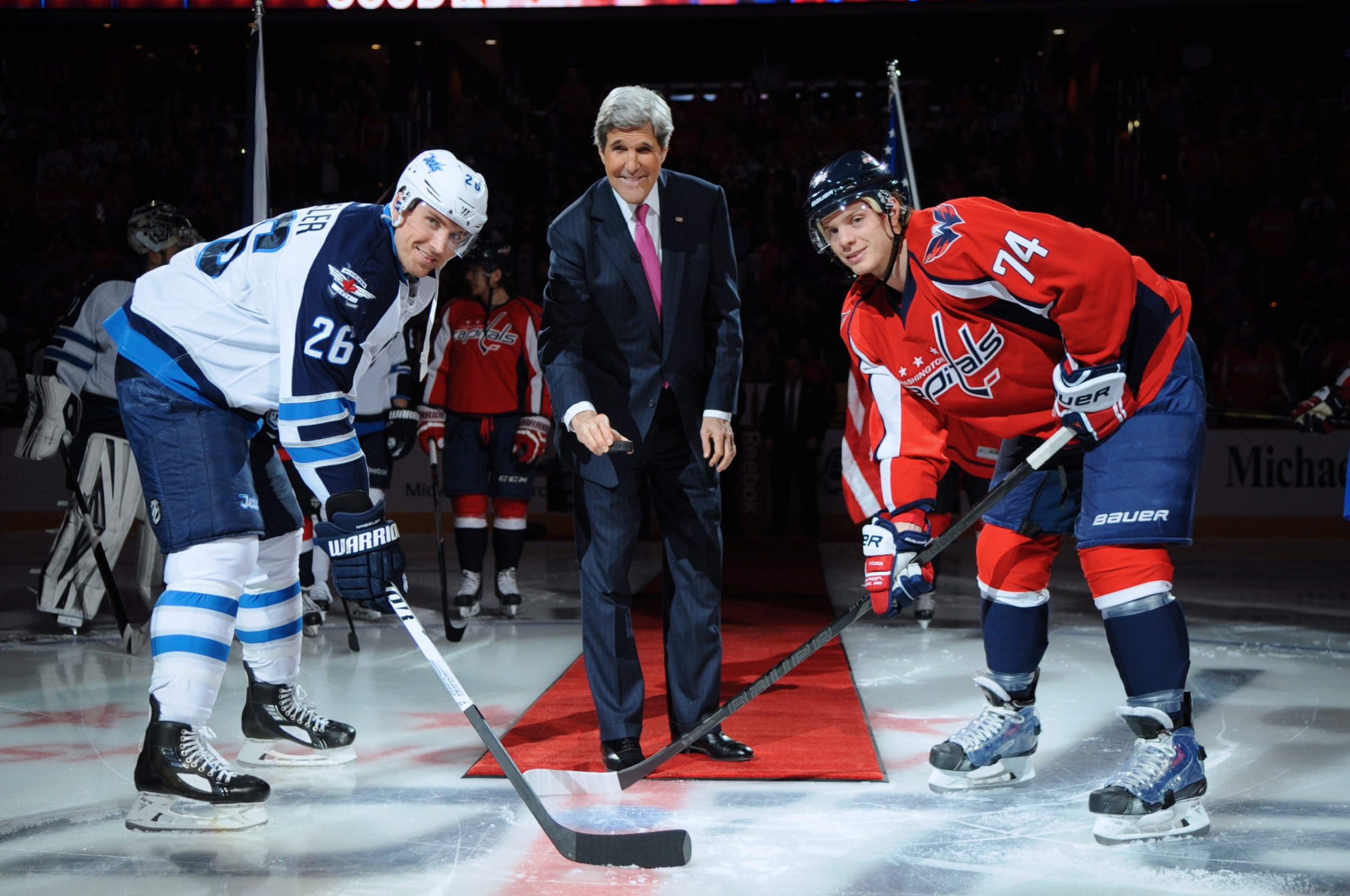
U.S. Secretary of State John Kerry prepares to drop the ceremonial first puck with Winnipeg Jets player Blake Wheeler and Washington Capitals player John Carlson.

The ceremonial first puck is a longstanding ritual of ice hockey in which a guest of honor drops a puck to mark the end of pregame festivities and the start of the game. Like baseball's ceremonial first pitch, this first puck does not actually begin play but is retrieved and presented to the guest of honour as a keepsake. In the National Hockey League (NHL), the anthem is routinely played before the ceremonial first puck.

The ceremonial puck dropper may be a notable person (dignitary, celebrity, former player, etc.) who is in attendance, an executive from a company that sponsors the team (especially when that company has sponsored that night's promotional giveaway), or a person who has been awarded the privilege as a result of some recent contest or current event. Especially in the minor leagues, multiple first puck drops are not uncommon; the honoree may merely pose at centre ice displaying his commemorative puck without actually dropping it into any faceoff.

== Related terms ==
The ceremonial first puck is also referred to as the "ceremonial puck drop". Both terms emphasize that the attention is typically on the honoree who actually drops the puck rather than on the vying for it. Significantly, the ceremony involves the two opposing captains (even a goaltender) who "face off" nonconfrontationally since tradition dictates that the home player always "wins" and presents the puck to the guest of honor.

The official website of the National Hockey League uses the term "ceremonial first puck" about twice as frequently as the somewhat synonymous term "ceremonial faceoff". As of November 2008, the sports news organization ESPN has never used the term "ceremonial faceoff" in any headline or teaser, while "ceremonial first puck" and "ceremonial puck drop" are used regularly.

== Noteworthy first pucks ==
On October 6, 2002, in front of a crowd of 18,000 at General Motors Place, Elizabeth II, the Queen of Canada dropped the ceremonial first puck for the National Hockey League exhibition game between the Vancouver Canucks and San Jose Sharks; this was the first time any reigning monarch, Canadian or otherwise, had performed the task.

The 2007 NHL All-Star game first puck was dropped by Texas Governor Rick Perry and Dallas Stars center Mike Modano on January 24, 2007.

California Governor Arnold Schwarzenegger dropped the ceremonial first puck on May 27, 2007, when the Anaheim Ducks hosted the Ottawa Senators.

Brian Leetch dropped the first puck on October 4, 2007, at a New York Rangers game.

Capitalizing on her well-publicized advocacy of ice hockey and her self-identification as a "hockey mom", 2008 Republican Party Vice Presidential nominee Sarah Palin was invited to perform the ceremonial first puck drop at NHL games during the campaign, including the Philadelphia Flyers hosting of the New York Rangers on October 11 and the St. Louis Blues hosting of the Los Angeles Kings on October 24. At her Philadelphia appearance, Palin was booed by a number of fans in attendance.

As a native New Yorker and former Chairman of the Joint Chiefs of Staff, Colin Powell dropped the ceremonial first puck at a New York Islanders game at Nassau Coliseum on November 11, 2008, in recognition of Military Appreciation Day and Veterans Day. Powell, the first black U.S. Secretary of State and first black U.S. National Security Adviser, had earlier dropped an Islander puck on January 21, 2008, in honor of Martin Luther King Day.

Newark, New Jersey-native NBA legend Shaquille O'Neal dropped the first puck on January 11, 2014 at a New Jersey Devils game.

== Literal "first" puck ==
Although hockey has been played on ice since at least 1825, the game then more closely resembled field hockey rather than modern ice hockey. By the 1870s, the advantages of a stubby cylinder on a surface of flat ice led to the use of what the Montreal Gazette of March 4, 1875 called "a flat, circular piece of wood" which "slid about between the players with great velocity". The same publication finally referred to the hockey object as a "puck" on February 7, 1876.
