= Canadian Registered Safety Professional =

Board of Canadian Registered Safety Professionals certification

The Canadian Registered Safety Professional (CRSP)/ Professionnel en sécurité agréé du Canada (PSAC) is a certification offered by the Board of Canadian Registered Safety Professionals for an Occupational Health and Safety professional. The CRSP/PSAC is accredited in Canada to ISO 17024 by the Standards Council of Canada.

A CRSP applies safety knowledge to develop systems that will manage control over hazards and exposures detrimental to people, equipment, material and the environment. A CRSP follows the principles of loss control, accident prevention and environmental protection through their daily activities.

== Requirements ==
The requirements to become a CRSP/PSAC are:

- minimum of a two-year diploma in occupational health and safety from an accredited College or University or a bachelor* in various disciplines
- four years of continuous occupational health and safety experience in the past five years
- pass the CRSP Examination
- if applying with a non-OHS bachelor, demonstrate professional development activities spanning the breadth of the examination domains

=== Canadian Registered Safety Professional Examination (CRSPEX) ===
The CRSPEX is a criterion-referenced examination which tests whether qualified examination candidates have demonstrated a minimum standard of practice. The examination is a closed book, 3 1/2-hour multiple choice examination delivered by computer-based testing at proctored examination centres. Assessment Strategies Inc. is the examination consultants for the Board of Canadian Registered Safety Professionals (BCRSP). The examination is developed on computer based testing through Kryterion's test centre network. The CRSP Examination Blueprint was developed to guide those involved in the development of the CRSPEX and to provide the public (e.g., examinees, educators, administrators) with practical information about the examination.

=== Recertification ===
After obtaining the CRSP/PSAC certification, there is a mandatory continuous professional development (CPD) program requirement in order to maintain certification with the BCRSP.

The Governing Board authorizes the use of the terms “Canadian Registered Safety Professional (CRSP)/Professionnel en sécurité agréé du Canada (PSAC) by certificants as long as they have a current and valid certificate. The corporate logo, Canadian Registered Safety Professional (CRSP) and CRSP PSAC are registered with Industry Canada and its use is prohibited except on printed or symbolic items provided by the Board or its designated suppliers.

== About the Board ==
The Board of Canadian Registered Safety Professionals (BCRSP) provides certification of occupational health and safety professionals in Canada and has an established Code of Ethics. The BCRSP has certified over 5000 individuals since its incorporation in 1976.

The BCRSP is a public interest, not-for-profit, ISO 17024 accredited and ISO 9001 certified organization. The BCRSP grants the ‘’’Canadian Registered Safety Professional (CRSP)/Professionnel en sécurité agréé du Canada (PSAC) ‘’’designation to individuals who successfully complete the certification process through application assessment, interview and examination.

The BCRSP has a membership with the Canadian Network of National Associations of Regulators (CNNAR).

== Formation ==
The Canadian Society of Safety Engineering's Education & Research Committee reported a need for a generalist certification for Occupational Health and Safety (OH&S) practitioners. In November 1974, a steering committee was formed to implement recommendations and establish the first Board of Governors. A meeting was held March 3, 1975 and the proposed name was Canadian Registered Safety Professional. Consumer and Corporate Affairs issued a Letters Patent on February 10, 1976.

== Reciprocal Agreements ==
BCRSP has Memoranda of Understanding (MOUs) with the Board of Certified Safety Professionals (USA) and the Institute for Occupational Safety and Health (UK).

The MOUs allow either CSPs (USA designation) or CMIOSHs (UK designation) to apply for the CRSP/PSAC certification through a streamlined application process.

The Certified Safety Professional (CSP) is a certification offered by the Board of Certified Safety Professionals (BCSP). The CSP is accredited in the United States by the National Commission for Certifying Agencies and internationally by the International Organization for Standardization/International Electrotechnical Commission (ISO/IEC 17024) (see ANSI).

The requirements to become a CSP are:

- an associate degree in safety and health, or an accredited bachelor's degree in any field
- four or more years of professional safety experience
- passing the Safety Fundamentals and/or Comprehensive Practice examinations
- CSPs are further required to provide BCSP with proof that they are maintaining a high level of competency in safety work by re-certifying every five years.
- The Charter Member IOSH (CMIOSH) is a designation offered by the Institution of Occupational Safety and Health (IOSH). Chartered Members of the Institution are entitled to use the designation Chartered Safety and Health Practitioner and the designatory letters CMIOSH. Chartered Member status requires approved educational qualifications and experience. All Chartered Members are required to maintain a Continuing Professional Development (CPD) record. IOSH (CMIOSH) has a reciprocal agreement with the CRSP designation.

== See also ==
- Institute for Credentialing Excellence (ICE)
- Canadian Society of Safety Engineering
- Standards Council of Canada
- BSI Group
