= Military Appreciation Day =

Day to express appreciation for people in the military

Military Appreciation Day is any event intended to express appreciation for men and women currently (and sometimes formerly) in military service, just like Armed Forces Day. A particular "Military Appreciation Day" is a date selected for convenience, typically but not necessarily approximate to Veterans Day or Memorial Day nor Armed Forces Day.

== Sports teams ==
The NHL's New York Islanders first instituted a "Military Appreciation Day" in 2007. Their 2008 commemoration coincided with November 11, and was attended by former Chairman of the Joint Chiefs of Staff, General Colin Powell, who dropped the ceremonial first puck of that game. The Islanders intend each year's "Military Appreciation Day" to be the home game closest to Veterans Day.

The New York Jets of the NFL's American Football Conference have commemorated “Jets Military Appreciation Day” since 2000. Recent dates include November 19, 2006; November 4, 2007; and November 9, 2008.

In 2015, it was reported that the United States Department of Defense provided millions in funding to professional sports organizations in exchange for pro-military messaging, such as a "salute" to active duty soldiers and war veterans.

== Zoos ==
Hawaii – The USO Hawaii sponsored the first Military Appreciation Day at the Honolulu Zoo in 2005. In 2008, the event was on Saturday, June 28.

Virginia – The USO and the Virginia Zoo hosted a 2008 "MAD" on Sunday, October 5.

Washington – Near Tacoma, Washington, the Point Defiance Zoo & Aquarium celebrated MAD on Tuesday, November 11, 2008 with free admission for active duty military, veterans and their families.

== Hospitality industry ==
The Golden Corral chain gives a free “thank you” dinner to any person who has ever served in the United States Military on its "Military Appreciation Monday". In 2008, the event was held on Monday, November 17, 2008 from 5 pm to 9 pm.

Six Flags Over Georgia observes four branch-specific MADs, granting free admission to military personnel on September 18, 19, 25, and 26 in 2010.

National Speed, Inc. holds a yearly Military Appreciation Day event open to all branches of the military and to the public. The event is always held on Armed Forces Day and all proceeds are donated to Wounded Warrior Project.

== See also ==
- National Military Appreciation Month
