= Haitian Day Parade =

The Haitian Day Parade takes place annually along Nostrand Avenue / Toussaint Louverture Boulevard (NY's Little Haiti), Brooklyn, New York City in the month of May during Haitian Heritage Month in honor of the inhabitants of Haiti and all people of Haitian birth or heritage residing in the mainland United States. The parade incorporates its patriotic theme with its musical entertainment, carnival-style floats, vibrant costume colors and cuisine.

== See also ==
- Labor Day Carnival
- J'ouvert
