= Occupational Safety and Health Professional Day =

Occupational Safety and Health Professional (OSHP) Day recognizes the efforts and commitment of occupational safety, health and environmental professionals to protect people, property and the environment. The American Society of Safety Engineers’ Board of Directors approved the creation of Occupational Safety and Health Professional (OSHP) Day in March 2006 to be held in conjunction with North American Occupational Safety and Health Week (NAOSH). OSHP Day takes place on the Wednesday of NAOSH Week each year and is celebrated internationally. OSHP Day 2012 took place on May 9, 2012.

Occupational safety and health professionals make sure that millions of workers who go to work each day return home safely. They help identify and reduce workplace hazards while reducing employer costs and maximizing the contributions of all workers. Safety professionals draw and apply standards from various disciplines including engineering, education, psychology, physiology, enforcement, hygiene, health, physics and management. They use all appropriate tools, methods and techniques available to them in order to prevent accidents, illnesses, fires, explosions and other situations that are harmful to people, property and the environment.

OSHP Day recognizes the contributions of these professionals to the safety of workers and workplaces and aims to raise further awareness and pride in the profession.

In 2007, the United States Senate passed the NAOSH/OSHP Day resolution with the 110th Congress–1st Session–S.Res.193 designating May 9, 2007 as OSHP Day and May 6 – 12, 2007 as NAOSH Week.

The 2017 date for this observance is May 10.
