= Independence Day (Georgia) =

National holiday in Georgia

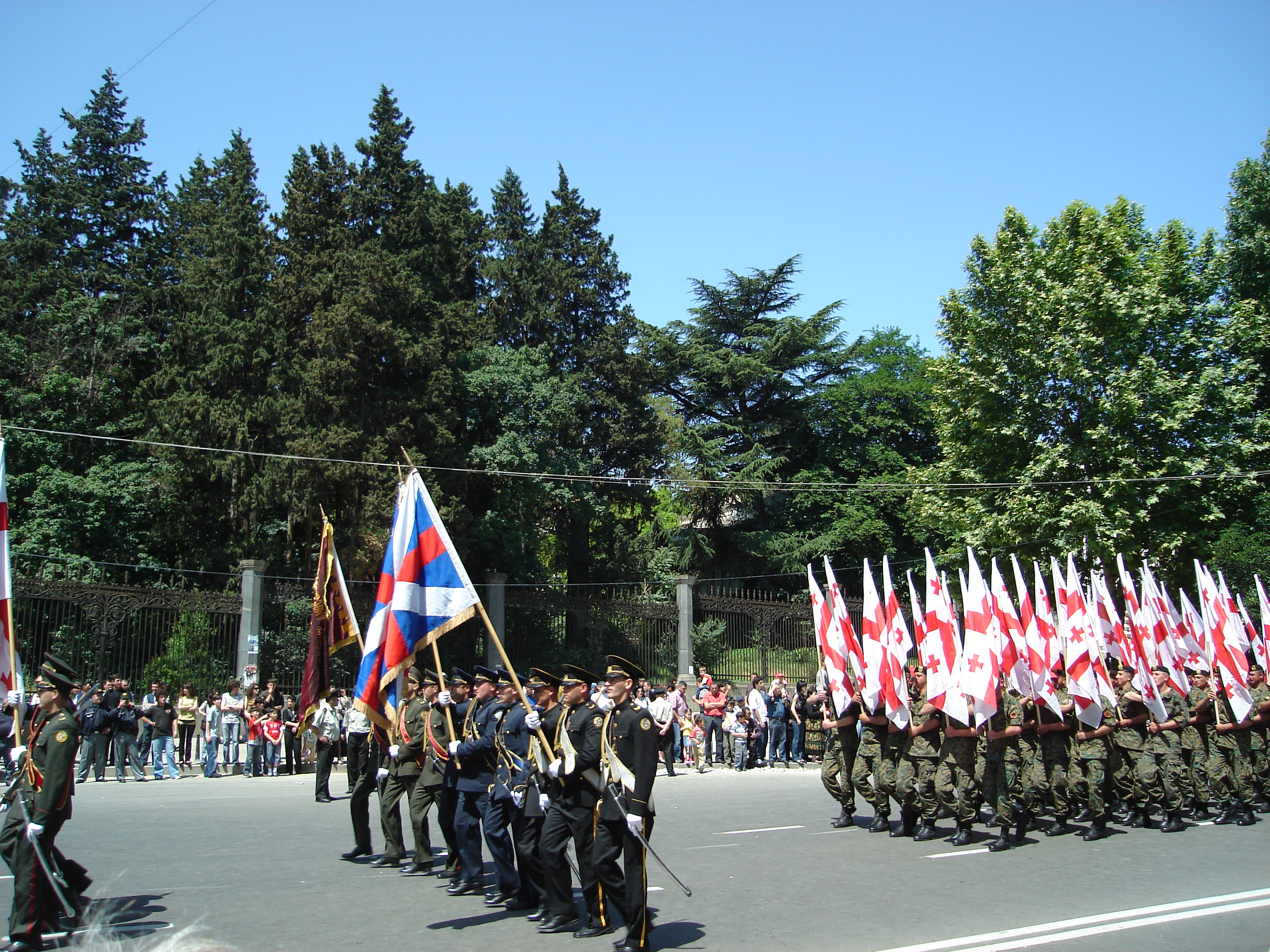
- Georgian soldiers with national flags marching on Rustaveli Avenue, Tbilisi, on 26 May 2008
- Also called: May twenty-sixth
- Observed by: Georgia
- Type: National holiday
- Significance: The day in 1918 that the Act of Independence was adopted by the National Council of Georgia in Tbilisi
- Celebrations: Military parade with the speeches by the President, prime minister, other Government officials and foreign guests, Flag hoisting, Fireworks, concerts, exhibitions, "flower festival", etc.
- Date: 26 May
- Frequency: annual
- Related to: Day of National Unity (9 April)

Independence Day (Georgian: დამოუკიდებლობის დღე, romanized: damouk'ideblobis dghe) is an annual public holiday in Georgia observed on 26 May. It commemorates the 26 May 1918 adoption of the Act of Independence, which established the Democratic Republic of Georgia in the aftermath of the Russian Revolution of 1917. It is the national day of Georgia. Independence Day is associated with military parades, fireworks, concerts, fairs, and political speeches and ceremonies, in addition to various other public and private events celebrating the history and culture of Georgia.

== Background ==
Georgia, which was annexed by the Russian Empire starting in 1801, took advantage of the chaotic aftermath of the Russian Revolution and declared itself an independent Democratic Republic on 26 May 1918.

In February–March 1921 the Democratic Republic of Georgia fell to the invading Russian army and the country became a Soviet Socialist Republic, being annexed into the Soviet Union in 1922. Georgia seceded from the Soviet Union, adopting the Act of Reestablishment of Independence on 9 April 1991, on the second anniversary of the Soviet military crackdown on a large pro-independence rally in Georgia's capital of Tbilisi in 1989.

Due to its symbolism and historical significance, 9 April has been advocated to be recognized as Independence Day by the groups associated with the 1980s national movement and the government of Zviad Gamsakhurdia, which presided over the declaration of independence on 9 April 1991. During their rule (October 1990 – January 1992), Gamsakhurdia's government had instituted 26 May as Independence Day; the 9 April 1991 declaration stated it was based on the 26 May 1918 Act of Independence. The preceding referendum on 31 March 1991 had also asked the citizens of Georgia whether they wanted independence to be restored on the basis of the 26 May 1918 declaration. Since 1993, 9 April has been observed as the Day of National Unity, Civic Concordance, and Remembrance in Georgia.

== History ==
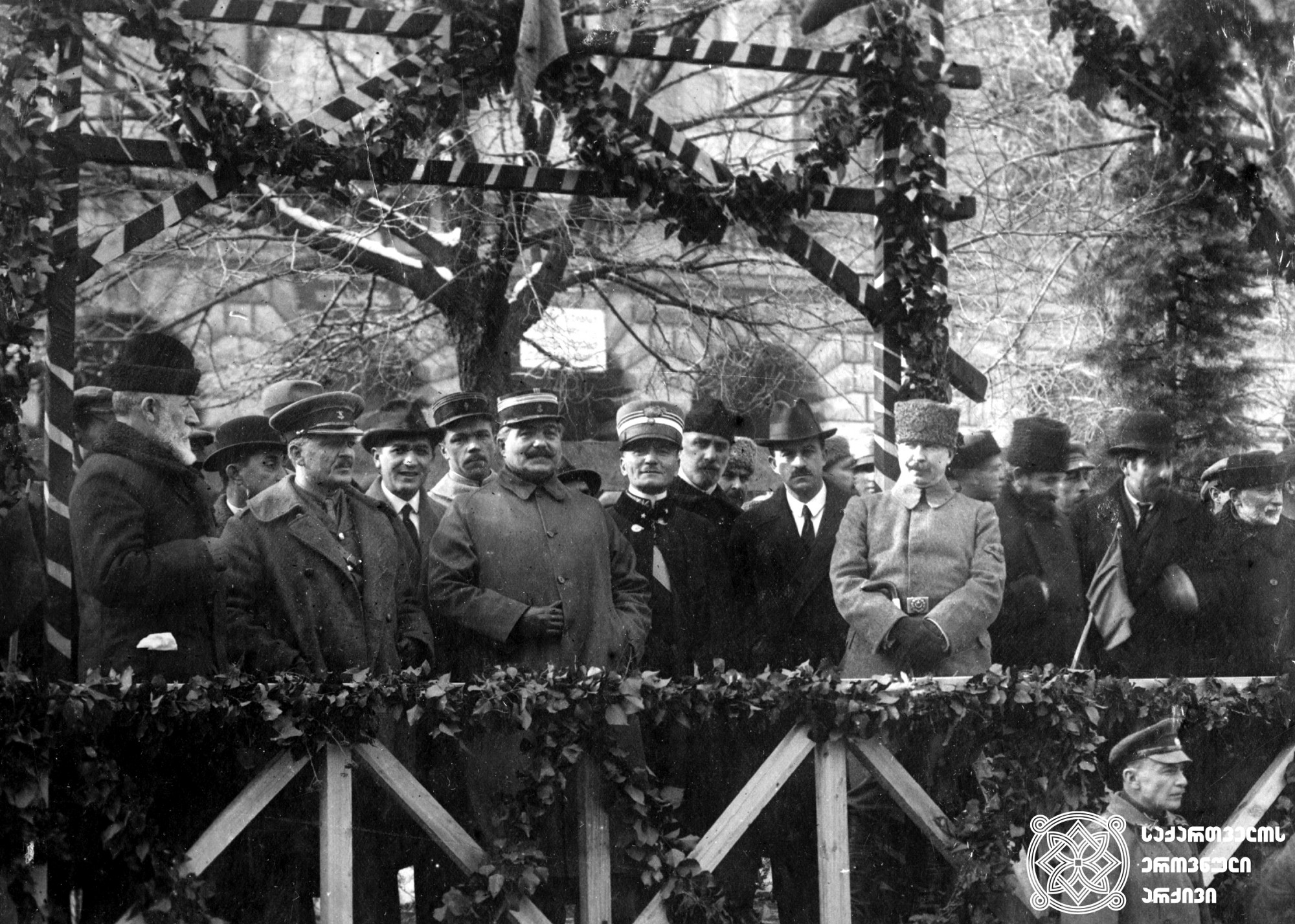
Georgian independence day celebrations in 1919.

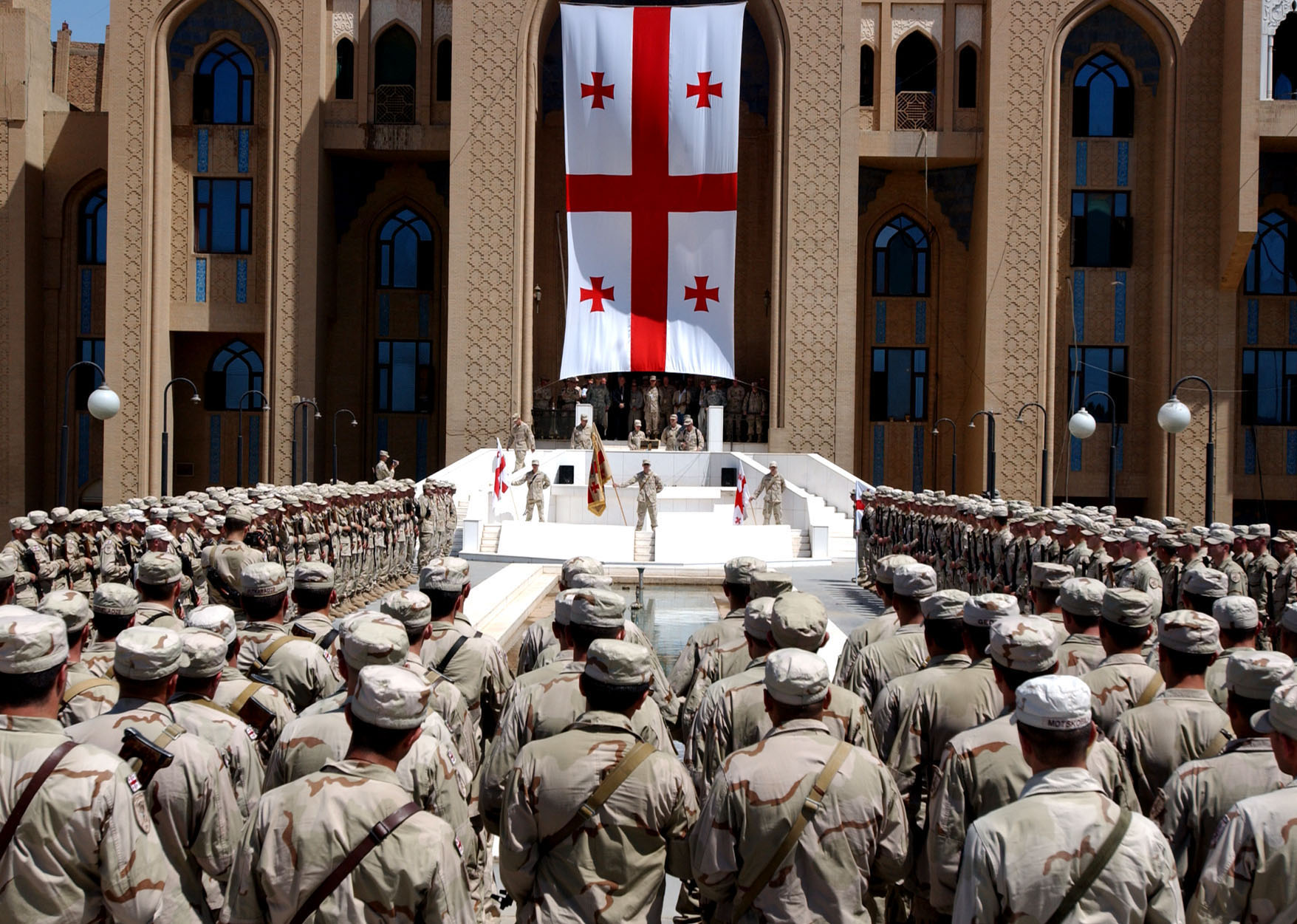
Georgian troops deployed in Iraq celebrate Independence Day in Baghdad on 26 May 2006

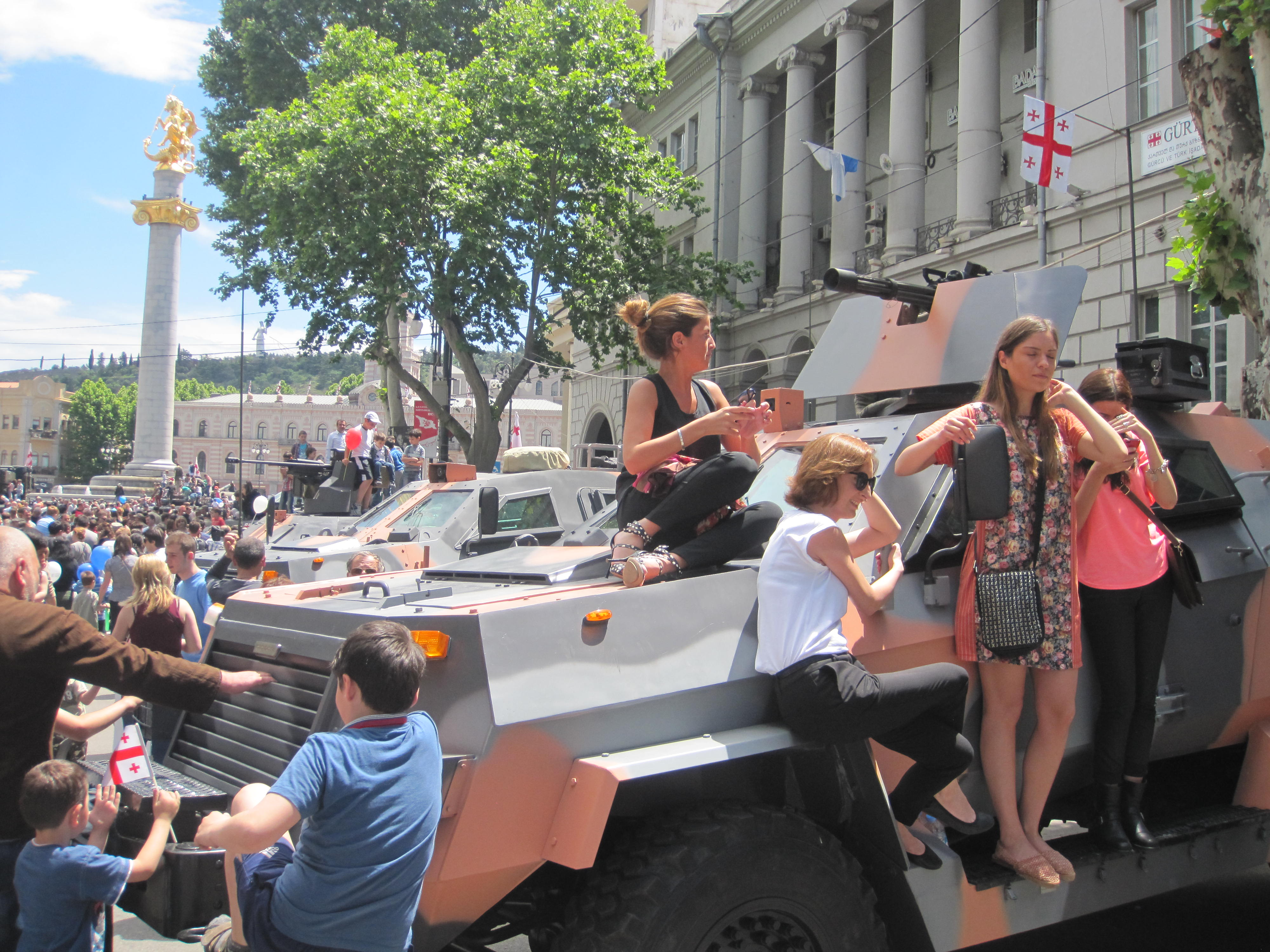
People posing at military hardware displayed in Tbilisi on 26 May 2014

26 May had been celebrated as the national day of the Democratic Republic of Georgia until the Soviet takeover in 1921. During the Soviet era, it was clandestinely observed by segments of society opposed to the Communist regime. This has resulted in some activists, such as Dimitri Vardanashvili, facing criminal prosecution by the Soviet regime.

As the Georgian national movement regained momentum in the late 1980s, the symbols associated with the short-lived pre-Soviet republic became a rallying cry for those advocating independence from the Soviet Union. After Georgia's declaration of independence on 9 April 1991, the government set on 26 May 1991 Georgia's first presidential election, which was won by Zviad Gamsakhurdia. Georgia met 26 May of the next year with the new government led by Eduard Shevardnadze; Gamsakhurdia had been ousted in a military coup earlier that year. The 26 May 1992 celebration was attended by Shevardnadze's old acquaintance James Baker. The day also witnessed one of the first major anti-Shevardnadze demonstrations in the streets of Tbilisi.

Through much of Shevardnadze's rule, Independence Day was a civilian observance. Since 1997, no military parades had been organized by the government, citing financial difficulties. Shevardnadze's successor as President of Georgia, Mikheil Saakashvili, restored, in 2004, tradition of holding military parades, which was used as a venue to exhibit new equipment of the Defence Forces of Georgia. 26 May 2004 saw the largest ever military parade in Georgia.

During Saakashvili's second term of presidency, the Independence Day celebrations were overshadowed by political instability; in 2008 and 2009 large opposition rallies in central Tbilisi limited the scale of the celebrations and in 2011 an attempt by part of the opposition at obstructing a military parade planned for 26 May led to fatalities during a clash with police.

After the Georgian Dream coalition acceded to power in 2012, a military component of the Independence Day celebration was limited to oath-taking ceremonies of Georgian soldiers and public exhibitions of military technology. The marchpast before the authorities did not return until the 105th Independence Day celebrations in 2023.

=== Notable anniversaries ===
- 26 May 1918 – The National Council of Georgia adopts the Act of Independence of Georgia.
- 26 May 1920 – Leaders of the Second International attend the Independence Day demonstration in Tbilisi as part of their visit to Georgia.
- 26 May 1921 – The new Bolshevik government of Georgia marks Independence Day to celebrate the sovietization of Georgia, barring the national flags of the overthrown Democratic Republic of Georgia from being displayed during the celebrations.
- 26 May 1922 – Soviet security forces break up rallies to mark the Georgian Independence Day in Tbilisi and other places in the Georgian SSR.
- 26 May 1989 – Pro-independence demonstrators gather in Tbilisi to mark Independence Day for the first time since 1922.
- 26 May 1991 – Georgia holds its first presidential election. A National Guard parade marks the first official post-Soviet Independence Day celebration.
- 26 May 1992 – Georgian security forces break up a rally of supporters of the ousted President Gamsakhurdia, while James Baker attends the official celebrations of Independence Day.
- 26 May 2004 – The new government of Georgia marks Independence Day with the largest-ever military parade.
- 26 May 2011 – Police prevent attempts by an opposition party to block the venue of an Independence Day military parade, resulting in four deaths.
- 26 May 2012 – The first military parade outside the capital took place in Kutaisi near the New Georgian Parliament Building.
- 26 May 2018 – Georgia celebrated the 100th anniversary of the declaration of independence of the First Republic of Georgia. More than 20 high level delegations arrive to attend the event, including the presidents of Poland, Slovakia, Latvia, Finland, Armenia, and the European Commission.
- 26 May 2021 – Georgia celebrated the 30th anniversary of the restoration of independence. The remains of commander-in-chief of the Democratic Republic of Georgia Giorgi Kvinitadze were reburied with full military honors to the Mtatsminda Pantheon in Tbilisi on 26 May.

== Videos ==
- სამხედრო აღლუმი თბილისში. 1997 წელი
