= Veterans Day (South Korea) =

Korean memorial day

- Observed by: South Korea
- Date: 8 October
- Next time: 8 October 2026
- Frequency: annual

Veterans Day is an annual memorial day in the Republic of Korea that is marked on 8 October. It was first observed in 1956.
