= Take a Girl Child to Work Day =

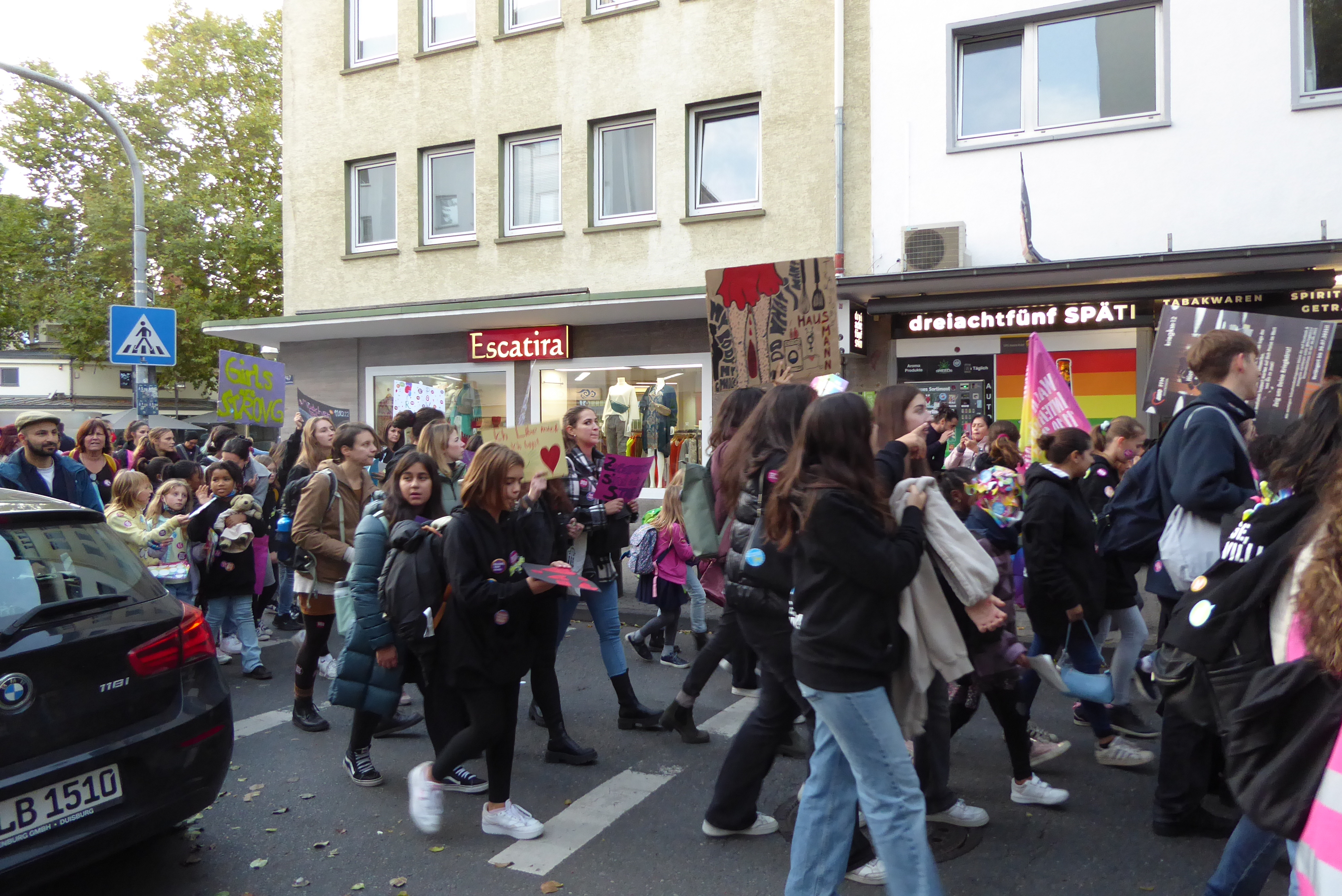

Take a Girl Child to Work Day is an annual corporate social investment event, held in South Africa since 2003. Companies involved organise for female learners (school pupils), usually from disadvantaged backgrounds, to spend the day at their place of work on the last Thursday of May. The initiative is organised by Cell C, a cellular service provider, and endorsed by the South African Department of Education. It has been called South Africa's "largest collaborative act of volunteerism".

== History ==
Cell C launched Take a Girl Child to Work Day in 2003 as a corporate social investement initiative exposing young female students to the corporate workforce. Companies involved typically invite a small number of female pupils to spend a day at their workplace and learn about career opportunities in that company's field. According to Vitrovian, the event is held on the last Thursday of May.

Since the event's creation, numerous organizations have joined in participating in Take a Girl Child to Work Day, including the South African Department of Science and Technology, the National Empowerment Fund, and Kisch IP.

== See also ==
- Take Our Daughters and Sons to Work Day, usually held on the fourth Thursday of April in the United States, is a similar initiative launched by the Ms. Foundation for Women in 1993
- International Women's Day on 8 March
- National Women's Day, a South African public holiday on 9 August
- 16 Days of Activism against Gender Violence, held between 25 November (International Day against Violence against Women) and 10 December (International Human Rights Day), and known in South Africa as 16 Days of Activism for No Violence against Women and Children
- Women in South Africa
- Women in the workforce
