= Public holidays in Georgia =

Date	English name	Georgian name	Transliteration	Remarks
1-2 January	New Year's Day	ახალი წელი	Akhali ts'eli	
7 January	Orthodox Christmas	ქრისტეშობა	Krist'eshoba	
19 January	Orthodox Epiphany	ნათლისღება	Natlisgheba	
3 March	Mother's Day	დედის დღე	Dedis dghe	
8 March	International Women's Day	ქალთა საერთაშორისო დღე	Kalta saertashoriso dghe	
9 April	National Unity Day	ეროვნული ერთიანობის დღე	Erovnuli ertianobis dghe	Commemoration of the April 9 tragedy 1989 (also known as Tbilisi Massacre, Tbilisi tragedy) when on Rustaveli Avenue, in Tbilisi an anti-Soviet demonstration was dispersed by the Soviet Army, resulting in 20 deaths and hundreds of injuries.
Moveable	Eastern Orthodox Good Friday, Holy Saturday, Easter Sunday and Easter Monday of Bright Week	სააღდგომო დღეები – წითელი პარასკევი, დიდი შაბათი, ბრწყინვალე აღდგომა და ორშაბათი	Saaghdgomo dgheebi – ts'iteli parask'evi, didi shabati, brts'q'invale aghdgoma da orshabati	On Bright Monday, the Georgian Orthodox Church serves Liturgy for Dismissals
9 May	Day of Victory over Fascism, Europe Day	ფაშიზმზე გამარჯვების დღე, ევროპის დღე	P'ashizmze gamarjvebis dghe, evropis dghe	
12 May	Saint Andrew the First-Called Day	წმინდა მოციქულის ანდრია პირველწოდებულის საქართველოში შემოსვლის დღე	Ts'minda motsikulis andria P'irvelts'odebulis sakartveloshi shemosvlis dghe	Celebration of day of Apostle Andrew the 'first-called', founder of Georgian Orthodox Church
17 May	Day of Family Purity and Respect for Parents	ოჯახის სიწმინდისა და მშობლების პატივისცემის დღე	ojakhis sits’mindisa da mshoblebis p’at’ivistsemis dghe	Celebration of Family Day, originated by Georgian Orthodox Church. Coincides with anniversary of 2013 Tbilisi anti-homophobia rally protests, where LGBT rights activists clashed with church members and clergy, as well as the International Day Against Homophobia, Biphobia and Transphobia.
26 May	Independence Day	დამოუკიდებლობის დღე	Damouk'ideblobis dghe	On May 26, 1918 National Council of Georgia declared national independence of Georgian people and creation of Democratic Republic of Georgia. The statehood of Georgia was restored after 117 years (from 1801)
28 August	Saint Mary's Day	მარიამობა	Mariamoba	
14 October	Day of Svetitskhoveli Cathedral (in Mtskheta)	სვეტიცხოვლობა	Mtskhetoba (Svetitskovloba)	Celebration of first Christian church in Georgia. According to chronicles, holy chiton (shirt) of Savior is buried under this church.
23 November	Saint George's Day	გიორგობა	Giorgoba	Saint George (in Georgian: წმინდა გიორგი tsminda giorgi) is a patron saint of Georgia

== Sources ==
- National holidays of Georgia - Article 30
