= National Military Appreciation Month =

US national observance

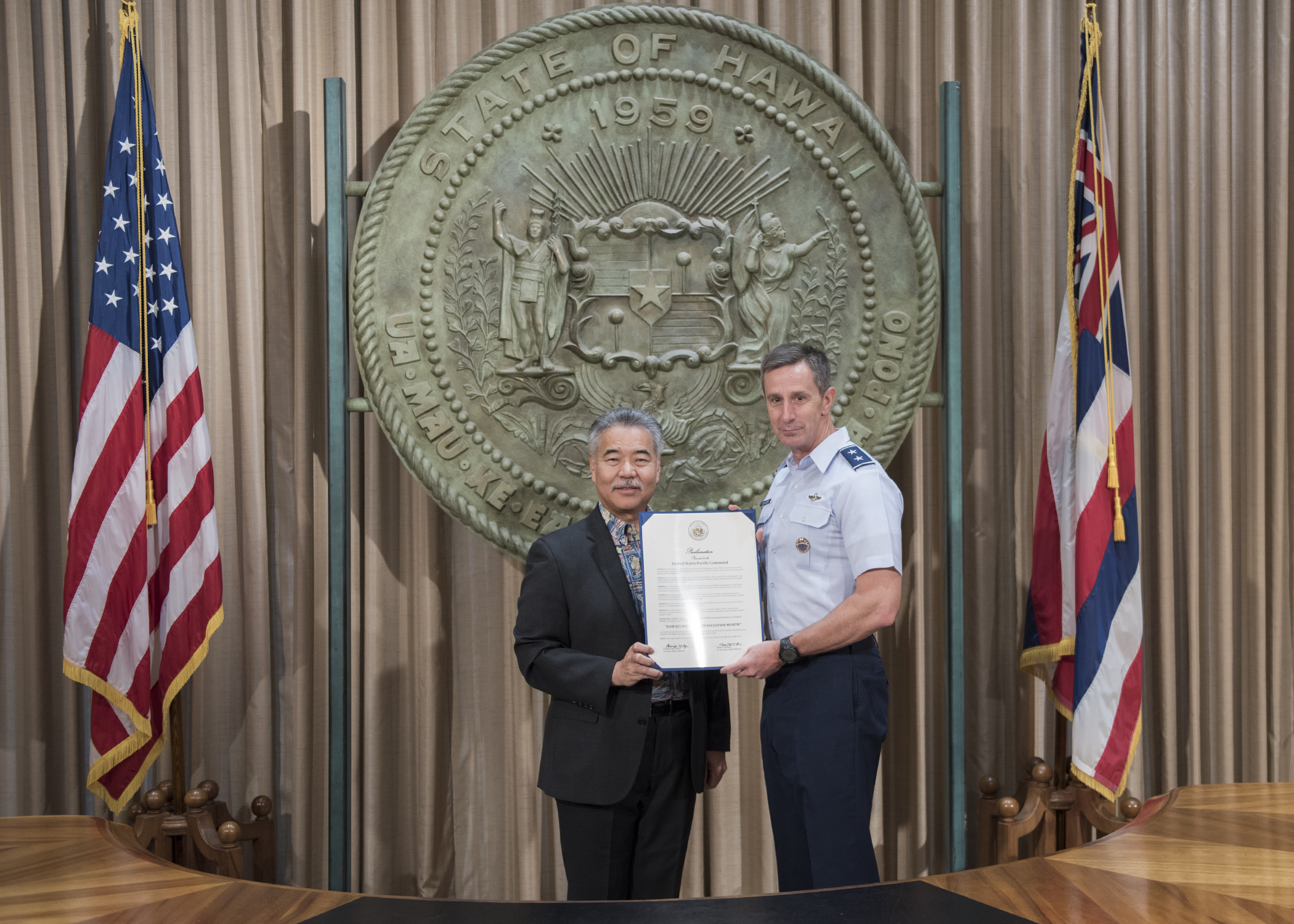
- Governor David Ige presents the Proclamation for Hawaii Military Appreciation Month, to U.S. Air Force Maj. Gen. Kevin Schneider.
- Official name: Military Appreciation Month
- Observed by: United States
- Type: National, Historic
- Significance: Dedicates a month for the recognition and appreciation of active and retired members of the United States Armed Forces
- Observances: Military Spouse Day, Memorial Day, Loyalty Day and Armed Forces Day
- Begins: May 1
- Ends: May 31
- Duration: 1 month
- Frequency: Annual
- Related to: Veterans Day and National Military Family Appreciation Month

National Military Appreciation Month, also known as Military Appreciation Month, is a month-long observance in the United States, dedicated to people who are currently serving in, and veterans of, the United States military. Each year, the observance runs from May 1 to May 31.

== History ==
Senator John McCain proposed the month long observance on February 9, 1999. On April 30, 1999, Congress designated National Military Appreciation Month as a month-long observance. Congress chose May because it contains many military related observances, such as Memorial Day and Loyalty Day. Congress recognized the month after a unanimous vote of 93–0 in April of that year.

== Proclamations ==
Since May 1999, almost all of the states have made proclamations about the month, with the first ones being Arizona, Montana, North Carolina, Washington and Michigan.

== Digital commemorations ==
In the 2020s, videogame company Activision Blizzard created virtual events to celebrate and raise funds for Military Appreciation Month through the video game Call of Duty Warzone.

== Discounts and commemorations ==
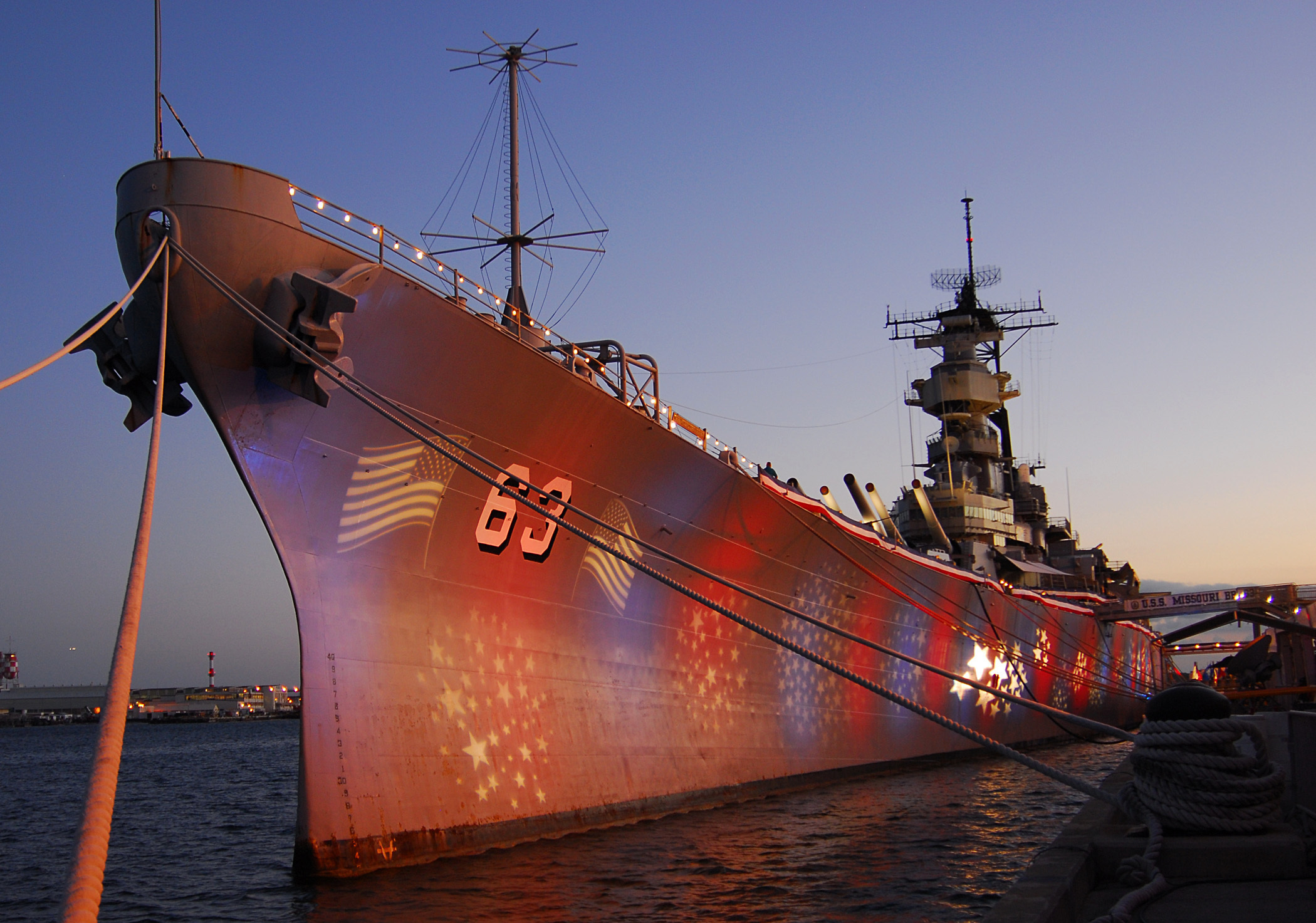
The USS Missouri illuminated in the U.S. flag colors for the 23rd Hawaii Military Appreciation Month opening ceremony

On May 2, 2016, Chevrolet donated $5 million+ worth of cars to the National Navy UDT-SEAL Museum. Multiple companies give discounts to people who currently serve or resigned in the military which include all 6 branches. Some notable companies that give these discounts are Home Depot, Hulu, Lowe's, T-Mobile and Verizon. Some brands only give discounts to veterans on certain days on Military Appreciation Month such as Adidas, Chevrolet, Nike, Chick-fil-A, Ford, Under Armour and IHOP. Many families in the United States thanked the military veterans during the month long observance to show respect. The humanitarian organization known as Red Cross provided more than 15,000 military veteran families during the 2021 Military Appreciation Month to the 2022 Military Appreciation Month. There are also about 50 large companies that give discounts during the month.

Nascar recognized the month during May 2022 through the annual NASCAR Salutes Together with Coca-Cola program. The USS Lexington, also known as The Blue Ghost, made an exhibit about some of the veterans that fought on it during WW2 which the exhibit stayed for the entirety of May 2021 Military Appreciation Month. Education discounts for military are also noticeable during the month long observance. The USS Missouri was illuminated in red, white and blue for the 23rd annual Hawaii Military Appreciation Month opening ceremony. At the California African American Museum, they made an exhibit featuring black soldiers' accomplishments in World War 2.

== Military Appreciation Day ==
Military Appreciation Day is observed on August 31 and has the same idea as the month. Although not as popular as the month, it still is relevant in state fairs. The observation was created in 1949.

== See also ==
- List of month-long observances
