= World Whisky Day =

Annual whisky celebration day

- Status: active
- Date: Third Saturday in May
- Frequency: annually
- Founder: Blair Bowman
- Attendance: 250,000(est.)
- Area: Worldwide
- Organiser: Hot Rum Cow
- Website: World Whisky Day

World Whisky Day was founded in 2012 and falls on the third Saturday in May each year.

== Founding ==
World Whisky Day was founded in 2012 by Blair Bowman while studying at the University of Aberdeen.

== Participation ==
Participants are encouraged to drink whisky on the day at events which may be officially registered on the World Whisky Day website. Others participate via social media using the #worldwhiskyday hashtag.

The organisers estimate that approximately 250,000 people participated in registered events during the 2014 World Whisky Day.

In 2015, World Whisky Day events were registered on all seven continents.

== Sale ==
World Whisky Day's assets were sold in February 2015 to the drinks magazine, Hot Rum Cow.

== Recognition by the Scottish Parliament ==
The day was recognised by Members of the Scottish Parliament in a motion in May 2014 and again in 2015.

== Partnerships ==
A World Whisky Day blend was produced in 2012, 2013 and 2014 by Master of Malt.

The day publicly supports the charitable organization Just a Drop.

== See also ==
- List of food days
- International whisk(e)y day
- National Bourbon Day
