= Public holidays in Haiti =

The following are public holidays in Haiti. Many Vodou holidays are also celebrated, but are not considered public holidays.

The two most important holidays for Haitian Americans are Haitian Independence Day and Haitian Flag Day.

Date	English name	Local name (in French)	Remarks
1 January	New Year's Day and Independence Day	Nouvel an / Jour de l'an / Premier de l'a et Jour de l'Indépendance	Commemorates the day in 1804 when Jean-Jacques Dessalines declared independence and restored the country's native name.
2 January	Ancestry Day	Jour des Aieux	Commemorates Ancestry and other loved ones who have died fighting for freedom.
1 May	Labour and Agriculture Day	Fête du Travail / Fête des Travailleurs	International holiday
18 May	Flag Day and Universities Day	Jour du Drapeau et de l'Université	Celebrates its educational system and commemorates the creation of the flag at the 1803 Arcahaye Conference.
14 August	Bois-Caïman Day	Jour du Bois-Caïman	Commemorates the day in 1791.
15 August	Assumption of Mary	L'Assomption de Marie	Roman Catholic holiday
20 September	Dessalines Day	Jour de Dessalines	Commemorates the birth of Jean-Jacques Dessalines.
17 October	Dessalines Day	Anniversaire de la mort de Dessalines	Commemorates the death of Jean-Jacques Dessalines.
1 November	All Saints' Day	La Toussaint	Roman Catholic holiday; commemorates the sainthood.
2 November	All Souls' Day	Jour des Morts	Roman Catholic holiday; commemorates the faithful departed.
18 November	Battle of Vertières Day	Vertières	Commemorates the victory over the French in the Armed Forces Day in the year 1803.
25 December	Christmas	Noël	Celebrates the nativity of Jesus.

In addition, the following Christian holidays are celebrated; their dates vary according to the date of Easter each year.

Date	Name	Local name (in French)	Remarks
moveable	Carnival Monday	Lundi Gras	
moveable	Carnival Tuesday	Mardi Gras	
moveable	Good Friday	Vendredi saint	
moveable	Corpus Christi	Fête-Dieu	
