= National Hepatitis Testing Day =

Annual observance in the US

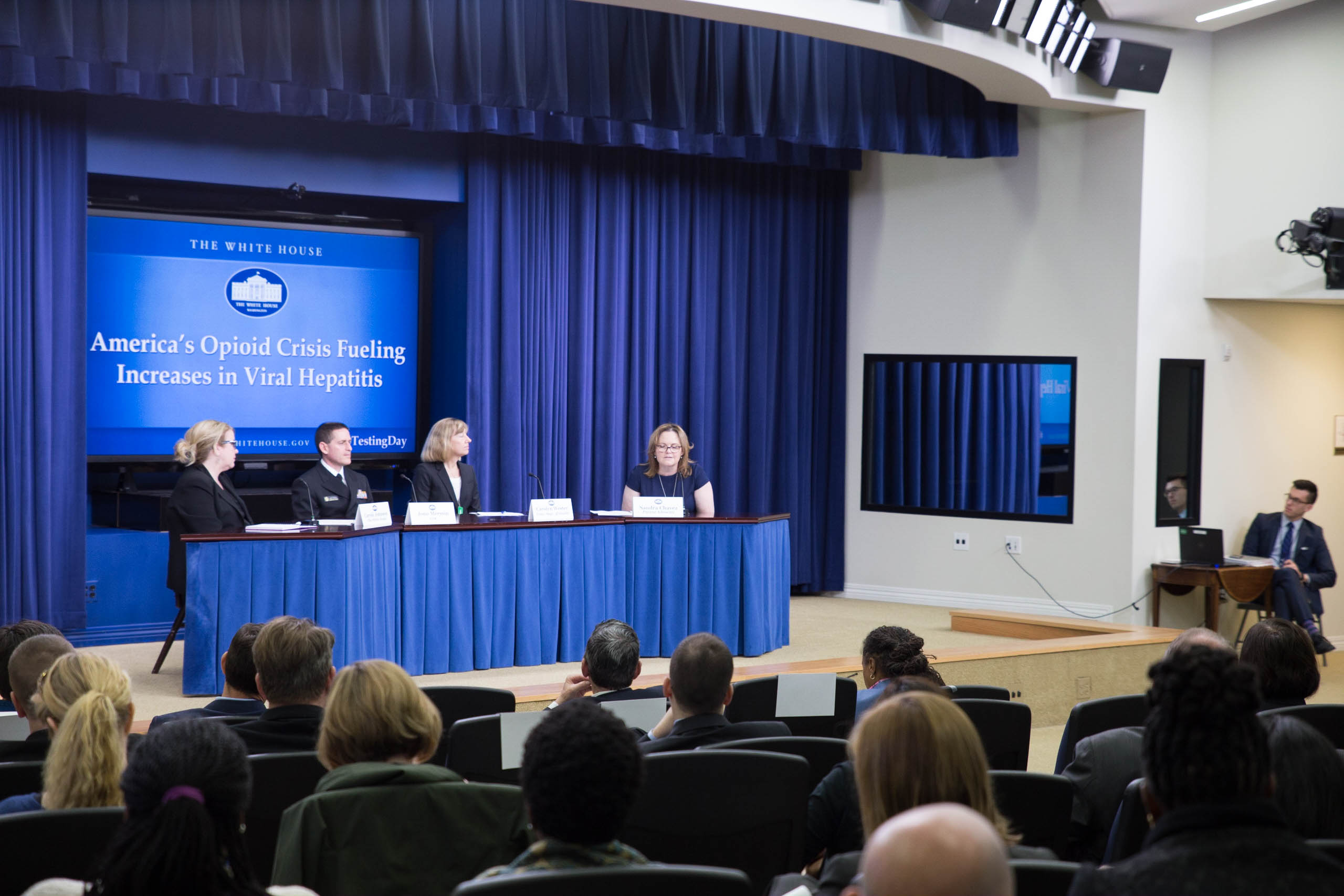
A Hepatitis Testing Day event in 2016

In the United States, National Hepatitis Testing Day falls on May 19. It was first observed in 2012, and became nationally observed the following year.
