= Resistance and Liberation Day (Lebanon) =

National holiday in Lebanon on 25 May

Resistance and Liberation Day (Arabic:عيد المقاومة والتحرير, Eid al-Muqawamat Waltahrir) is a Lebanese holiday celebrated on May 25.

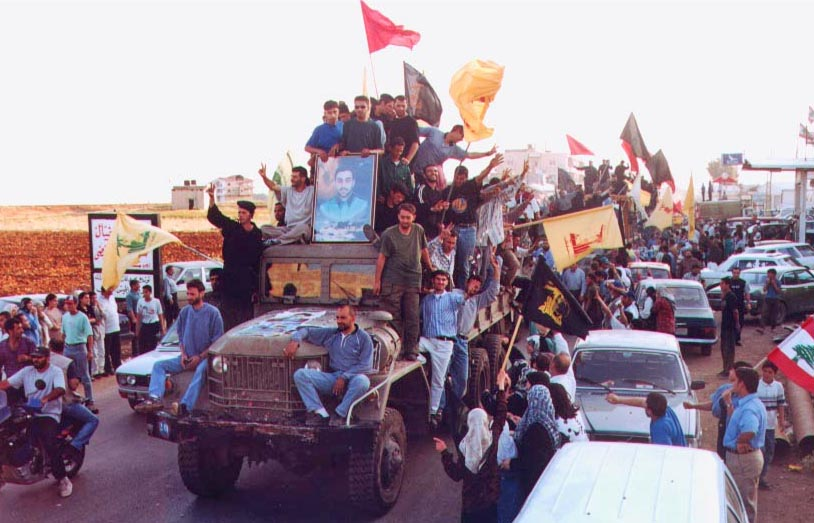
Celebrations in south Lebanon during Liberation Day

On May 25, 2000, the Israeli army withdrew from territory in Southern Lebanon, marking the end of the Occupation of South Lebanon (1985–2000). The withdrawal came after the continued attack on Israeli military positions in occupied Lebanese territory by Lebanese Resistance forced Israeli militias to withdraw. It is celebrated as an important day in the history of Lebanon. The United Nations certified that the withdrawal was complete, with troops having left territory demarcated by the Blue Line. After the Israeli withdrawal the South Lebanon Army, a militia occupying southern Lebanon, collapsed with Hezbollah rapidly advancing and occupying the territory that Israel had withdrawn from. After the Israelis had retreated, Lebanese prime minister Salim al-Hoss declared a public holiday on May 25 to commemorate the end of the occupation.

== Celebrations ==
The holiday is celebrated with parades, rallies, ceremonies, political marches, and speeches especially in the south of Lebanon where the people were most affected by the invasion. It is also celebrated by reconstruction projects in the region, for instance, Lebanese politicians commemorated the occasion in 2007 by announcing the rebuilding of the Zahrani Bridge, a crucial transportation connection devastated in an Israeli bombing in July 2006.

== See also ==
- South Lebanon conflict (1982–2000)
- Israeli-Lebanese conflict
- Liberation Day in other countries
- Shebaa farms
