= Consortium for Selective Schools in Essex =

Examining body in Essex, England

The Consortium of Selective Schools in Essex is the organisation which organises the 11+ examination in Essex, England.

== Consortium Members ==
- Cecil Jones Academy
- Chelmsford County High School for Girls
- Colchester County High School for Girls
- Colchester Royal Grammar School
- King Edward VI Grammar School
- Shoeburyness High School
- Southend High School for Boys
- Southend High School for Girls
- St Bernard's High School
- St Thomas More High School
- Westcliff High School for Boys
- Westcliff High School for Girls
