= Veterans Day (Norway) =

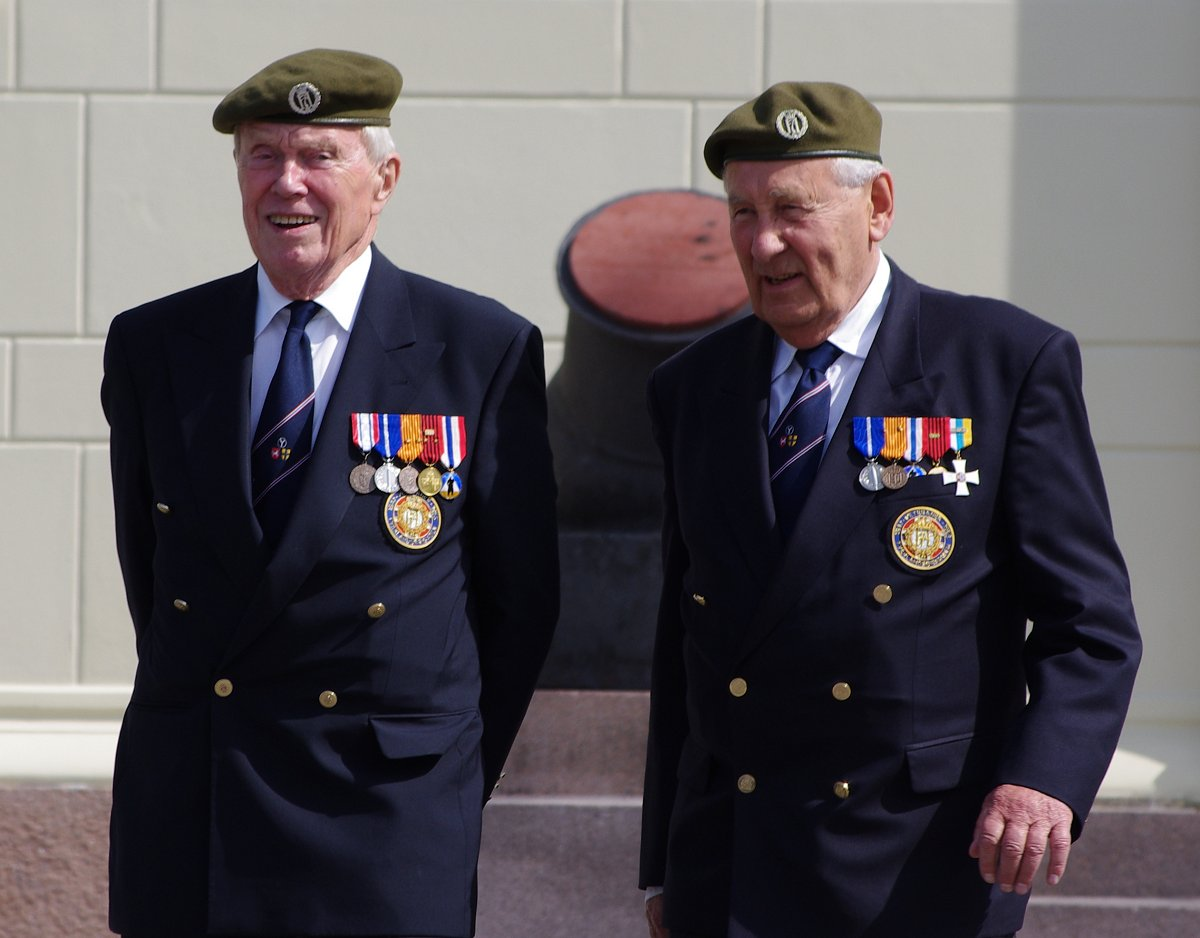
- Two veterans at Veterans Day 2011
- Official name: Norwegian: Veterandagen
- Observed by: Norway
- Date: 8 May
- Next time: 8 May 2026
- Frequency: Annual

Veterans Day (Norwegian: Veterandagen) in Norway on May 8 was first observed in 2011. It recognizes the efforts of veterans of World War II, United Nations peacekeeping initiatives and other international operations.

It was instituted in 2010 by Norway's Cabinet and falls on Victory in Europe Day, May 8. The choice of day has been criticized by Bjørnar Moxnes, leader of political party Rødt, saying one must differentiate between a defensive fight against an occupation force and offensive military operations outside Norway. The Norges Forsvarsforening (NFF), Norwegian Defence Association, wants a debate about the "form and content" of the day.

== See also ==
- Veterans Day
