= North American Occupational Safety and Health Week =

North American Occupational Safety and Health (NAOSH) week is held every year during the first full week of May to raise awareness about occupational safety, health and the environment (OSH&E) in an effort to prevent workplace injuries and illnesses. The American Society of Safety Engineers (ASSE) partners with the Canadian Society of Safety Engineering (CSSE) to raise public awareness about safety in the workplace in North America during NAOSH week.

The goal of NAOSH Week is to bring workers, companies, employers, and other industry professionals together to reduce workplace accidents.

Several organizations and government agencies partner with ASSE to support NAOSH Week, including the Department of Labor’s Occupational Safety and Health Administration (OSHA) and their alliance partners. ASSE honors members who they believe have gone above and beyond in supporting NAOSH week and the profession with the annual ASSE North American Occupational Safety and Health (NAOSH) Week Champion. The awards are presented each year at the ASSE Professional Development Conference.

ASSE members host various classes, symposiums and work safety fairs, and distribute information on such subjects as catastrophe preparedness, roadway crash prevention and teen worker safety. In addition, ASSE assists charities, provides teen worker safety programs, and donates personal protective equipment (PPE) as part of NAOSH Week.

During the months leading up to NAOSH Week, ASSE holds a children's "safety-on-the-job" poster contest (ages 5–14) which supports Society members, and educates children on the importance of workplace safety. The contest runs annually from September 19 through February 14.
