= Haitian Heritage Month =

American annual celebration of Haitian heritage and culture

- Observed by: United States
- Type: Heritage, cultural, ethnic
- Significance: Celebration of Haitian contributions
- Begins: May 1
- Ends: May 31
- Duration: 1 month
- Frequency: annual

Haitian Heritage Month is a celebration in the United States of Haitian heritage and culture. It was first celebrated in Boston, Massachusetts, in 1998.

== History ==
Tele Kreyol, one of the Boston Haitian Access Television programs, celebrated the whole month of May in 1998 with a series of programs on Haitian history, culture, and contributions to the world. The month-long celebration has continued with such activities as parades, flag raisings, and exhibits organized by Haitian-Americans United, Inc. (H.A.U.) in collaboration with several Haitian organizations in the New England area.

The Haitian community of Palm Beach County, Florida, which started its Heritage celebration in 2001, contributed greatly to make the Heritage Month first a statewide celebration, and then, a national one in the United States. South Florida congressman Kendrick B. Meek introduced unsuccessfully a bill in the United States House of Representatives in 2004 and 2006 to recognize the month of May as Haitian-American Heritage Month in the United States. President George W. Bush and his wife Laura Bush sent a letter in May 2005 to congratulate the Haitian-American community for the heritage month and organized a celebration at the White House the same year.

Since 1998, several governors, members of state senates and houses of representatives, mayors and city councilors have issued annual citations and proclamations, recognizing the Haitian Heritage Month celebration in their states or cities.

== Celebrations ==
In 2008, the Haitian Heritage Month/Flag Day was celebrated with parades, festivals, schools activities, and flag raising ceremonies in the following cities and counties in the U.S.:

Connecticut

- Norwich

Florida

- Broward County
- Delray Beach
- Palm Beach
- Miami Beach
- Miami Dade County
- Miramar
- North Miami
- Orlando
- Tampa
- Ft. Lauderdale
- Boca Raton
- Collier County
- Palm Bay

Georgia

- Atlanta

Illinois

- Chicago

Massachusetts

- Boston
- Brockton
- Cambridge
- Lawrence
- Malden
- Waltham

New Jersey

- Irvington
- Trenton

New Hampshire

- Manchester

New York

- Brooklyn
- Spring Valley
- Westbury, New York
- Elmont, New York

Pennsylvania

- Philadelphia

Rhode Island

- Providence

Virginia

- Roanoke

== Description ==
The Haitian Heritage Month celebration is an expansion of the Haitian Flag Day, a major patriotic day celebration in Haiti and the Diaspora. Haitian President Dumarsais Estimé started the Flag Day celebration with parades, cultural and athletic events in many cities in Haiti in the 1930s, when he was minister of education under President Sténio Vincent. Estime wanted to commemorate annually the creation of the Haitian flag on May 18 to encourage the development of patriotic sentiments among Haitian youth.

Beside the Flag Day celebration, the month of May carries a number of significant historical and cultural traditions that Haitians are proud to make aware of and to pass on to future generations. In Haiti, May 1 is celebrated as Labor and Agriculture Day. May 2 used to be Flower Day. The Congress of Arcahaie that united black and mulatto officers to fight together for Haiti's independence is remembered from May 15 through 18. The revolutionary general, Toussaint Louverture, was born on May 20, 1743. Teacher's Day is May 17, University Day May 18, and Mother's Day is celebrated on the last Sunday of May. For Haitian Catholics, May is the month of Mary, the mother of Jesus.

Haitian Flag Day is at the center of Haitian Heritage Month on May 18 each year. It was coined as an official commemoration to the fallen soldiers who helped the United States and many other Western colonized countries gain their freedom and independence. The Artist Known as Koolkat whose debut song called "Zoe Flag" hit the charts in 2019 honored the celebration officially. Koolkat who is from South Florida, the most populated Haitian communities in the U.S., cited in a radio interview how Kodak Black, Wyclef, Pras, and Tony Yayo are only a few of Haitian artists who are making a mark in the entertainment industry. The Models, actors, athletes, writers and innovators of all industries are proud to contribute greatness around the world to continue a legacy of freedom fighters and justice for all. In the song "Zoe Flag" Koolkat portrays Haitians to be resilient and rich regardless of financial situations by stating "They know my style they know my island got a history. When drama comes we overcome it with a victory". The Haitian pride is one that is not understood so artists and other leaders support and contribute towards Haitian Heritage month so that the story may live on.
