= Canadian Society of Safety Engineering =

Canadian safety association

The Canadian Society of Safety Engineering is a Canadian association which promotes accident prevention. It was founded in 1949 by a small group of individuals drawn together in the common cause of accident prevention. It grew from a provincially based organization to become a large professional organization for health and safety practitioners.

Today, the society has over 5,000 members across Canada, the United States, and around the world. It supports the operation of 35 local chapters, which provide a local forum for information exchange and networking among professionals. Through chapter meetings and activities, members promote and enhance the profile of the profession in communities throughout Canada.

The mission of the society is to be the resource for professional development, knowledge and information exchange to its members, its profession and the Canadian public.

Certified Health and Safety Consultant This designation is awarded to health and safety professionals who have met certain academic and experience requirements and passed a series of examinations designed to test knowledge of occupational health and safety.

It promotes active participation of members, individuals and organizations during North American Occupational Safety and Health Week, which, along with its strategic partners, seeks to raise awareness of occupational safety and health. It holds an annual conference.
