= June =

Sixth month in the Julian and Gregorian calendars

<<	June					>>
Su	Mo	Tu	We	Th	Fr	Sa
	1	2	3	4	5	6
7	8	9	10	11	12	13
14	15	16	17	18	19	20
21	22	23	24	25	26	27
28	29	30
2026

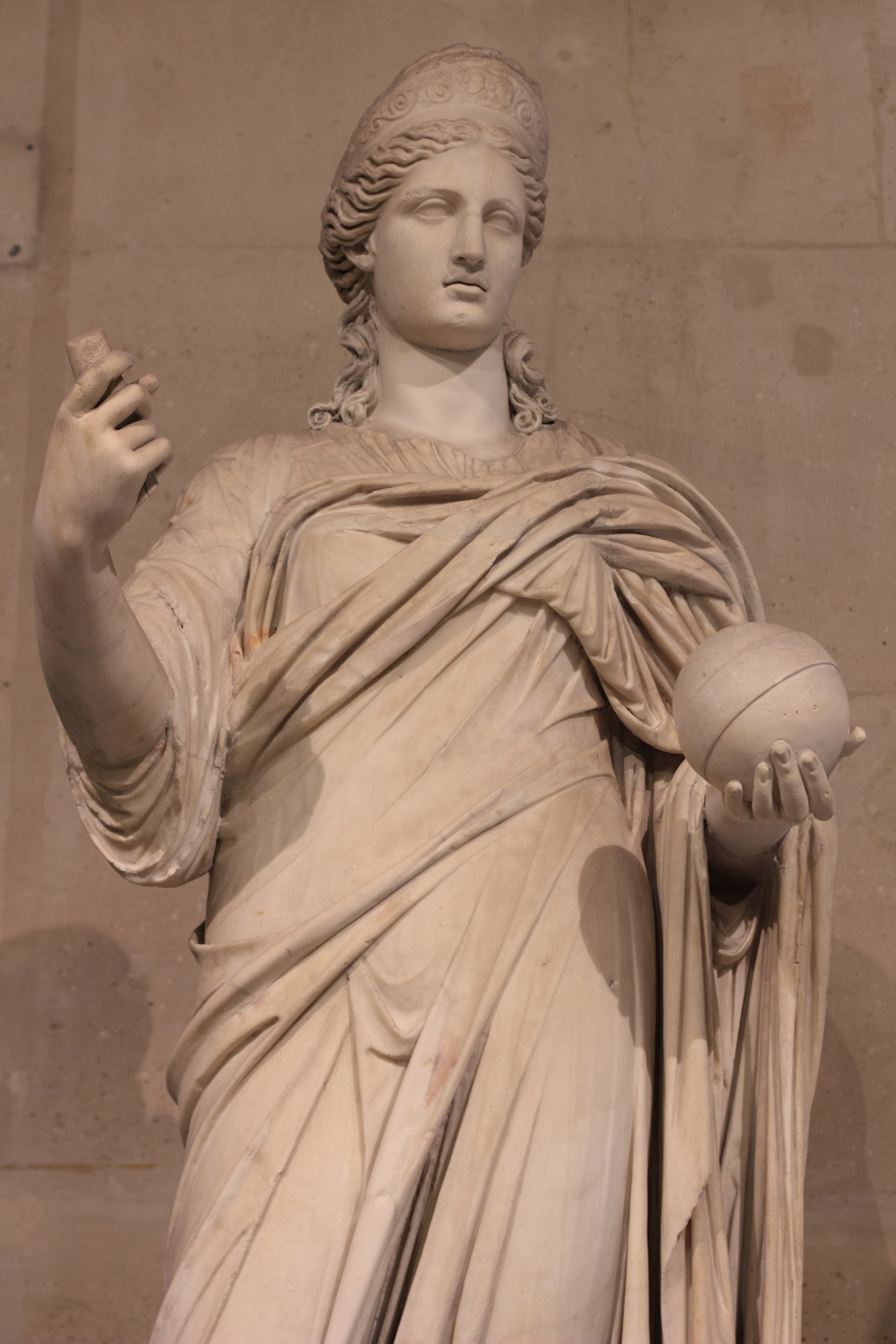
The Roman goddess Juno, after whom the month is named

June is the sixth month of the year in the Julian and Gregorian calendars—the latter the most widely used calendar in the world. Its length is 30 days. June succeeds May and precedes July. This month marks the start of summer in the Northern Hemisphere and contains the summer solstice, which is the day with the most daylight hours. In the Southern Hemisphere, June is the start of winter and contains the winter solstice, the day with the fewest hours of daylight out of the year.

In places north of the Arctic Circle, the June solstice is when the midnight sun occurs, during which the Sun remains visible even at midnight. The Atlantic hurricane season—when tropical or subtropical cyclones are most likely to form in the north Atlantic Ocean—begins on 1 June and lasts until 30 November. Several monsoons and subsequent wet seasons also commence in the Northern Hemisphere during this month. Multiple meteor showers occur annually in June, including the Arietids, which are among the most intense daylight meteor showers of the year; they last between 22 May and 2 July, peaking in intensity on 8 June.

Numerous observances take place in June. Midsummer, the celebration of the summer solstice in the Northern Hemisphere, is celebrated in several countries. In Catholicism, this month is dedicated to the devotion of the Sacred Heart of Jesus, and known as the Month of the Sacred Heart. In the United States, June is dedicated to Pride Month, a month-long observance of the LGBTQ community. Father's Day, which honours fathers and fatherhood, occurs on the third Sunday in June in most countries.

== Overview ==
June is the sixth month of the year in the Julian and Gregorian calendars—the latter the most widely used calendar in the world. Containing 30 days, June succeeds May and precedes July. It is one of four months that have 30 days—alongside April, September and November—and is the second 30-day month of the year, following April, the fourth month of the year, and preceding September—the ninth month of the year. June is in the second quarter (Q2) of a calendar year, alongside April and May, and the sixth and final month in the first half of the year (January–June). Under the ISO week date system, June incidentally begins in either the 22nd or 23rd week of the year.

During each calendar year, no other month starts on the same day of the week as June. The Julian calendar—which also has June and is still used as a ceremonial religious calendar by some of the Eastern Orthodox Church and Oriental Orthodoxy—is 13 days behind the Gregorian calendar. Thus, in this calendar, 1 June begins on 14 June. It will be 14 days behind in 2100. June is abbreviated as Jun, and may be spelled with or without a concluding period (full stop).

=== Etymology ===
June is ultimately derived from the Latin month of Iunius, named after the ancient Roman goddess Juno (Latin: Iūnō). The present English spelling was influenced by the Anglo-Norman join, junye and junie. It was also written in Middle English as Iun and Juin, while the spelling variant Iune was in use until the 17th century. It displaced the Old English name for June, ærra liþa.

== History ==
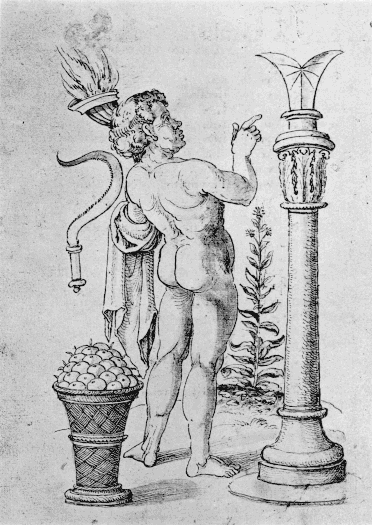
Illustration for the month of June, based on the Calendar of Filocalus (AD 354)

In recent decades, the number of warm temperature records in June has outpaced cold temperature records over a growing portion of Earth's surface.

Chart shows changes in global average temperature annually in June of each year

June originates from the month of Iunius (also called mensis Iunius lit. 'month of June') in the original Roman calendar used during the Roman Republic. The origin of this calendar is obscure. (Note: The Romans usually described their first calendar, predating the Roman calendar, as one with ten fixed months—four "full months" (pleni menses) with 31 days and six "hollow months" (cavi menses) of 30 days, the latter including Iunius. Later Roman writers usually credited this calendar to Romulus, their legendary first king, around 738 BC. Nevertheless, this early version of the Roman calendar has not been attested, and a number of scholars doubt the existence of this calendar at all.) Iunius was originally the fourth month of the year, and had 29 days alongside Aprilis ("April"), Sextilis (later renamed Augustus "August"), September, November and December. It is not known when the Romans reset the course of the year so that Ianuarius ("January") and Februarius ("February"), originally the 11th and 12th months respectively, came first—thus moving Iunius to the sixth month of the year—but later Roman scholars generally dated this to 153 BC.

In ancient Rome, the period from mid-May through mid-June may have been considered inauspicious for marriages. The Roman poet Ovid claimed to have consulted the flaminica Dialis, the high priestess of the god Jupiter, about setting a date for his daughter's wedding, but was advised to wait until after 15 June. The Greek philosopher and writer Plutarch, however, implied that the entire month of June was more favorable for weddings than May.

In 46 BC, Julius Caesar reformed the calendar, which thus became known as the Julian calendar after himself. This reform fixed the calendar to 365 days with a leap year every fourth year, and made June 30 days long; however, this reform resulted in the average year of the Julian calendar being 365.25 days long, slightly more than the actual solar year of 365.2422 days (the current value, which varies).

In AD 65, June was renamed as Germanicus in honour of the Roman emperor Nero. As recalled by the Roman historian Tacitus in his Annals, the Roman senator Cornelius Orfitus, who made the proposal, claimed that the name Junius had become inauspicious due to the executions of Lucius Junius Silanus Torquatus and Decimus Junius Silanus Torquatus in AD 49 and AD 64, respectively. The names did not survive and were likely erased when Nero was subjected to damnatio memoriae. In AD 184, Roman Emperor Commodus briefly renamed all of the months after a name in his full title; June became Aelius. However, this decision was repealed after his death in AD 192.

In 1582, Pope Gregory XIII promulgated a revised calendar—the Gregorian calendar—that reduced the average length of the calendar year from 365.25 days to 365.2425, correcting the Julian calendar's drift against the solar year.

== Climate, daylight and astronomy ==
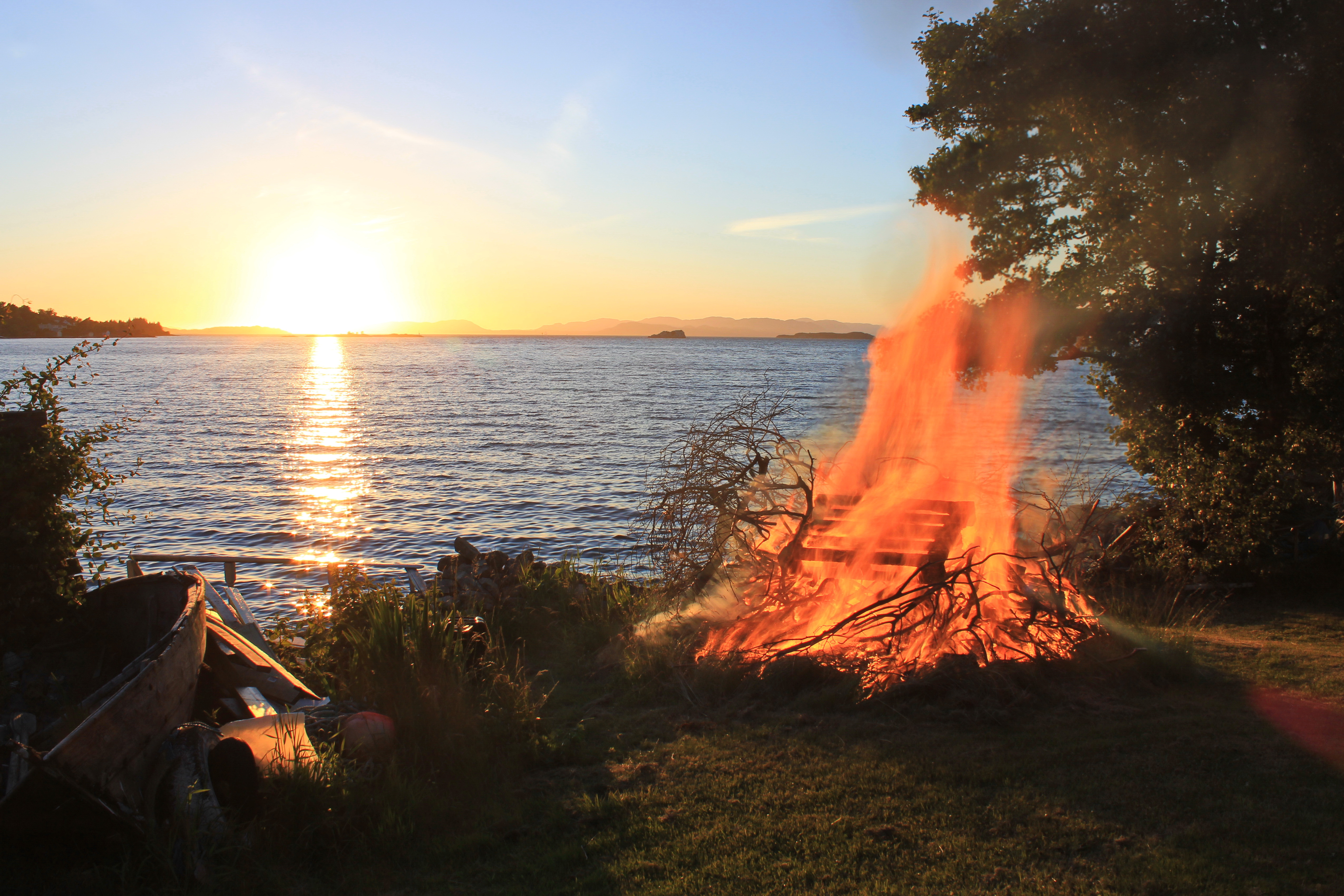
The celebration of Midsummer (the June solstice) in Norway with a bonfire

In the Northern Hemisphere, June marks the commencement of summer, while in the Southern Hemisphere, it is the start of winter. In the Northern Hemisphere, the beginning of the traditional astronomical summer is 21 June, while meteorological summer commences on 1 June. In the Southern Hemisphere, astronomical winter starts on 21 June while meteorological winter begins on 1 June.

The June solstice—known as the summer solstice in the Northern Hemisphere and winter solstice in the Southern Hemisphere—occurs for one-day between 20–22 June (most often on 21 June), marking the longest day of the year in terms of daylight hours in the Northern Hemisphere and the shortest day in the Southern Hemisphere. In places north of the Arctic Circle, this is when the midnight sun occurs for the longest period, during which the Sun remains visible even at midnight. Conversely, it is polar night in places within the Antarctic Circle, during which the Sun remains below the horizon for more than 24 hours.

In astronomy, certain meteor showers occur annually during this month. The Arietids—among the most intense daylight meteor showers of the year—last from 22 May until 2 July, peaking in intensity on 8 June; the Beta Taurids take place between 5 June and 18 July, peaking on 28 June; and the June Bootids commence between 22 June and 2 July, peaking on 27 June. The full moon that occurs in June (Note: Because it takes the Moon approximately 29.5 days to go through all of its lunar phases, this results in there usually being one full moon for every month of the year. Culturally, each full moon has its own name corresponding to the month in which it appears.) is most commonly known as the strawberry moon because it coincides with the strawberry-picking season; other names for it include the rose moon, honey moon and the poetic midsummer moon.

=== Climate ===
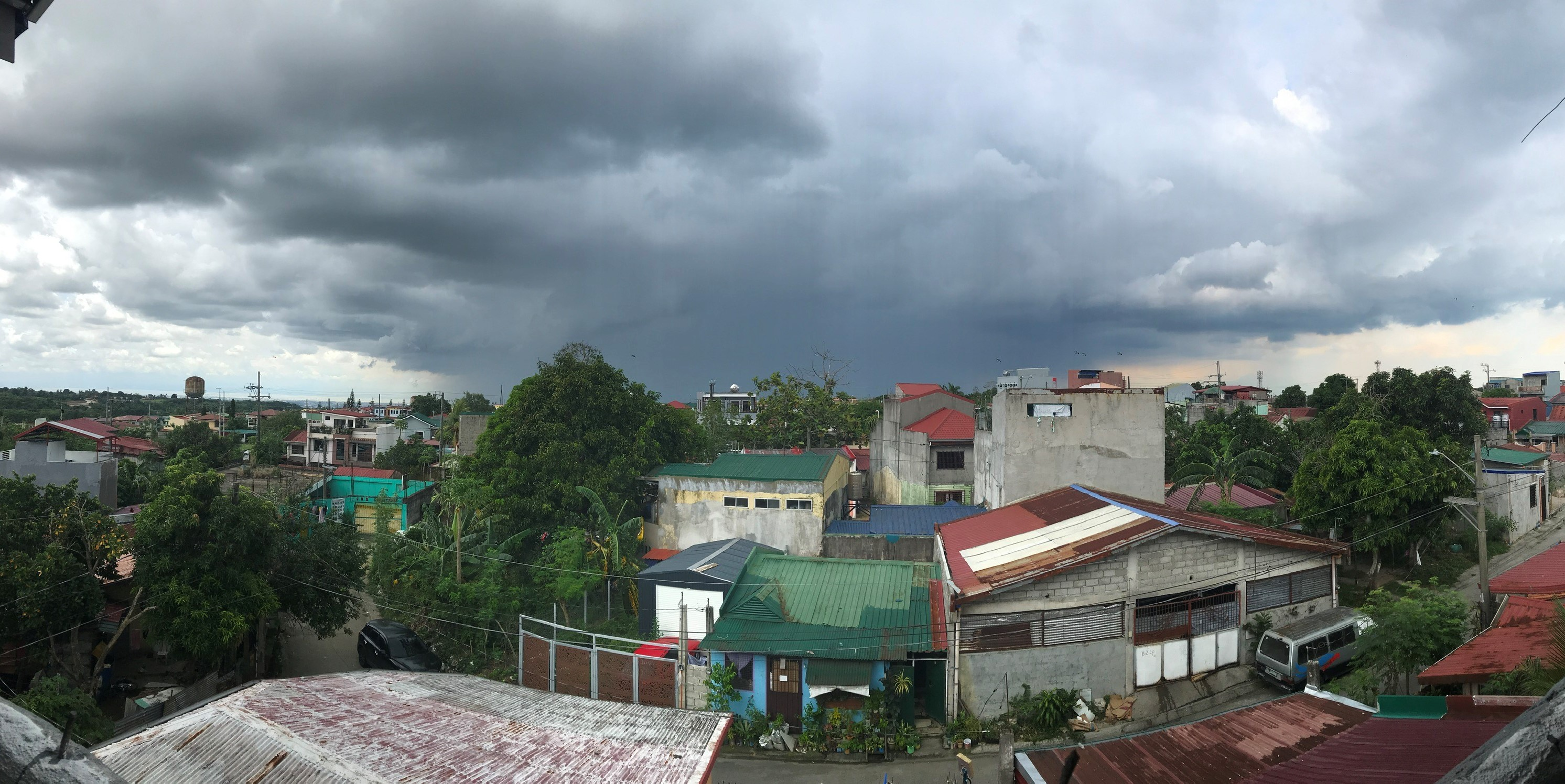
Summer thunderstorm in the Philippines during monsoon season, 3 June 2023

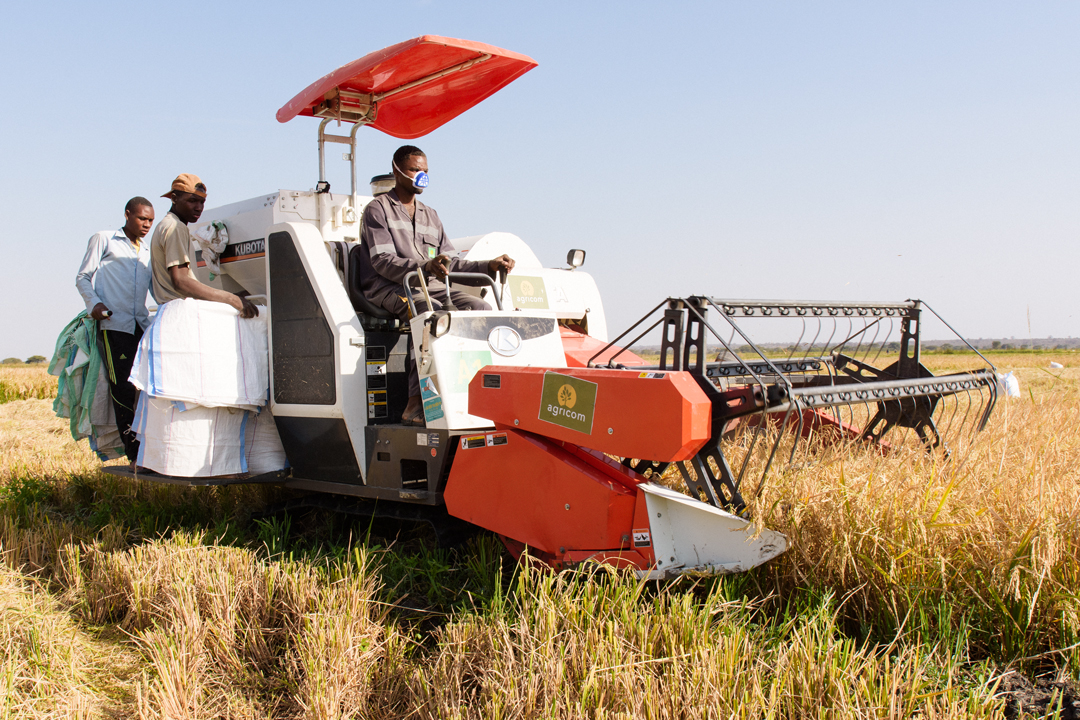
Rice being harvested in Igunga, Tabora Region, Tanzania on 10 June 2016 (Note: In Tanzania, rice is harvested between May and July.)

June is one of the hottest months in the Northern Hemisphere, alongside July and August, with July being the hottest; in the Southern Hemisphere, it is the inverse. For instance, the lowest temperature ever recorded in South America occurred on 1 June 1907 in the town of Sarmiento in the Chubut Province of Argentina, measuring -32.8°C (-27°F). June 2024 was the hottest June in recorded history at 1.22°C (2.20°F) above the 20th-century global average, beating the previous record held by June 2023.

The Atlantic hurricane season—when tropical or subtropical cyclones are most likely to form in the north Atlantic Ocean—begins on 1 June and lasts until 30 November. In the Indian Ocean north of the equator, around the Indian subcontinent, year-round tropical cyclones appear frequently between May and June. In contrast, Mediterranean tropical-like cyclones are least likely to form in June because of the dry season of the Mediterranean having stable air.

The East Asian, North American, South Asian (Indian) and West African monsoons generally begin in June, while the European monsoon season intensifies that month. The East Asian monsoon commences the East Asian rainy season. The highest volume of rainfall ever recorded in a one-hour period occurred on 22 June 1947 in the small city of Holt, Missouri in the United States, measuring 305 mm (12 inches) of rainfall. The greatest rainfall within a 48-hour period occurred between 15–16 June 1995 in the town of Cherrapunji in Meghalaya, India, with 2.493 metres (98.15 inches) of rainfall recorded.

=== Agriculture ===
The crops which are harvested this month include several varieties of corn; wheat, barley, maize, rapeseed, rice, rye and sorghum in most of the Northern Hemisphere, and maize, cotton, pearl millet, sorghum and soybeans in most of the Southern Hemisphere. In much of the Northern Hemisphere, apricots, blackberries, blueberries, cherries, mangoes, raspberries, strawberries and watermelons are fruits which are considered to be in season or at their peak in June. Vegetables that are in season in this hemisphere during June include asparagus, beetroot, cucumbers, lettuce, peas, radishes, spinach, tomatoes and zucchini (courgettes). In much of the Southern Hemisphere, the fruits which are in season are avocados, bananas, citrus (such as grapefruit, lemons, mandarins and oranges), kiwifruit and pears.

== Observances ==
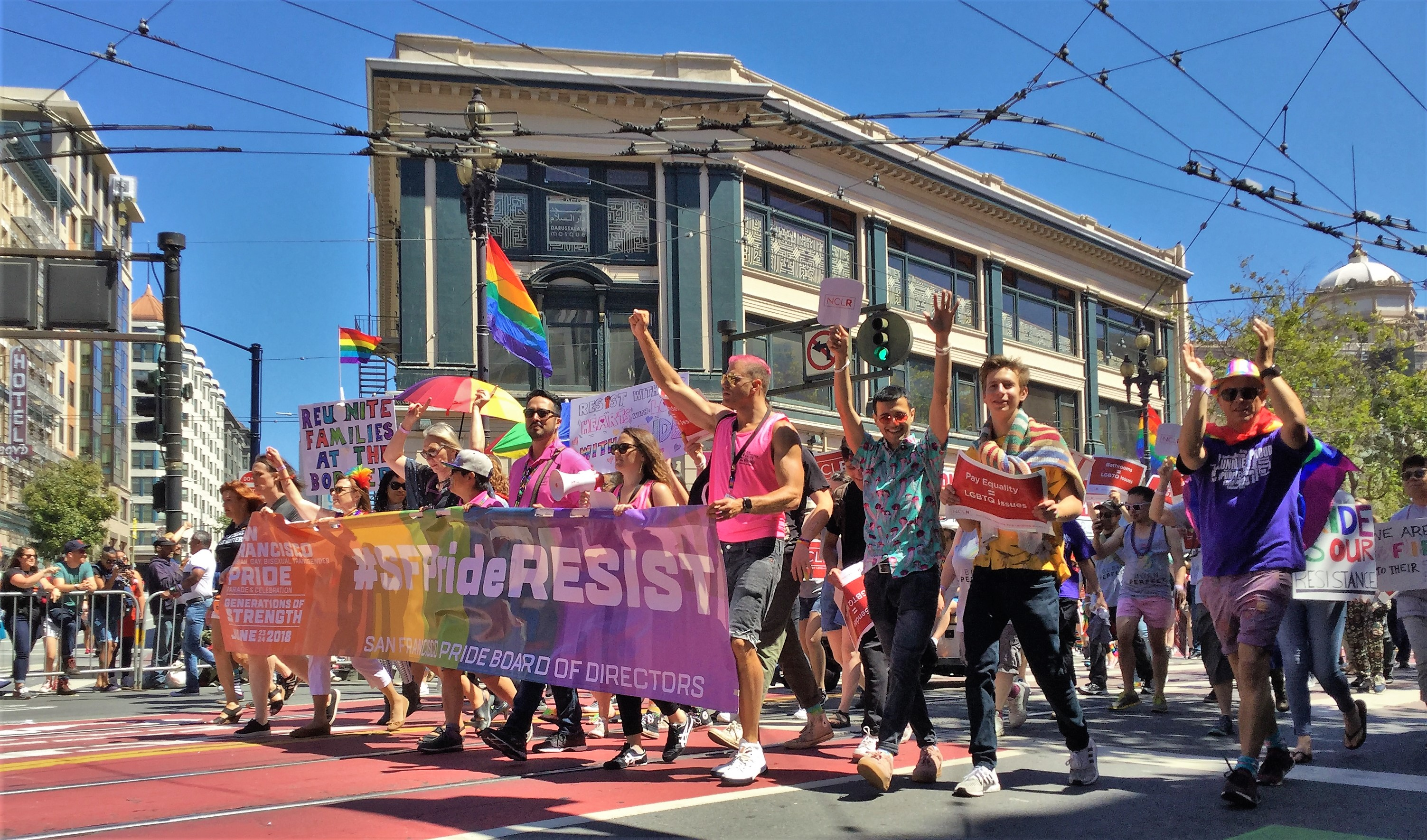
In the United States, June is Pride Month (2018 annual San Francisco Gay Pride Parade pictured)

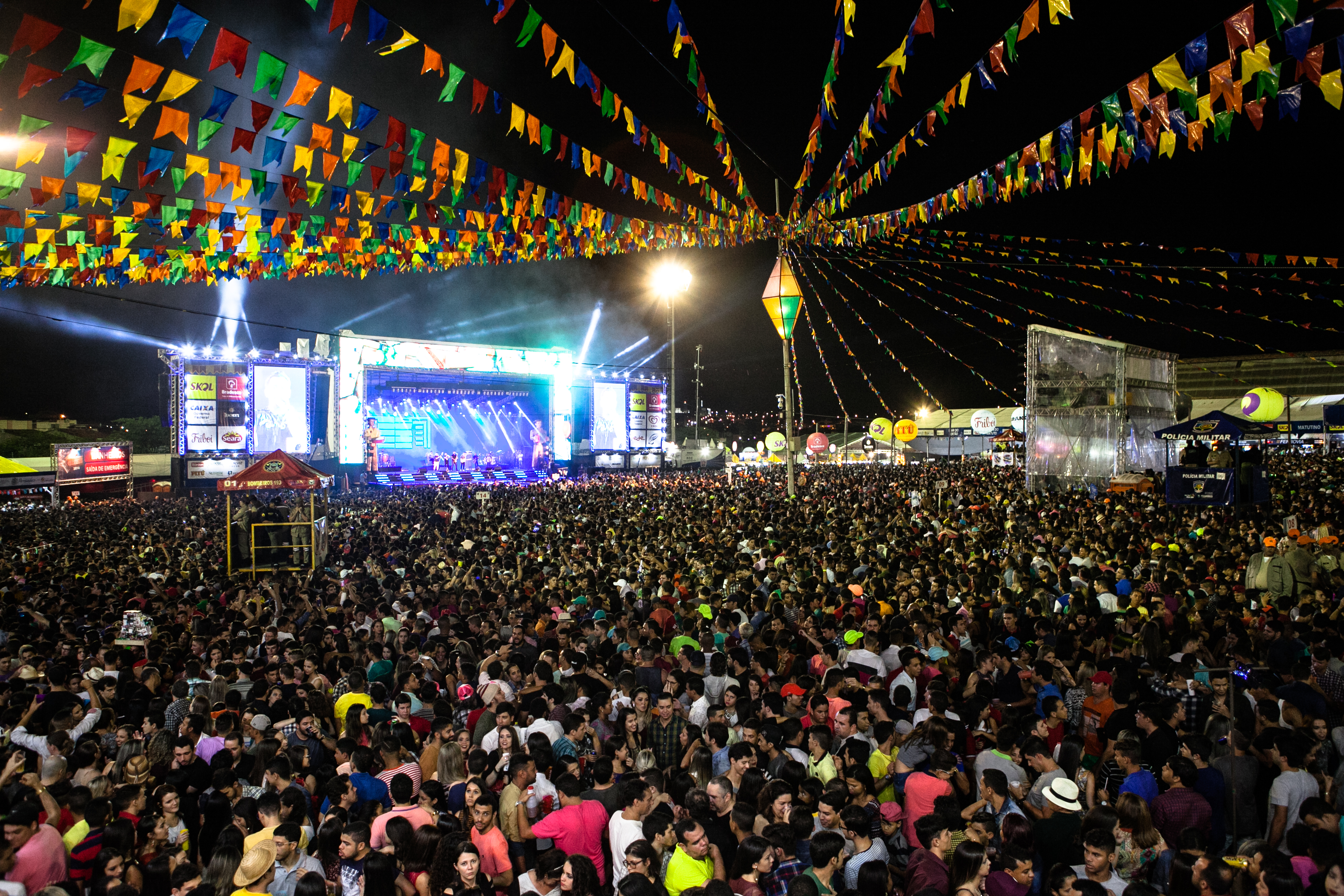
Festas Juninas (June Festivals) celebration in Pernambuco, Brazil

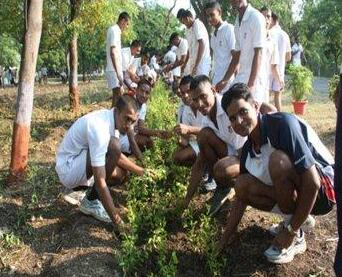
People celebrating World Environment Day in India

In Catholicism, June is dedicated to the devotion of the Sacred Heart of Jesus. This observance is called the Month of the Sacred Heart. In Canada, June is ALS Awareness Month, a campaign to spread awareness and raise funds for a cure for amyotrophic lateral sclerosis, and Filipino Heritage Month. In the United States, June is Pride Month, which is the celebration of the LGBTQ community. Caribbean-American Heritage Month also occurs annually in June. In Brazil, the Festas Juninas (June Festivals) occur throughout the entire month to celebrate the harvest.

It is also National Safety Month in the United States, a month-long observance aimed at increasing awareness of, and ultimately decreasing, the number of unintentional injuries and deaths in the country. National Smile Month, the largest oral health campaign in the United Kingdom and organised by the Oral Health Foundation, commences between alternating dates from mid-May to mid-June. In Barbados, June is part of the Season of Emancipation which takes place between 14 April and 23 August to commemorate the emancipation of slaves of African descent.

=== Global single-day observances ===
The first day of June commences with World Milk Day and International Children's Day in several countries. (Note: Some countries observe Children's Day on different dates, including 20 November.) International Whores' Day, an observance to honour sex workers (prostitutes) and recognise their often exploited and poor working conditions, occurs on 2 June. Several memorials and other commemorations are held around the world on 4 June to honour the 1989 Tiananmen Square protests and massacre that occurred in China. Similar annual memorials are held for the Normandy landings (D-Day), the largest seaborne invasion in history, which occurred on 6 June 1944 as part of the Second World War. Global Wind Day is on 15 June, and on 16 June is the International Day of the African Child, which raises awareness for the need of improved education provided to children in Africa. Autistic Pride Day occurs on 18 June.

19 June is World Sauntering Day, which encourages people to slow down ("saunter") and enjoy life. Go Skateboarding Day and World Hydrography Day both occur on 21 June. Midsummer, the various celebrations of the commencement of summer, happens on 21 June; it is also associated with the Fête de la Musique (World Music Day). 25 June is the observation of World Vitiligo Day, which aims to decrease negative sentiments regarding vitiligo—a chronic autoimmune disorder that causes patches of skin to lose pigment or colour. 26 June is World Refrigeration Day.

Global Running Day occurs on the first Wednesday in June. Father's Day, which honours fathers and fatherhood, most often occurs on the third Sunday in June. (Note: Some countries also observe Father's Day at different dates in June.) The King's Official Birthday, which celebrates the birthday of the monarch of the Commonwealth realms (presently Charles III), occurs in either May or June. It includes the British Trooping the Colour commemoration. The Dragon Boat Festival, observed in China and by the Chinese communities of Southeast Asia, may commence for one-day between late May and mid-June as the date is decided by the traditional Chinese lunisolar calendar.

==== United Nations ====
The following are global holidays which are formally observed by the United Nations:

- 1 June: Global Day of Parents
- 3 June: World Bicycle Day
- 4 June: International Day of Innocent Children Victims of Aggression
- 5 June: World Environment Day and International Day for the Fight Against Illegal, Unreported and Unregulated Fishing
- 6 June: UN Russian Language Day
- 7 June: World Food Safety Day
- 8 June: World Oceans Day
- 10 June: International Day for Dialogue Among Civilizations
- 11 June: International Day of Play
- 12 June: World Day Against Child Labour
- 13 June: International Albinism Awareness Day
- 14 June: World Blood Donor Day
- 15 June: World Elder Abuse Awareness Day
- 16 June: International Day of Family Remittances
- 17 June: World Day to Combat Desertification and Drought
- 18 June: International Day for Countering Hate Speech and Sustainable Gastronomy Day
- 19 June: International Day for the Elimination of Sexual Violence in Conflict
- 20 June: World Refugee Day
- 21 June: International Day of Yoga and International Day of the Celebration of the Solstice
- 23 June: United Nations Public Service Day and International Widows' Day
- 24 June: International Day of Women in Diplomacy
- 25 June: Day of the Seafarer
- 26 June: International Day Against Drug Abuse and Illicit Trafficking and International Day in Support of Victims of Torture
- 27 June: Micro-, Small and Medium-sized Enterprises Day
- 29 June: International Day of the Tropics
- 30 June: International Asteroid Day and International Day of Parliamentarism

==== Religious single-day observances ====
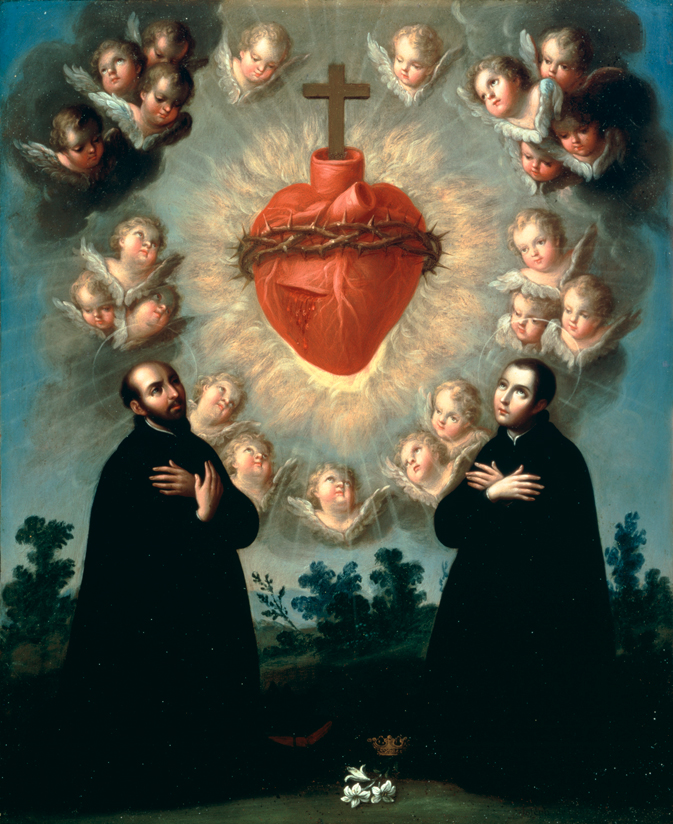
The Feast of the Sacred Heart occurs in June during the Month of the Sacred Heart

As Easter is celebrated on the first Sunday after the Paschal full moon, which is the first full moon on or after 21 March (a fixed approximation of the March equinox), Ascension Day, observed 39 days after Easter, can occur in June. Pentecost is the fiftieth day after Easter Sunday, while Trinity Sunday is the first Sunday after Pentecost. The Catholic Church also observes the Feast of the Sacred Heart, which happens on the Friday following the second Sunday after Pentecost. The Feast of Corpus Christi, observed by the Latin Church and certain Western Orthodox, Lutheran, and Anglican churches, takes place on the Thursday after Trinity Sunday. The feast of the Nativity of Saint John the Baptist is observed annually on 24 June. The feast of Saints Peter and Paul, a liturgical feast observed by numerous denominations, always occurs on 29 June.

In Buddhism, Vesak (Buddha Day), the most significant Buddhist festival, occurs on 2 June in Singapore and on 3 June in Thailand as of 2024. Shavuot, one of the biblically-ordained Three Pilgrimage Festivals observed in Judaism, takes place during the month of Sivan in the Hebrew calendar, which corresponds to being between May and June in the Gregorian calendar. Islamic holidays are determined by the Hijri calendar (colloquially the Islamic calendar), a lunar calendar of 354 or 355 days; thus, Islamic observances do not align with those of the Gregorian calendar. This is the same for Hindu holidays, which are based on the Hindu calendar.

=== Other events ===
The quadrennial FIFA World Cup, an international association football tournament and the most-watched sporting event on television, usually commences in June. The annual Wimbledon Championships, the oldest tennis tournament in the world and widely regarded as the most prestigious, traditionally occurred on the last Monday in June. Glastonbury Festival, a major music festival in the United Kingdom, also takes place in June, attracting over 100,000 attendees.

== People ==
June is a female given name that can be given to a person born in June. In astrology, the Zodiac signs for people born between 21 May and 21 June is Gemini (♊︎); for those born between 22 June and 22 July, their sign is Cancer (♋︎). The birthstones associated with June in the United States are pearl, moonstone and alexandrite. The birth flowers of June are rose and honeysuckle.

=== Births ===
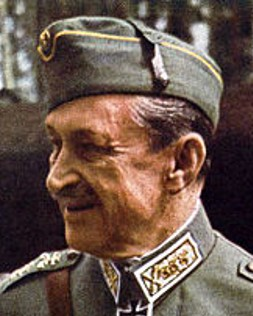
C. G. E. Mannerheim was born on 4 June 1867

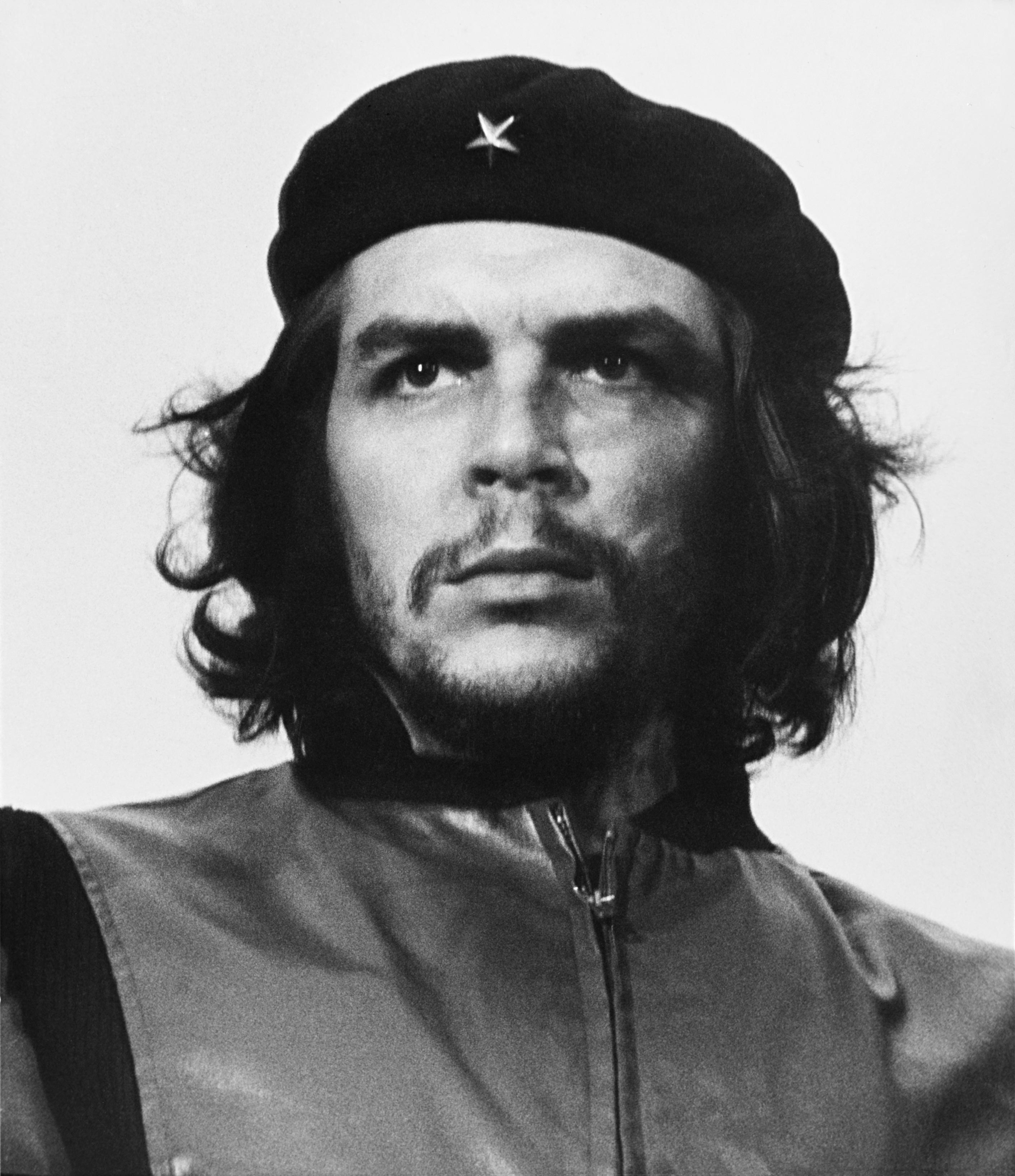
Che Guevara was born on 14 June 1928

Henry VIII was born on 28 June 1491

Noteworthy people born in June include: (Note: Attributed to various sources:)

- 1st – Frank Whittle, English engineer and Royal Air Force air officer who invented the turbojet engine (1907).
- 4th – Baron Carl Gustaf Emil Mannerheim, Finnish military commander and statesman, known as the Marshal of Finland and the sixth President of Finland (1867).
- 8th – Tim Berners-Lee, English computer scientist who invented the World Wide Web (1955).
- 9th:
  - Leopold I, Holy Roman Emperor and King of Hungary, Croatia, and Bohemia (1640).
  - Peter the Great, Tsar and later the first Emperor of all Russia (1627).
- 14th – Che Guevara, Argentine Marxist revolutionary, guerrilla leader, diplomat and military theorist; a major figure of the Cuban Revolution (1928).
- 17th – Igor Stravinsky, Russian composer (1882).
- 18th – Paul McCartney, English singer, songwriter and musician, former member of the Beatles (1942).
- 19th – José Rizal, Filipino nationalist, writer and polymath, a national hero (pambansang bayani) of the Philippines (1861).
- 23rd – Alan Turing, English mathematician, computer scientist, logician, cryptanalyst, philosopher and theoretical biologist (1912).
- 24th – Lionel Messi, Argentine footballer (1987).
- 28th:
  - Henry VIII, King of England known for his six marriages and commencement of the English Reformation (1491).
  - Jean-Jacques Rousseau, Genevan philosopher influential in the Age of Enlightenment (1712).
- 29th – Yusuf I of Granada, seventh Nasrid ruler of the Emirate of Granada who presided over its golden age (1318).

=== Deaths ===
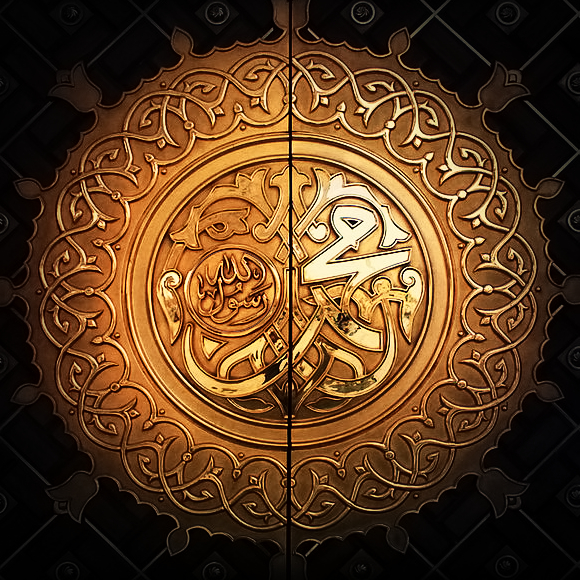
Muhammad died on 8 June 632

Noteworthy people who died in June include:

- 1st – Emperor Gaozu of Han, founder and first emperor of the Han dynasty of China (195 BC).
- 3rd – William Harvey, English physician, first known to describe the circulatory system of the human body (1657).
- 4th:
  - Antonio José de Sucre, Venezuelan general and politician, influential in the Spanish American wars of independence (1830).
  - Wilhelm II, final German Emperor and King of Prussia (1941).
- 8th:
  - Andrew Jackson, American lawyer and general who served as the seventh president of the United States (1845).
  - Muhammad, Arab religious, social and political leader, founder of Islam (632).
- 9th:
  - Nero, Roman emperor, last of the Julio-Claudian dynasty (AD 68).
  - Charles Dickens, English novelist, journalist, short story writer and social critic (1870).
- 10th:
  - Frederick Barbarossa, Holy Roman Emperor regarded as among the empire's greatest of the medieval era (1190).
  - Christina Grimmie, American singer-songwriter (Find Me) and talent show participant (The Voice) (2016).
  - Gordie Howe, Canadian ice hockey player (2016).
- 10th or 11th – Alexander the Great, King of Macedon, regarded as one of the greatest and most successful military commanders (323 BC).

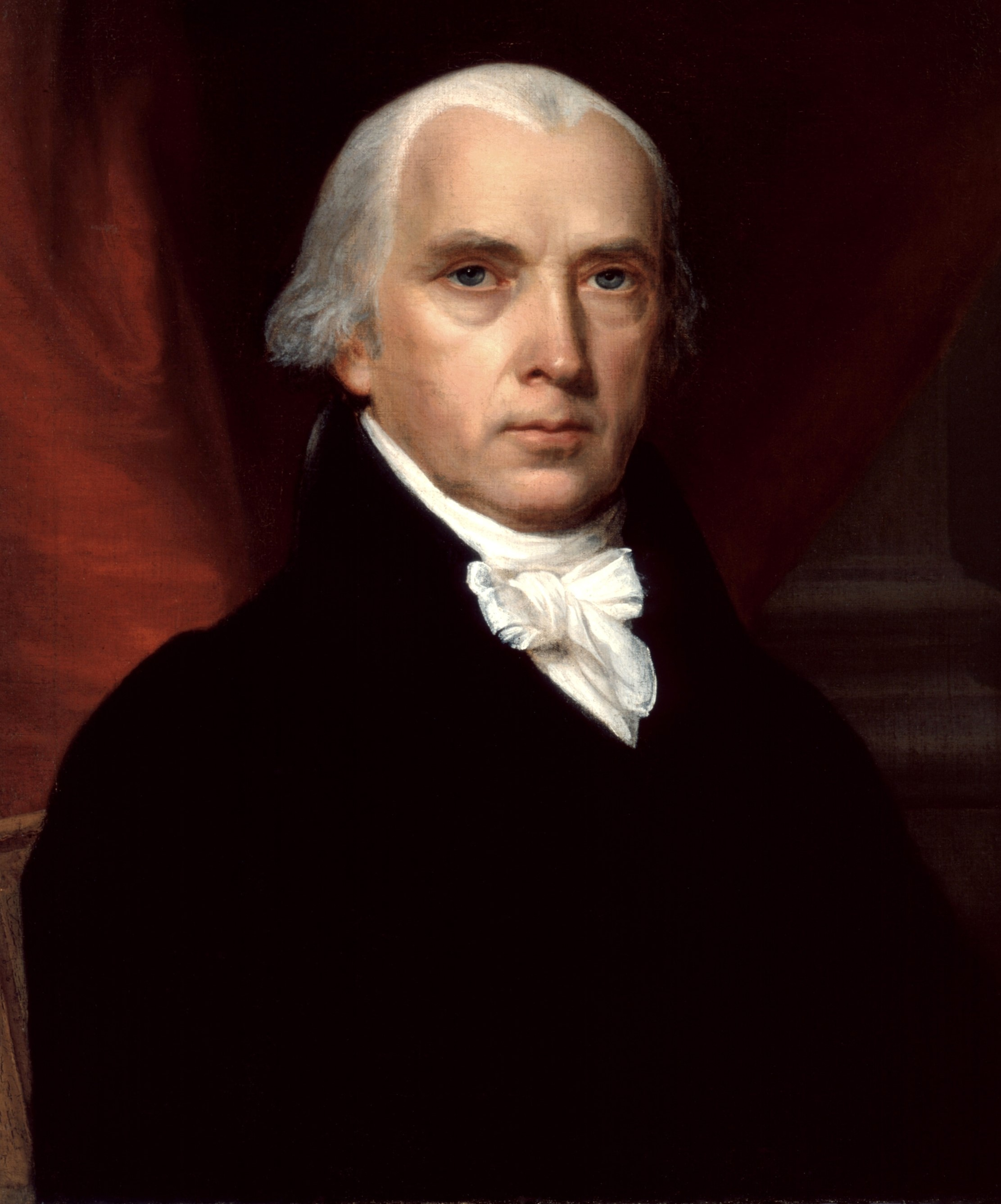
James Madison died on 28 June 1836

- 14th – Max Weber, German sociologist and historian, central figure in the development of sociology and the social sciences (1920).
- 17th – Uthman, third caliph of the Rashidun Caliphate who ordered the official compilation of the standardised version of the Quran (656).
- 18th – Leo III the Isaurian, first Byzantine emperor of the Isaurian dynasty (741).
- 21st:
  - Edward III, King of England who restored royal authority (1377).
  - Niccolò Machiavelli, Florentine diplomat, author, philosopher and historian regarded as the father of modern political philosophy and political science (1527).
- 24th – Hongwu Emperor, founding emperor of the Ming dynasty of China (1398).
- 25th – Michael Jackson, American singer, songwriter and dancer, among the best-selling music artists of all time (2009).
- 27th – Joseph Smith, American religious leader, founder of Mormonism and the Latter Day Saint movement (1844).
- 28th – James Madison, American Founding Father and fourth president of the United States (1836).
