= VRF =

VRF may refer to:

- Variable refrigerant flow, for heating and cooling
- Verifiable random function, in cryptography
- Virtual routing and forwarding
- Vitiligo Research Foundation
- Visiting research fellow (see Visiting scholar)
