= Month of the Sacred Heart =

Catholic devotion for the month of June

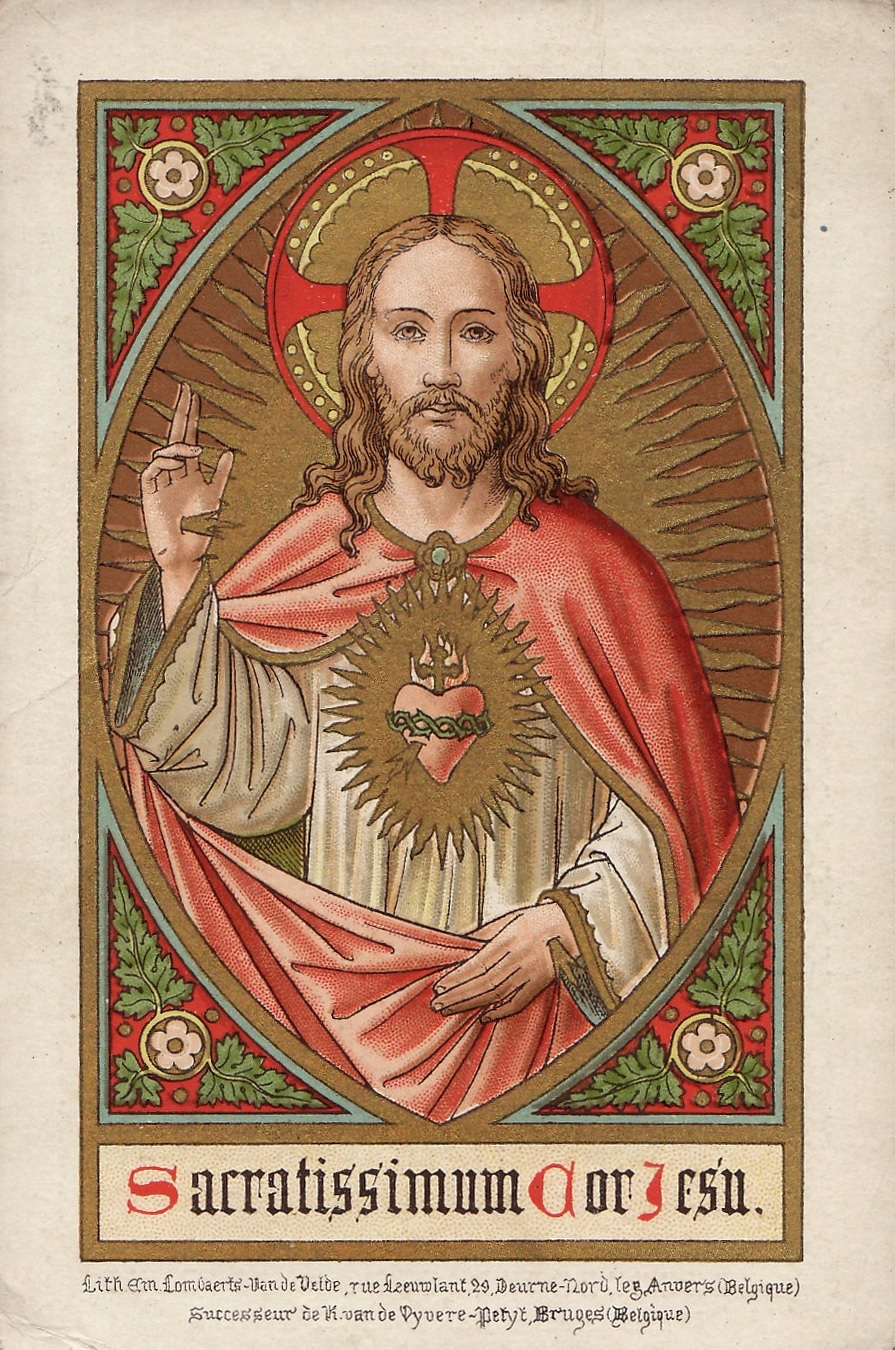
- Type: Religious
- Observances: Celebration of the Sacred Heart, divine love, and Catholic culture
- Date: June
- Frequency: Annual
- First time: 1790; 235 years ago
- Related to: Month of Mary

The Month of the Sacred Heart refers to the Catholic devotion of dedicating the month of June to the devotion of the Sacred Heart of Jesus. Various devotions are usually celebrated during that month.

== History ==
=== June 1674 apparition ===
Since the development of the devotion to the Sacred Heart in France in the 17th century, the month of June has been connected to the Sacred Heart.

Most probably in June or July 1674, Margaret Mary Alacoque claimed that Jesus requested to be honoured under the figure of his heart, also saying that, when he appeared radiant with love, he asked for a devotion of expiatory love: frequent reception of Communion, especially on the First Fridays of the month, and the observance of the Holy hour.

Again, during the octave of Corpus Christi in 1675, probably on June 16, the vision known as the "great apparition" reportedly took place and asked Margaret Mary for a feast of reparation of the Friday after the octave of Corpus Christi, bidding her consult her confessor Claude de la Colombière, then superior of the small Jesuit house at Paray-le-Monial.

=== Forty days in June during the French Revolution ===
The first "month" of the Sacred Heart was celebrated at the time of the French Revolution. In fact, French Jesuit Alexandre Lanfant, who would die as a martyr in the Massacres of September 1792, encouraged the distribution of a pamphlet calling for forty days of prayer and penance which ended with a solemn prayer of consecration to the Sacred Heart in June 1790.

=== A devotion expanded in the 19th century ===
Various religious orders and especially generations of Jesuits such as Jean-Joseph Huguet, François-Xavier Gautrelet, Henry Ramière, Louis-Gaston de Ségur, composed mass-printed devotionals with prayers to the Sacred Heart for every day of June.

The June devotions to the Sacred Heart expanded through the 19th century, and it culminated in popular devotion on 16 June 1875, when the Archbishop of Paris, Cardinal Guibert laid the first stone of the basilica of the Sacred Heart of Montmartre, honouring after two hundred years the fourth request reported by Margaret Mary Alacoque from June 16, 1675. As three fifths of the annual income of the temporary chapel were coming during June, it has been suggested that the choice of June may have also been linked to "larger fine-weather plans".

Based on the messages Mary of the Divine Heart (1863–1899), a religious sister from the Congregation of Our Lady of Charity of the Good Shepherd, said she received in her revelations of Christ, on 10 June 1898 her confessor at the Good Shepherd monastery wrote to Pope Leo XIII. She stated she had received a message from Christ, requesting the pope to consecrate the entire world to the Sacred Heart. The pope initially attached no credence to it and took no action. However, on 6 January 1899 she sent another letter asking that in addition to the consecration, the first Fridays of the month be observed in honour of the Sacred Heart.

Mary of the Divine Heart died in her monastery in Portugal when the church was singing the first vespers of the Sacred Heart of Jesus on 8 June 1899. The following day, Pope Leo XIII consecrated the entire world to the Sacred Heart of Jesus as announced in the encyclical letter Annum sacrum.

The encyclical letter also encouraged the entire Roman Catholic episcopate to promote the First Friday Devotions, established June as the Month of the Sacred Heart, and included the Prayer of Consecration to the Sacred Heart.

=== Raising the feast during the Second Vatican Council ===
While Pope Clement XIII had officially instituted the feast of the Sacred Heart for some places on February 6, 1765, the feast was extended to the whole church when Pope Pius IX designated the Friday following the octave of the feast of Corpus Christi as the feast of the Sacred Heart. During the Second Vatican Council to fully dedicate that month to this specific devotion, the feast was raised to the rank of a solemnity. At the same time, theologians like Nicholas Harnan warned that the expansion of the devotion to the Sacred Heart was becoming a "problem devotion." On 5 June 1965, Pope Paul VI called for a renewal of the devotion to the Sacred Heart. In 1995, Saint John Paul II reiterated the importance of this devotion and instituted the World Day of Prayer for the Sanctification of Priests on the feast of the Sacred Heart in June so that "the priesthood might be protected in the hands of Jesus, rather in his heart, so it could be open to everyone."

=== Observance of June as Sacred Heart month in the 21st century ===
Parallel to the May devotions to the Blessed Virgin Mary, and the devotion of the First Friday of the month, the devotion to the Sacred Heart gradually expanded to the whole month of June. June has been dedicated to veneration of the Sacred Heart of Jesus since at least the nineteenth century. Throughout June, many observant Catholics have posted images of the Sacred Heart of Jesus on social media in opposition to pride month, which they consider to be a celebration of sin by corporations, politicians, government agencies and other secular institutions which have upheld and trumpeted progressive shibboleths. When the United States Catholic Bishops' Conference posted a reminder that June was dedicated to the Sacred Heart, at least one conservative outlet touted it as an attempt to "reclaim" the month of June.

This coincided with the decision by a major league baseball team to honor a satirical drag charity group, the Sisters of Perpetual Indulgence. Pitcher Clayton Kershaw, among others, has expressed his dislike for the Sisters' brand of satire, stating "I don’t agree with making fun of other people’s religions". The United States Conference of Catholic Bishops also issued the following statement:

Catholic Christians traditionally recognize June as the month of the Sacred Heart of Jesus. During this time, we call to mind Christ’s love for us, which is visible in a special way in the image of His pierced heart, and we pray that our own hearts might be conformed to His, calling us to love and respect all His people.

This year, on June 16—the day of the Solemnity of the Sacred Heart of Jesus—a professional baseball team has shockingly chosen to honor a group whose lewdness and vulgarity in mocking our Lord, His Mother, and consecrated women cannot be overstated. This is not just offensive and painful to Christians everywhere; it is blasphemy.

It has been heartening to see so many faithful Catholics and others of good will stand up to say that what this group does is wrong, and it is wrong to honor them. We call on Catholics to pray the Litany of the Sacred Heart of Jesus on June 16, offering this prayer as an act of reparation for the blasphemies against our Lord we see in our culture today.

== Devotions ==
=== Feast of the Sacred Heart ===
The Feast of the Sacred Heart is a feast day in the liturgical calendar of the Roman Rite of the Catholic Church. According to the General Roman Calendar since 1969, it is formally known as the Solemnity of the Most Sacred Heart of Jesus (Latin: Sollemnitas Sacratissimi Cordis Iesu) and falls on the Friday that follows the second Sunday after Pentecost, which is also the Friday after the former octave of Corpus Christi. For that reason, it almost necessarily occurs during the month of June, from which the feast day expanded into a festive month.

=== Prayer of Consecration to the Sacred Heart of Jesus ===
June is traditionally a month during which communities and individuals are consecrated or renew their consecration to the Sacred Heart of Jesus.

=== Litanies of the Sacred Heart of Jesus ===
During the month of June, litanies of the Sacred Heart are often recited and have been encouraged. Thus, saint John Paul II exhorted the faithful in his general audience in these words:

It is well-known that the month of June is dedicated particularly to the Divine Heart, to the Sacred Heart of Jesus. We express to it our love and our adoration by means of the litany which in the single invocations speaks with particular depth of its theological contents.

— Saint John Paul II, General Audience on Saint Peter's Square, Wednesday, 20 June 1979
