= Jogging =

Slow running performed as a form of exercise

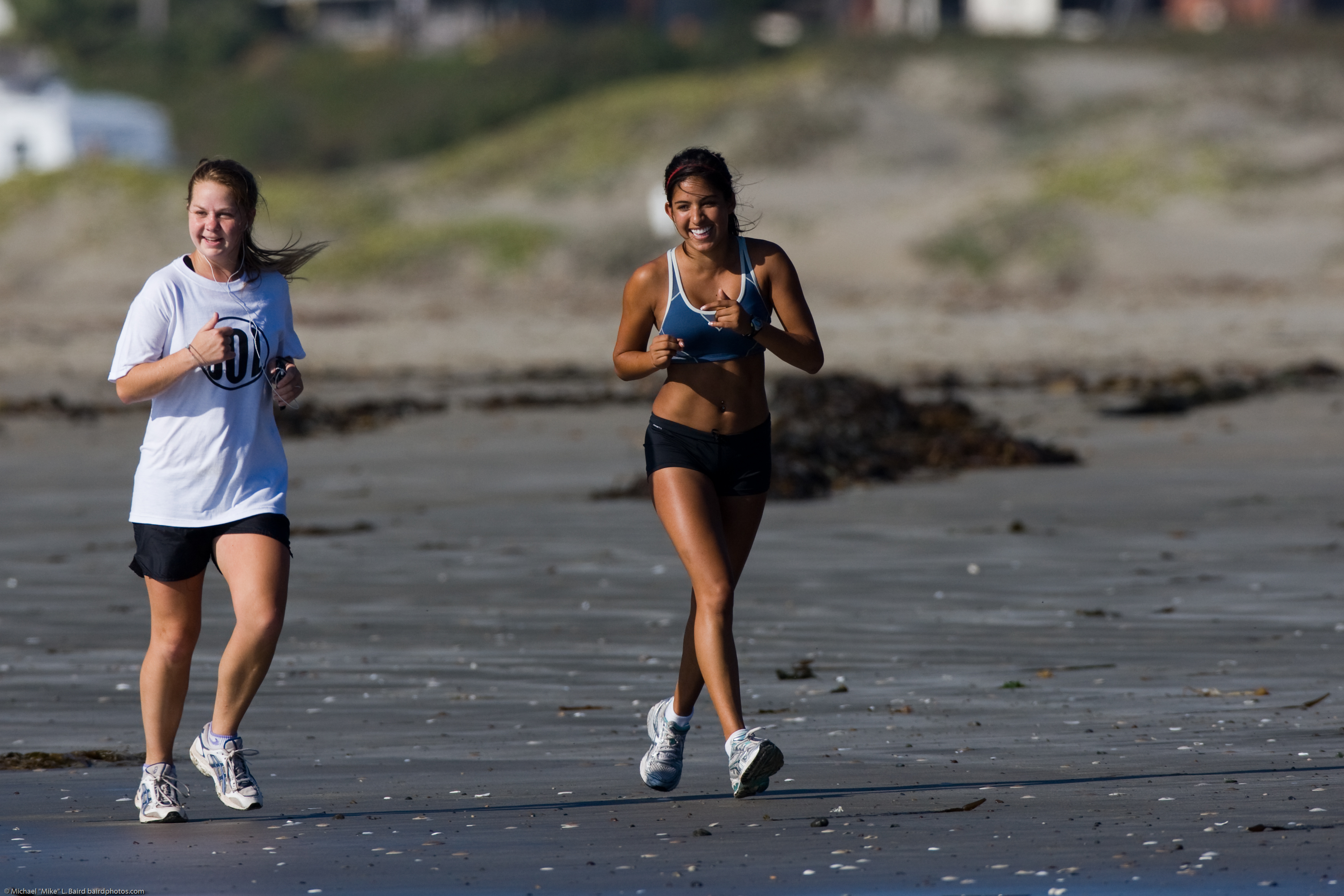
Women jogging along Morro Strand State Beach, California, U.S.

Jogging is a form of trotting or running at a slow or leisurely pace. The main intention is to increase physical fitness with less stress on the body than from faster running but more than walking, or to maintain a steady speed for longer periods of time. Performed over long distances, it is a form of aerobic endurance training.

== Definition ==
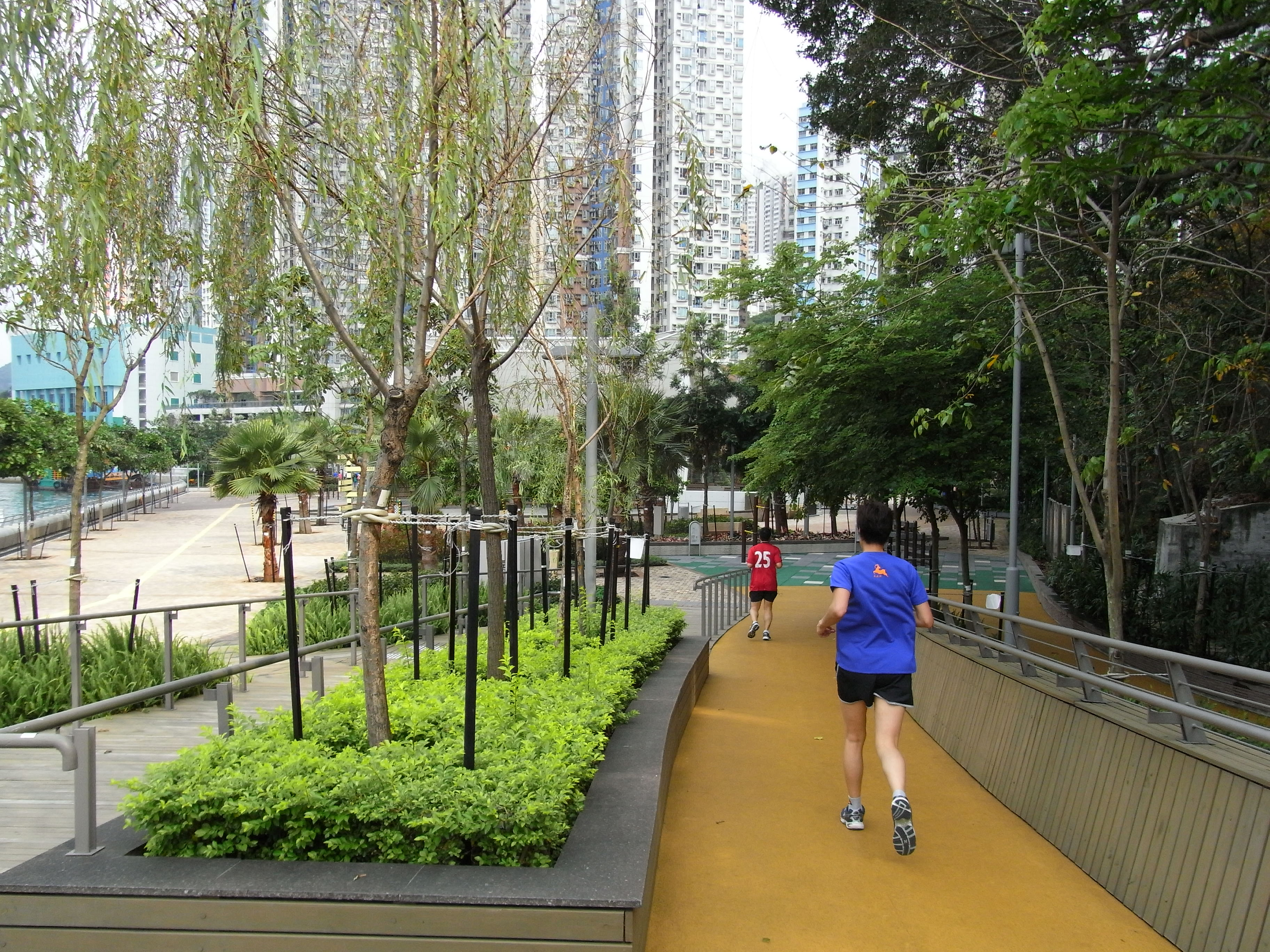
Jogging track in Hong Kong

Jogging is running at a gentle pace; its definition, as compared with running, is not standard. In general, jogging speed is between 4 and 6 miles per hour (6.4 and 9.7 km/h).

== History ==
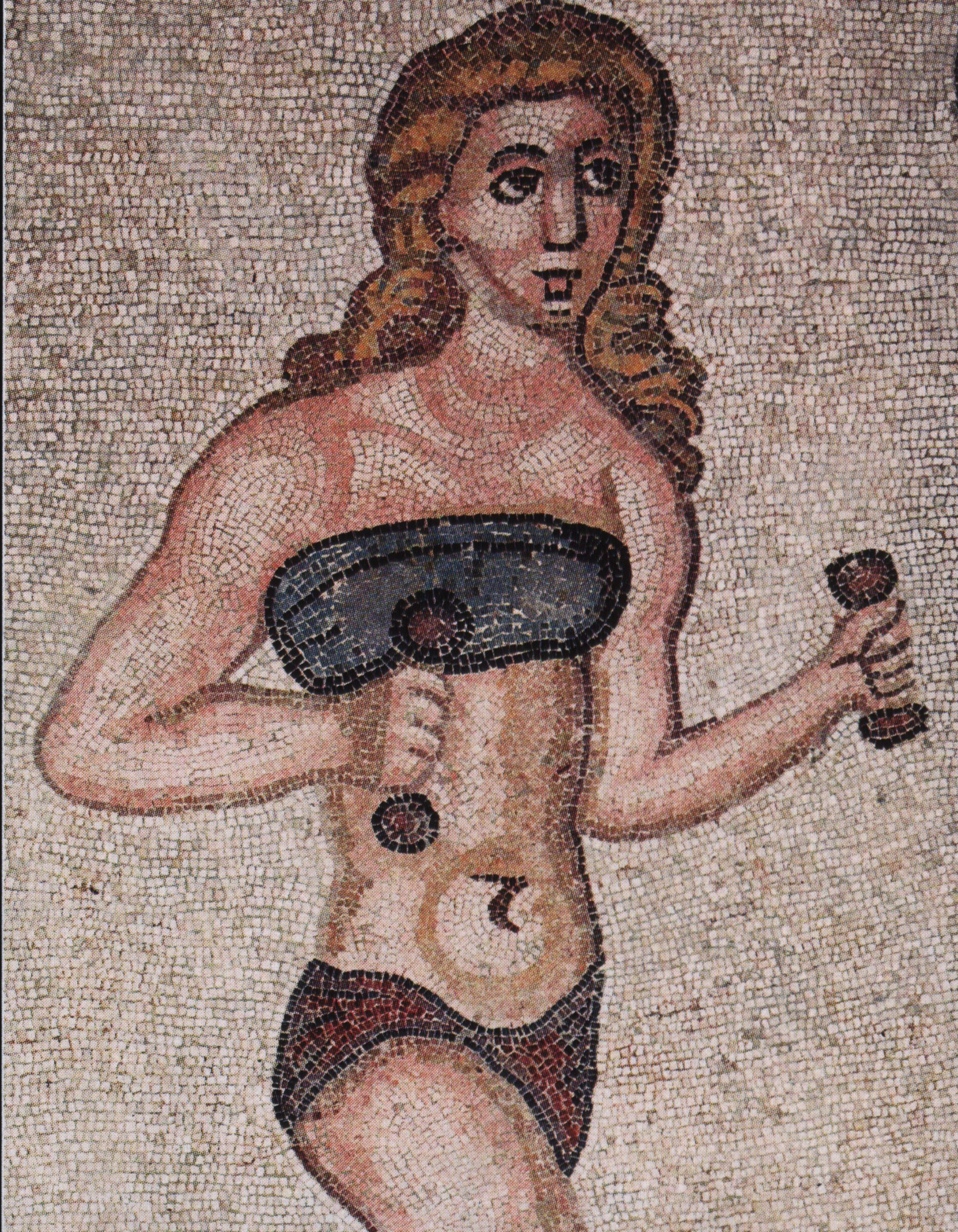
A detail of an ancient mosaic depicting a young woman jogging with dumbbells, fourth century AD

The word jog originated in England in the mid-16th century. The etymology is unknown, but it may be related to shog or have been a new invention. In 1593, William Shakespeare wrote in Taming of the Shrew, "you may be jogging whiles your boots are green". At that point, it usually meant to leave.

The term jog was often used in English and North American literature to describe short quick movements, either intentional or unintentional. It is also used to describe a quick, sharp shake or jar. Richard Jefferies, an English naturalist, wrote of "joggers", describing them as quickly moving people who brushed others aside as they passed. This usage became common throughout the British Empire.

In the United States, jogging was called "roadwork" when athletes in training, such as boxers, customarily ran several miles each day as part of their conditioning. In New Zealand during the 1960s or 1970s, the word "roadwork" was mostly supplanted by the word "jogging", promoted by coach Arthur Lydiard, who is credited with popularizing jogging. The idea of jogging as an organised activity was mooted in a sports page article in The New Zealand Herald in February 1962, which told of a group of former athletes and fitness enthusiasts who would meet once a week to run for "fitness and sociability". Since they would be jogging, the newspaper suggested that the club "may be called the Auckland Joggers' Club"—which is thought to be the first use of the noun "jogger". University of Oregon track coach Bill Bowerman, after jogging with Lydiard in New Zealand in 1962, started a joggers' club in Eugene in early 1963. He published the book Jogging in 1966, popularizing jogging in the United States. Jogging would explode in popularity in a variety of countries in the 1970s.

== Exercise ==
Jogging may also be used as a warm up or cool down for runners, preceding or following a workout or race. It is often used by serious runners as a means of active recovery during interval training. For example, a runner who completes a fast 400 meter repetition at a sub-5-minute mile pace (3 minute km) may drop to an 8-minute mile jogging pace (5 minute km) for a recovery lap.

Jogging is an effective way to boost endurance and improve cardiovascular health while placing less stress on the joints and circulatory system compared to more intense exercises.

== Benefits ==
According to a study by Stanford University School of Medicine, jogging is effective in increasing human lifespan, and decreasing the effects of aging, with benefits for the cardiovascular system. Jogging is useful for fighting obesity and staying healthy. However, individuals who are obese should exercise caution when jogging, as the risk of injury increases.

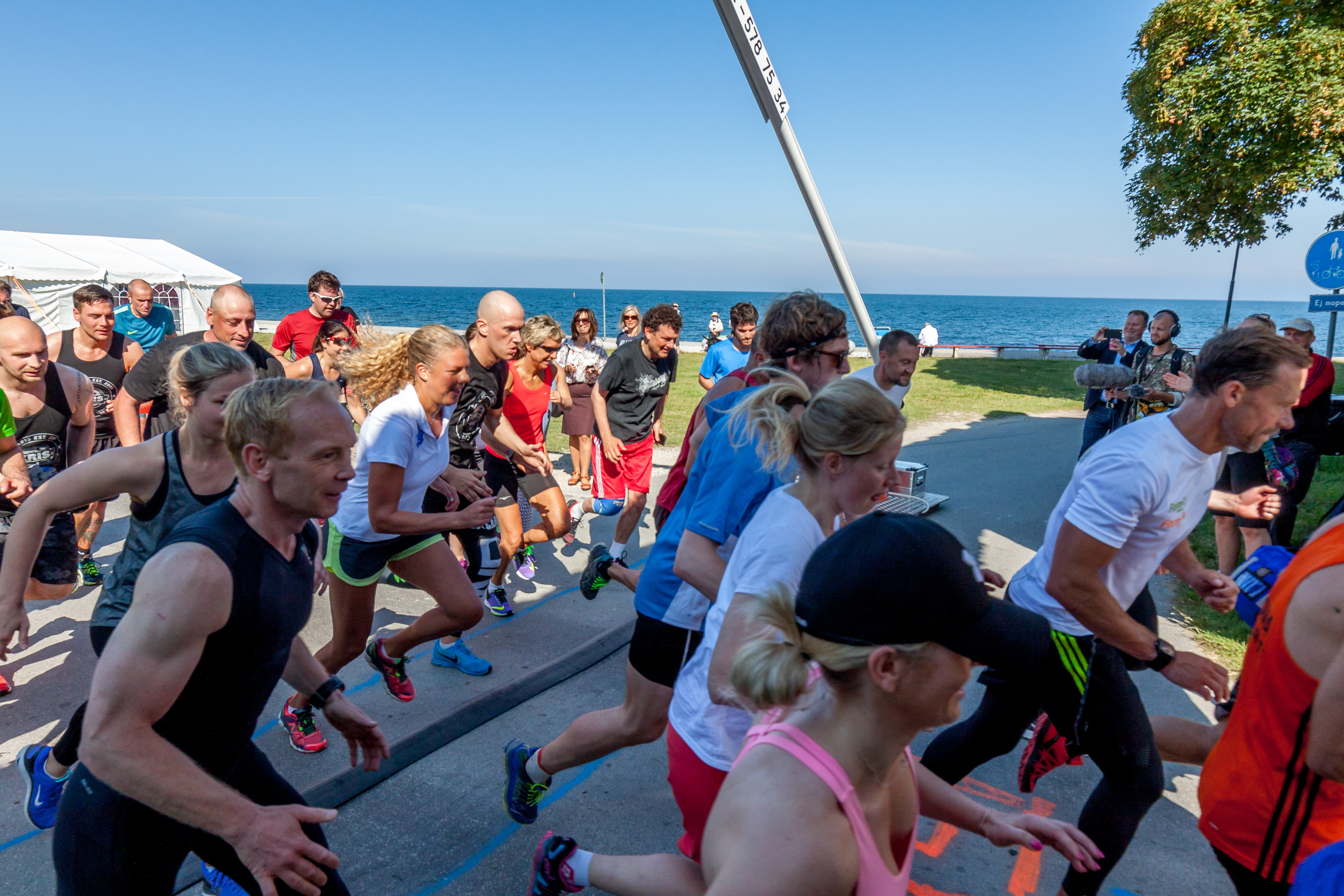
Säpojoggen jogging event in Sweden

The National Cancer Institute has performed studies that suggest jogging and other types of aerobic exercise can reduce the risk of lung, colon, breast and prostate cancers, among others. It is suggested by the American Cancer Society that jogging for at least 30 minutes five days a week can help in cancer prevention.

People jogging in Japan.

While jogging on a treadmill will provide health benefits such as cancer prevention, and aid in weight loss, a study published in BMC Public Health reports that jogging outdoors can have the additional benefits of increased energy and concentration. Jogging outdoors is a better way to improve energy levels and advance mood than using a treadmill.

Jogging also prevents muscle and bone damage that often occurs with age, improves heart performance and blood circulation and assists in preserving a balanced weight gain.

A Danish study released in 2015 reported that "light" and "moderate" jogging were associated with reduced mortality compared to both non-jogging and "strenuous" jogging. The optimal amount per week was 1 to 2.4 hours, the optimal frequency was less than or equal to 3 times per week and the optimal speed was "slow" or "average". A recent meta-analysis on running/jogging and mortality, including more than 230,000 participants found that runners were at 27% lower risk of death than non-runners, during 5.5-35 year follow-ups.

== See also ==
- 5K run
- Activewear
- Jim Fixx
- Global Running Day
- Marathon
- Outline of running
- Physical exercise
- jog.fm
