= Grand Hotel (Mackinac Island) =

Historic seasonal hotel in Michigan, United States

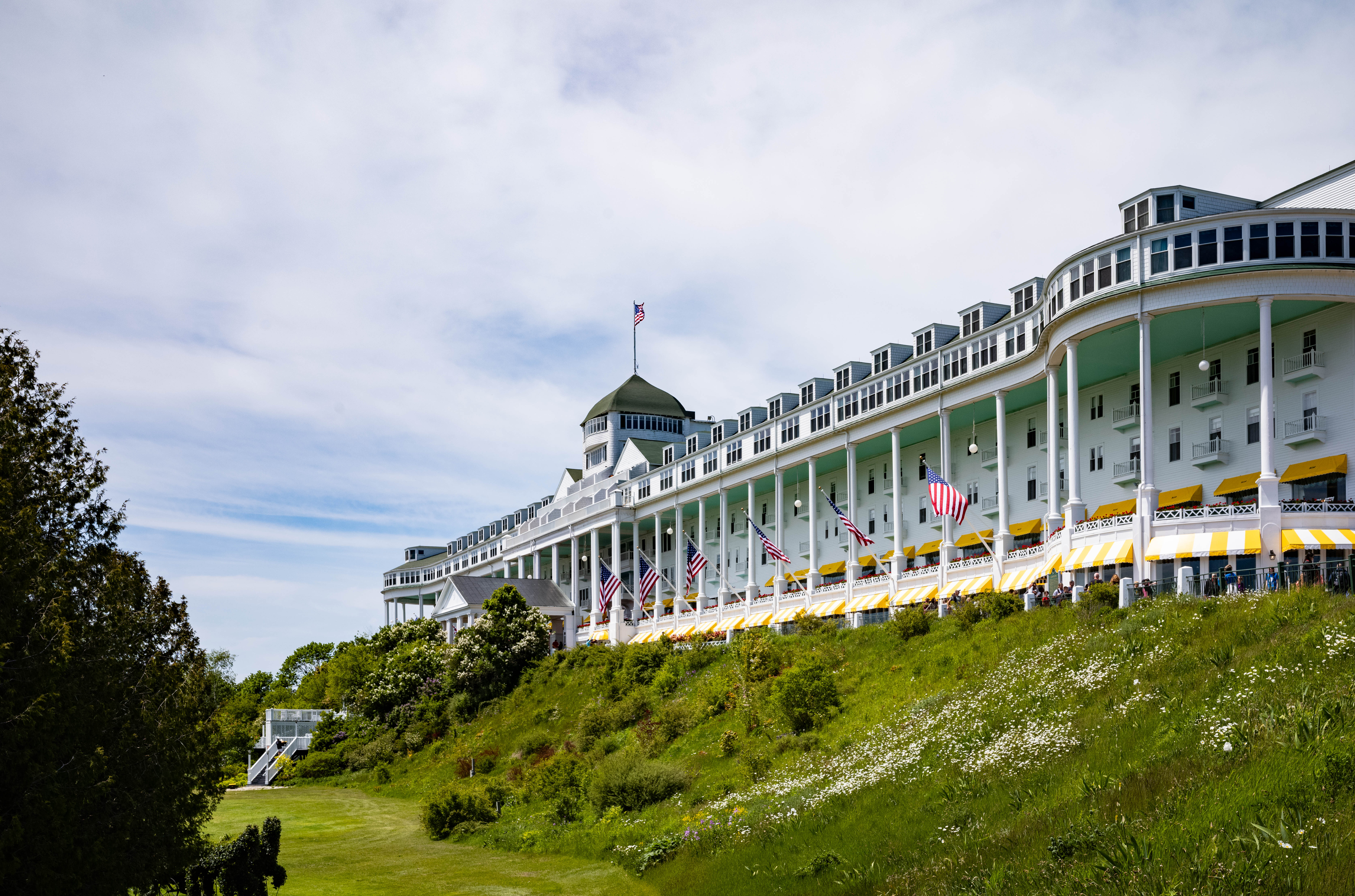
- The Grand Hotel in 2024
- Interactive map

General information
- Architectural style: Queen Anne
- Location: 286 Grand Avenue, Mackinac Island, Michigan, U.S.
- Coordinates: 45°51′4″N 84°37′33″W
- Year built: 1887

Design and construction
- Architect: Mason & Rice
- Other designers: Alphonse Howe and Charles Caskey, builders; assisted by John O. Plank

Website
- grandhotel.com

U.S. National Historic Landmark
- Designated: June 29, 1989

U.S. National Register of Historic Places
- Designated: May 5, 1972
- Reference no.: 72000637

Michigan State Historic Site
- Designated: July 12, 1957

Grand Hotel is a historic hotel and coastal resort on Mackinac Island, Michigan, a small island located at the eastern end of the Straits of Mackinac within Lake Huron between the state's Upper and Lower peninsulas. Constructed in the late 19th century, the facility advertises itself as having the world's largest porch. Grand Hotel is known for a number of notable visitors, including five U.S. presidents, inventor Thomas Edison, and author Mark Twain.

Grand Hotel is a member of Historic Hotels of America, a program of the National Trust for Historic Preservation.

== History ==
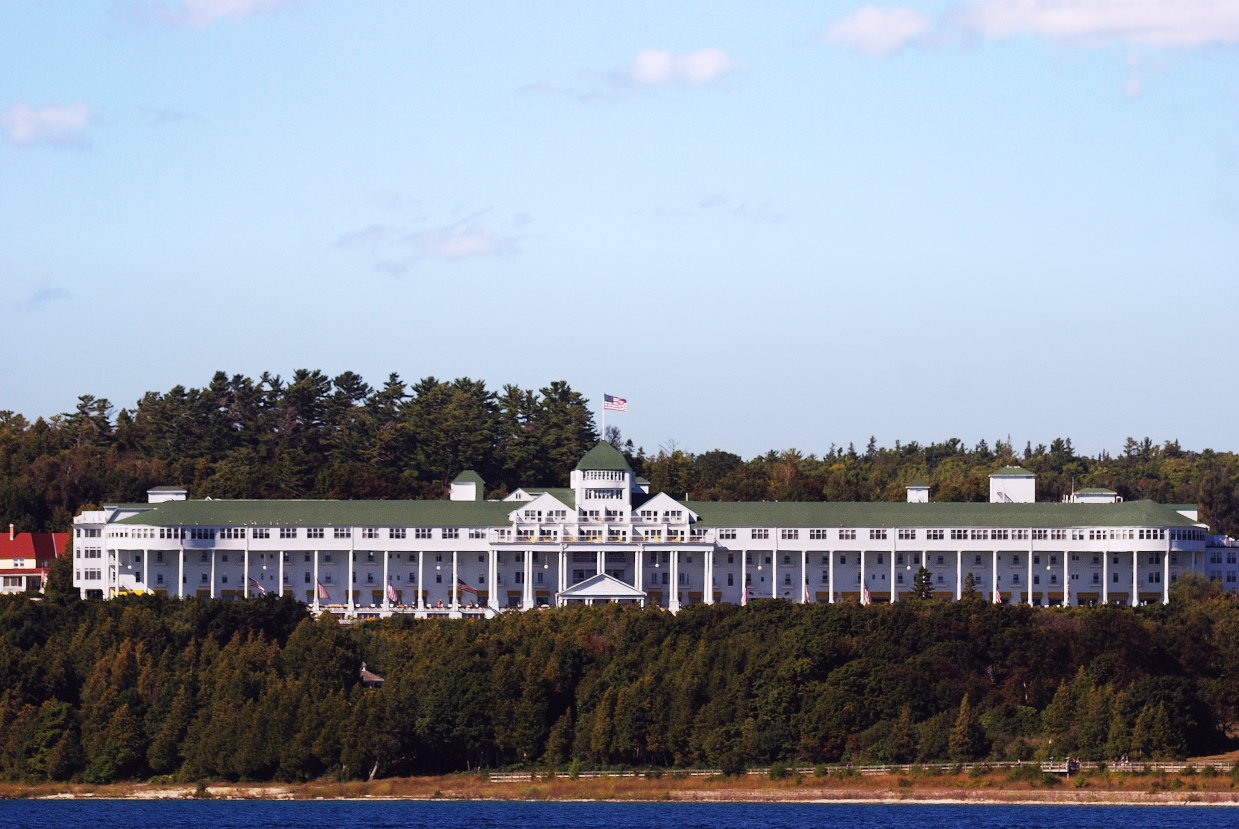
Grand Hotel as seen from Lake Huron in 2008.

Mackinac Island National Park became the second National Park in the United States in 1875 (before becoming a Michigan State park in 1895). This led to a large increase in visitors to the island. In 1886, the Michigan Central Railroad, Grand Rapids and Indiana Railroad, and Detroit and Cleveland Steamship Navigation Company formed the Mackinac Island Hotel Company. The group purchased the land on which the hotel was built and construction began, based upon the design by Detroit architects Mason and Rice. When it opened the following year, the hotel was advertised to Chicago, Erie, Montreal and Detroit residents as a summer retreat for vacationers who arrived by lake steamer and by rail from across the continent. The hotel opened on July 10, 1887, after taking a mere 93 days to complete. At its opening, nightly rates at the hotel ranged from US$3 to $5 a night (equivalent to $107.5–179.17 in 2025).

In 1957, Grand Hotel was designated a State Historic Building. In 1972, the hotel was named to the National Register of Historic Places, and on June 29, 1989, the hotel was made a National Historic Landmark.

In September 2019, Dan Musser III announced that his family, which owned the hotel "for nearly nine decades", was selling it to KSL Capital Partners.

== Facilities ==
Carleton Varney, a protégé of Dorothy Draper, decorated Grand Hotel in late 19th-century decor, including Pelargonium geraniums. Varney purposely designed the hotel so that all the rooms are different from each other in at least one aspect. There are four types of rooms: Category I, Category II, Category III, and Named Rooms. There are six two-bedroom suites consisting of two bedrooms connected by a parlor, of which two, the Grand Suite and the Carleton Varney Suite, overlook the Mackinac Bridge and the Straits of Mackinac. The presidential suite is located in the center of the hotel with a balcony over the porch. A detached structure added in early 2000 was named the Masco Cottage.

Additionally, seven suites are named for and designed by seven former First Ladies of the United States. These are the Jacqueline Kennedy Suite (with carpet that includes the gold presidential eagle on a navy blue background and walls painted gold), Lady Bird Johnson Suite (yellow damask-covered walls with blue and gold wildflowers), Betty Ford Suite (green with cream and a dash of red), Rosalynn Carter Suite (with a sample of china designed for the Carter White House and wall coverings in Georgia peach), Nancy Reagan Suite (with signature red walls and Mrs. Reagan's personal touches), Barbara Bush Suite (designed with pale blue and pearl and with both Maine and Texas influences), and the Laura Bush Suite (decorated with bright cream and floral patterns inspired by the Texas prairie).

Grand Hotel's front porch is the longest in the world at some 660 feet (200 m) in length, overlooking a vast Tea Garden and the resort-scale Esther Williams swimming pool. These areas are often used by guests on a casual family vacation, for larger conventions, or concerts during the hotel's annual Labor Day Jazz Festival. The hotel has drawn some criticism for its policy of charging a $12 fee for non-guests to enter the building and enjoy the view from the famous porch.

Before 2007, air conditioning was only available in public rooms, such as the lobby, parlor and Salle a Manger (main dining room). Due to the building's design it was difficult to add air conditioning to the guest rooms. That year, the entire hotel became air conditioned after 170 guest rooms were installed with heat exchangers which cool the air through contact with the bathroom cold water system.

Mackinac Island does not permit motor vehicles (except for emergency vehicles and, in winter, snowmobiles), and transport to and from the dock to the hotel is via horse-drawn carriage. The only other motor vehicles allowed in recent history were cars brought over for the filming of Somewhere in Time. During the winter months, when ice prevents ferry transport from the mainland, the hotel is closed. The island also has a small airport (no fuel or services) for private aircraft. Horse-drawn taxis take guests from the airport to the hotel or any other island destination.

== Notable events ==
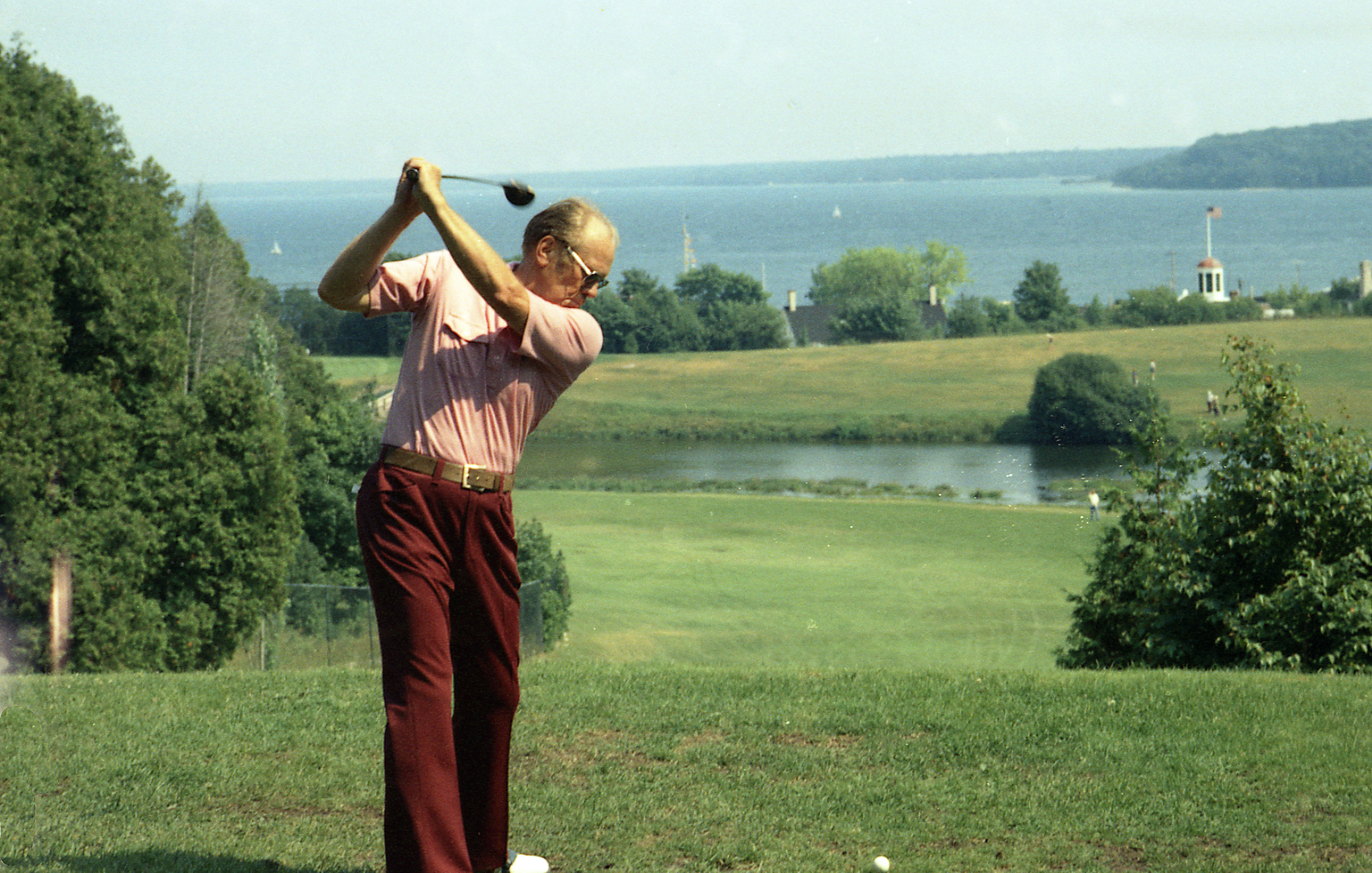
President Gerald Ford golfing on the "Grand" (front) nine of Grand Hotel's golf course, The Jewel, on July 13, 1975

U.S. Presidents Harry Truman, John F. Kennedy, Gerald Ford, George H. W. Bush, and Bill Clinton have visited the hotel. The hotel also hosted the first public demonstration of Thomas Edison's phonograph on the porch, as well as regular demonstrations of Edison's other new inventions. Mark Twain also made this a regular location on his speaking tours in the Midwest.

== Acclaim ==
Conde Nast Traveler "Gold Lists" the hotel as one of the "Best Places to Stay in the Whole World" and Travel + Leisure magazine lists it as among the "Top 100 Hotels in the World." The Wine Spectator noted the Grand Hotel with an "Award of Excellence" and it was included in Gourmet magazine's "Top 25 Hotels in the World" list. The American Automobile Association (AAA) rates the facilities as a four-diamond resort and in 2009 named the Grand Hotel one of the top 10 U.S. historic hotels.

== In popular culture ==
Grand Hotel served as a backdrop and one of the settings for the 1980 film Somewhere in Time starring Christopher Reeve and Jane Seymour. Every October the hotel hosts an annual convention for fans of the classic.

The hotel also served as the setting for the 1947 musical comedy This Time for Keeps starring entertainer Jimmy Durante and swimmer Esther Williams (after whom the hotel's swimming pool is named).

The hotel was the origin of the first World Sauntering Day in the 1970s.

== See also ==
- List of National Historic Landmarks in Michigan
- The Dearborn Inn
