= World Sauntering Day =

Annual international event on June 19

World Sauntering Day, sometimes also known as International Sauntering Day is celebrated on June 19 every year. The purpose is to remind people to slow down and enjoy life as opposed to rushing through it.

== History ==
The holiday was created in 1979 by W.T. Rabe in response to the growing popularity of jogging. It is believed to have begun at the Grand Hotel on Mackinac Island in Michigan, USA where Rabe worked. The idea behind the day was to encourage people to slow down and appreciate the world around them.
