= Fine Paints of Europe =

Company in the United States

- Founded: 1987
- Headquarters: Vermont, United States
- Products: Paint
- Website: www.finepaintsofeurope.com

Fine Paints of Europe, located in Woodstock, Vermont, U.S., is the sole North American importer of paints and varnishes manufactured in the Netherlands by Wijzonol Bouwverven B.V.

== History ==
When founded in 1987, most of the company's products were destined for application in the restoration of historic properties, primarily on the East Coast of the United States. Today, the company's products are sold for both commercial and residential application. Architectural Digest and Traditional Home magazines frequently feature Fine Paints of Europe products and colors. The company also exclusively sold oil based paint until the late 1990s, when they introduced the Eurolux water-based acrylic latex line and the Eco hybrid enamel line. Founder John Lahey's inspiration for starting Fine Paints of Europe can be traced back his travels to Europe (and the Netherlands in particular) in the mid 1980s where he found paint coatings of a standard and quality unavailable in North America. Their products can be purchased a participating paint dealers or directly from the company.

In 2013 John F. Lahey followed his father, the founder, as president of the company.

== Development ==
In recent years the company has developed and retailed premium paint palettes by the American designers Susan Sargent and Martha Stewart, and by Pantone. As sole licensee of Pantone Paints, the company offers a range of International color palettes including the Natural Color System, a 1,750 color palette developed by the Scandinavian Color Institute, and RAL, a color space system developed in 1927 by the Reichsausschuß für Lieferbedingungen und Gütesicherung (State Commission for Delivery Terms and Quality Assurance). The RAL color system has over 1,900 colors.

Since 2008 Fine Paints of Europe has conducted an Annual Painters Certification held near their Corporates offices in Woodstock, Vermont. The company maintains a list of certified painters on their website Certified Painters Fine Paints of Europe.
