= World Vitiligo Day =

Loss of color in the skin

- Logo of World Vitiligo Day
- Observed by: Worldwide
- Begins: 25 June 2011 (15 years ago)
- Date: 25 June
- Next time: 25 June 2027
- Frequency: annual

World Vitiligo Day, observed annually on June 25, is a global campaign dedicated to raising awareness of vitiligo and supporting those affected by the condition. Vitiligo affects approximately 1 percent of the global population and is characterized by the loss of skin pigmentation, resulting in distinctive white patches that may appear asymmetrically on the body. Misconceptions about the condition remain widespread, and its social and psychological impact on individuals can be significant.

The campaign was initially sparked by Ogo Maduewesi, founder and Executive Director of the Vitiligo Support and Awareness Foundation (VITSAF), who organized "Vitiligo Purple Fun Day" in Lagos, Nigeria, in 2011. The event honored the memory of Michael Jackson — who publicly lived with vitiligo until his death on June 25, 2009 — and brought together dermatologists, artists, motivational speakers, and patients to promote understanding of the condition. While not originally named as such, the event was later recognized as a precursor to World Vitiligo Day.

The initiative was further developed and formalized by the Vitiligo Research Foundation (VRF), led by Yan Valle. In 2012, the VRF partnered with VITSAF and other organizations to coordinate global events and advocacy efforts, including a petition to the United Nations seeking official recognition of the day.

== History of World Vitiligo Day ==
=== Early proposals and first national observances (2005–2011) ===
The origins of the World Vitiligo Day proposal can be traced to 2005, when the Indian Association of Dermatologists, Venereologists and Leprologists (IADVL) identified vitiligo social awareness as one of its priorities. During a meeting in Hydebarat, with Dr. Venkatram Mysore proposed establishing a dedicated national awareness day for vitiligo. On June 30, 2006, The proposal was accepted by the IADVL National Executive Council at Rajkot, Gujarat. The National General Secretary of IADVL, Kaushik Lahiri, designated May 19 as the annual observance date in memory of Ajit Kumar Dutta, a Kolkata dermatologist who pioneered improvements in the care of people with vitiligo.

The initiative expanded across India in the following years, particularly through the efforts of Professor Savita Malhorta of PGIMER, Chandigarh. This observance continued annually until 2015. Around the same time, Professor Davinder Parsad, a prominent researcher at PGIMER and a leading authority on vitiligo, became a key figure in mobilizing institutional support. In 2011, he played a central role in bringing together India's three major dermatological societies—the Indian Association of Dermatologists, Venereologists and Leprologists (IADVL), the Indian Society of Pediatric Dermatology (ISPD), and the Pigmentary Disorders Society (PDS)—to endorse a unified global awareness day.

Separately, in the United States, Steve Hargadon—founder of the Vitiligo Friends online network—voiced the idea of an international vitiligo day. While he did not actively organize campaigns, his suggestion helped seed the concept. Lee Thomas—an entertainment reporter from Fox2TV back then and also a founder of VStrong support group in Detroit—was campaigning for vitiligo awareness since around 2007. In 2010, Barbara Summers, a patient advocate in Delaware, successfully petitioned Governor Jack Markell to proclaim July as Vitiligo Awareness Month. However, these early initiatives remained localized and lacked global coordination.

=== Purple Fun Day and first global observance (2011–2012) ===
In Nigeria, the concept of a global awareness day took concrete form in 2011. Ogo Maduewesi, a vitiligo patient and founder of the Vitiligo Support and Awareness Foundation (VITSAF), independently developed and launched a campaign under the name "Purple Fun Day." She selected June 25 as the date to honor the memory of pop star Michael Jackson, who had publicly disclosed his vitiligo diagnosis. The inaugural event took place at the Artrum of Silverbird Galleria in Lagos and included participation from dermatologists, performers, motivational speakers, and community members.

Although Maduewesi's first petition garnered just 1,002 signatures, her advocacy caught the attention of the Vitiligo Research Foundation (VRF). In early 2012, Maduewesi reached out to the VRF after other organizations declined to support her idea. According to VRF CEO Yan Valle, this correspondence marked the beginning of what would become World Vitiligo Day as it is recognized today. The VRF adopted the June 25 date, created the WVD website (25june.org), and formalized a petition with the goal of securing 500,000 signatures to present to the United Nations.

The first internationally coordinated observance of World Vitiligo Day took place on June 23, 2012, in Rome, Italy, with the main event hosted at the University of Guglielmo Marconi by Professors Torello Lotti and Yan Valle. Despite a transportation strike that limited media coverage in Rome, awareness events occurred across Africa, Europe, and North America on June 25, 2012.

=== Expansion, UN Engagement, and organizational roles (2012–present) ===
Following the inaugural event, the VRF assumed a leading role in organizing and promoting World Vitiligo Day globally. The campaign grew rapidly, in part due to the active support of the global vitiligo community and public figures connected to Michael Jackson's legacy. A new petition drive eventually surpassed 500,000 signatures by mid-2015.

Valarie Molyneaux, founder and president of the U.S.-based advocacy group VITFriends, emerged as a key figure in the North American movement. Under her leadership, VITFriends collaborated with other patient organizations, including Vitiligo Bond and the American Vitiligo Research Foundation, to build political and public support. In 2016, VITFriends organized the largest vitiligo rally in U.S. history at Capitol Hill, Washington, D.C., with over 300 attendees and additional public observers present.

As a result of collective advocacy efforts, World Vitiligo Day was formally included in the United Nations' Calendar of Disability Events in December 2016, supported by the VRF's Special Consultative Status with the UN ECOSOC. However, in 2019, the UN revised its criteria for the calendar to include only high-level events organized directly by UN agencies. Since WVD is organized independently by non-governmental actors, it was removed from the calendar.

Despite this, the campaign has continued to expand, with annual headquarters rotating globally—in Detroit (2013), Chandigarh (2014), Shenyang (2015), Prague (2016), São Paulo (2017), Boston (2018), Hanoi (2019), Serbia (2020), Jakarta (2021), Mexico City (2022), Almaty (2023), Cali (2024), and Toronto (2025).

== Legislative and policy advocacy in the United States ==
=== Rediscovery of the National Vitiligo Control Act ===
In 2015, Yan Valle, CEO of VRF, uncovered official congressional records of the long-forgotten National Vitiligo Control Act, a piece of legislation introduced by Congressman Parren J. Mitchell (D-MD) during the 94th and 95th sessions of the U.S. Congress. Mitchell, a civil rights leader and the first African American elected to Congress from Maryland, had vitiligo himself and recognized the condition's medical and social implications—particularly within communities of color.

The first bill, H.R. 5264, was introduced on March 20, 1975. It proposed amending the Public Health Service Act to authorize federal funding for vitiligo research, public education campaigns, and early detection initiatives. A revised version, H.R. 3520 (identical to H.R. 3578), was reintroduced on February 16, 1977. Despite being co-sponsored by 15 members of Congress—including 12 Democrats and three Republicans—the bills failed to advance beyond committee and expired without a hearing.

=== Capitol Hill Rally and State Proclamations ===
The 2016 WVD rally in Washington, D.C., organized by Valarie Molyneaux, president of VITFriends, with support from other U.S.-based advocacy groups, marked a turning point in national awareness. Eighteen state governors issued proclamations recognizing June 25 as World Vitiligo Day or June as a vitiligo awareness month.

=== Legislative Initiatives and Diverging Dates ===
On March 21, 2017, Representative Hank Johnson (D-GA) introduced H.Res. 213, proposing October 17 as National Vitiligo Awareness Day—a date chosen to align with National Bullying Prevention Month. The resolution gained bipartisan support but faced criticism for departing from the internationally recognized date of June 25. The resolution ultimately stalled in committee.

=== Massachusetts Bill H.976 ===
At the state level, Massachusetts Bill H.976 was introduced in 2023 to mandate insurance coverage for vitiligo treatment and related mental health services. The bill was sponsored by Representative Rob Consalvo and co-sponsored by Rep. John Lawn Jr., with strong grassroots advocacy from VITFriends. Although referred to a study committee in 2024, the bill helped increase public awareness and inspired similar efforts in other states.

== Legislative activity in the European Union ==
The World Health Assembly's May 2025 resolution WHA78.15 agenda item 13.4, which frames skin diseases as a global public-health priority, gave new momentum to dermatology advocacy across Europe. The European Academy of Dermatology and Venereology urged institutions to reflect the resolution across various EU parliamentary sessions

Building on that opportunity, the Vitiligo International Patient Organisations Committee (VIPOC) presented a 54-page European Vitiligo White Paper to the European Parliament on 15 January 2025. The document, drafted with clinical advisors and backed by four Members of the European Parliament, details diagnostic delays (median 2.5 years), misdiagnosis rates of roughly 50%, and uneven access to treatment across the bloc. It calls for harmonised care pathways, vitiligo indicators in EU disease-burden studies and dedicated funding under EU4Health.

Since the Brussels launch, VIPOC has run a multilingual briefing tour through EU capitals and maintained follow-up meetings with MEPs and Commission officials. While no vitiligo-specific legislation has yet been tabled, these efforts—alongside broader dermatology campaigns by patient alliances such as GlobalSkin-Europe—lay the groundwork for future EU action on screening, reimbursement and data collection for pigmentary disorders.

== Structure and strategic model ==
World Vitiligo Day operates on a decentralized, network-based model that distinguishes it from traditional, top-down global health campaigns. At its core is the WVD Presidential Committee, a rotating leadership body that provides strategic direction and curates the theme, focus and principal location of each year's campaign.

The host country typically nominates the President for the year, elevating local leadership and adapting to cultural and healthcare priorities. The annual WVD headquarters also organizes a central conference, often attended by up to 300 participants—including dermatologists, researchers, policymakers, and patient advocates. These events combine scientific exchange with patient storytelling and community building.

Outside the central event, WVD is sustained by a distributed network of local organizations, hospitals, and volunteers who organize their own regionally adapted initiatives. Events range from academic symposia to school programs, artistic exhibitions, and social media campaigns. This grassroots model allows for cultural sensitivity, linguistic diversity, and maximum reach—particularly in underserved or stigmatized regions.

The model has been widely recognized for its civic impact. In the United States alone, dozens of mayors and state governors have issued proclamations in support of WVD. Globally, the campaign has been endorsed by national dermatological societies, ministries of health, and patient alliances. Today, WVD spans over 100 countries and engages tens of thousands of participants each year.

== Pharmaceutical Engagement and Industry Impact ==
A major indirect achievement of World Vitiligo Day has been its role in catalyzing pharmaceutical interest in vitiligo. In 2012, vitiligo was largely seen as an orphan condition with little commercial potential. Treatment options were limited, research funding was minimal, and no therapies had been approved specifically for vitiligo.

A milestone came in March 2021, when the U.S. Food and Drug Administration (FDA) held its first-ever Patient-Focused Drug Development (PFDD) Meeting on vitiligo. Many participants had been mobilized through WVD-affiliated networks. In 2022, Incyte's ruxolitinib cream (Opzelura) became the first drug approved for nonsegmental vitiligo in the U.S., followed by EMA approval in the European Union.

As of 2025, over 40 pharmaceutical and biotech companies—including AbbVie, Pfizer, Eli Lilly, and L'Oréal—have entered the vitiligo pipeline. Investigational therapies now in development include JAK inhibitors, immune modulators, phototherapy-enhancing agents, and cell-based treatments. Analysts project the global vitiligo therapeutics market will reach $2.76 billion by 2032.

== Audience reach ==
World Vitiligo Day 2025 was the first time the VRF as a campaign manager published reach data [*]. Toronto TV spots on Global News Morning and CP24 drew about 250 000 local viewers, but most engagement was online: #worldvitiligoday logged 54 million TikTok views, roughly 12 million on Instagram and 3 million via Facebook platform. VRF estimates day-one reach at ~60 million unique users and 120–150 million total impressions—more than ten times the previous record (5.5 million, China 2020).

These figures cover only the Toronto hub and exclude U.S. events (27–29 June), VIPOC's EU tour, print, radio, podcasts, LinkedIn, Telegram, other niche platforms, and Winnie Harlow's parallel media campaign. The decentralised nature of WVD complicates measurement, but available evidence suggests the final footprint will settle near 120–150 million impressions once secondary channels and delayed coverage are added; numbers beyond that range would over-stretch the current data.

=== Influence of Winnie Harlow on vitiligo awareness ===
Canadian fashion model Winnie Harlow—who has vitiligo herself—became the condition's most visible ambassador after her 2014 debut on America's Next Top Model put vitiligo in millions of U.S. living rooms.

For years she kept her distance from patient-advocacy groups, but a 2025 media tour tied to the launch of her skincare line and the unveiling of her wax figure at Madame Tussauds (timed for 25 June, World Vitiligo Day) changed that stance. Her Instagram following of about 10 million and TikTok base (~875 000) amplified WVD messaging: a 26 June reel on self-acceptance topped 60 000 likes. A same-day appearance on NBC's Today show, where she addressed stigma and self-image, was syndicated across multiple U.S. outlets.

Winnie's independent campaign lies outside VRF's official WVD-2025 audit but likely nudged total impressions beyond the 120–150 million corridor indicated above. While formal correlation analyses are pending, advocacy groups have credited her fashion-oriented messaging with normalising vitiligo imagery in mainstream beauty coverage.

== 2026 World Vitiligo Day: From Stigma to Strength ==
The 2026 World Vitiligo Day headquarters is scheduled for 25 June 2026 at the Postgraduate Institute of Medical Education and Research (PGIMER) in Chandigarh, India. Professor Davinder Parsad has been appointed President of the year.

== Past events ==
=== 2025 ===
Vitiligo Patient Journey Map at the 100th CDA Annual Conference

Date: June 18–21, 2025

Location: Halifax Convention Centre, Halifax, NS, Canada

Details: Poster presentation by Dr. Shahnawaz Towheed, showcasing innovation in patient pathways for dermatology.

World Vitiligo Day 2025 Headquarters

Date: June 25, 2025

Location: Lake Lounge at the MaRS Waterfront, Toronto, ON, Canada

Details: Toronto hosted the 15th anniversary of WVD under the banner "Innovation for Every Skin".

=== 2024 ===
4th VIPOC Conference

Date: December 13, 2024

Details: Global conference uniting vitiligo patient organizations.

1st Pediatric Dermatology World Congress

Date: October 24, 2024

Location: Buenos Aires, Argentina

Details: Organized by the Argentine Association of Pediatric Dermatology and Gutierrez Children's Hospital.

Live Broadcast in Kazakhstan

Date: September 27, 2024

Details: Instagram live with Prof. Yan Valle and Dr. Olga Smirnova on vitiligo onset and treatment.

World Vitiligo Day 2024 - Headquarters

Date: June 24, 2024

Location: Cali, Colombia

Details: Conference led under the honorary presidency of Dr. Claudia Arenas and General Secretary Dr. Adriana Cruz

World Vitiligo Day 2024 - France

Date: June 22, 2024

Location: Bordeaux, France

Details: Organized by French Vitiligo Association with St. André Hospital dermatology team.

World Vitiligo Day - USA 2024

Date: June 19–20, 2024

Location: Indianapolis, IN, USA

Details: Featuring Camp Victory and the Vitiligo Physician Education Summit.

Session on Vitiligo at IMCAS

Date: February 1, 2024

Location: Paris, France

Details: Focus session on new vitiligo treatments, in collaboration with Société Marocaine de Dermatologie.

=== 2023 ===
Revolutionizing Vitiligo (ReV) Virtual Conference

Date: December 10, 2023

Details: CME-accredited virtual conference focused on vitiligo care.

Expert Meeting on Vitiligo

Date: August 24–26, 2023

Location: Bruges, Belgium

Details: Meeting on "New Small Molecules for Treatment of Vitiligo" held by World Health Academy of Integrative Dermatology in Bruges on August 24–26, 2023.

Indoor Rally at the MA State House by VITFriends

Date: June 28, 2023

Location: Massachusetts, USA

Details: State Rep Rob Consalvo, Chair Adrian Madaro (a proud vitiligo warrior), and Chair John Lawn have extended an invitation to VITFriends for an unprecedented indoor rally at the MA State House

World Vitiligo Day 2023 - UK

Date: June 25, 2023

Details: Virtual event organized by Vitiligo Society UK with guest speakers.

World Vitiligo Day 2023 - China

Date: June 25, 2023

Location: First Hospital of China Medical University

Details: Presented by the esteemed Department of Dermatology at the First Hospital of China Medical University. S

World Vitiligo Day 2023 - Mexico

Date: June 25, 2023

Locations: Mexico City, Chihuahua, Monterrey, Guadalajara

Details: The Mexican Vitiligo Foundation has planned a series of events on June 25 in four cities across Mexico, including: Mexico City, Chihuahua, Monterrey, and Guadalajara featuring informative sessions for patients.

World Vitiligo Day 2023 - Headquarters

Date: June 25, 2023

Location: Almaty, Kazakhstan

Theme: "Vitiligo: Looking into the Future"

World Vitiligo Day 2023 - Europe

Date: June 23–26, 2023

Details: The Vitiligo International Patient Organizations Committee (VIPOC) cordially invites European vitiligo patient leaders to attend the World Vitiligo Day conference from June 23–26, 2023.

World Vitiligo Day 2023 - USA

Date: June 23–25, 2023

Location: Atlanta, GA, USA

Theme: "Acceptance. Treatment. Love."

XII Iasi Dermatological Spring

Date: April 24, 2023

Location: Iasi, Romania

Details: Dermatology experience exchange event.

GVF Annual Scientific Symposium 2023

Date: March 16, 2023

Location: New Orleans, USA

Details: GVF Annual Scientific Symposium 2023 will be held alongside the congress of the American Academy of Dermatology in New Orleans

For a complete list of past events, please visit: https://vrfoundation.org/events

== World Vitiligo Day host cities, themes and presidents ==
- 2026 — Chandigarh, India
  - Theme: not yet announced
  - President: Dr Davinder Parsad
- 2025 — Toronto, Canada
  - Theme: Innovation for Every Skin, Powered by AI
  - President: Keith Loo
- 2024 — Cali, Colombia
  - Theme: United by the Skin
  - President: Dr Claudia Arenas
- 2023 — Almaty, Kazakhstan
  - Theme: Vitiligo: Looking into the Future
  - President: Dr Aliya Aidarbekovna Kasymkhanova
- 2022 — Mexico City, Mexico
  - Theme: Learning to Live with Vitiligo
  - President: Dr Jorge Ocampo-Candiani
- 2021 — Jakarta, Indonesia
  - Theme: Embracing Life with Vitiligo
  - President: Dr Srie Prihian Gondokaryono
- 2020 — Zagreb, Croatia
  - Theme: SELF: Awareness, Love, Respect, Care
  - President: Dr Ivana Binić
- 2019 — Hanoi, Vietnam
  - Theme: The Quality of Life of Vitiligo Patients
  - President: Dr Nguyen Van Thuong
- 2018 — Boston, USA
  - Theme: Children, Research, and Hope for the Future
  - President: Yan Valle
- 2017 — São Paulo, Brazil
  - Theme: Step Up for Vitiligo: A Call for Truth, Hope and Change!
  - President: Dr Paulo Cunha
- 2016 — Prague, Czech Republic
  - Theme: not announced
  - President: Dr Jana Hercogova
- 2015 — Shenyang, China
  - Theme: not announced
  - President: Dr Xing-Hua Gao
- 2014 — Chandigarh, India
  - Theme: Holistic Management for Vitiligo
  - President: Dr Davinder Parsad
- 2013 — Detroit, USA
  - Theme: not announced
  - President: Dr Henry Lim
- 2012 — Rome, Italy
  - Theme: not announced
  - President: Dr Torello Lotti
- 2011 — Lagos, Nigeria
  - Theme: Purple Fun Day^{1}
  - President: Ogo Maduewesi

^{1} The "Purple Fun Day" event on 25 June 2011 is considered a direct precursor to World Vitiligo Day; the official global campaign began in 2012.
