= Vitiligo Research Foundation =

American non-profit organization

The Vitiligo Research Foundation Inc. (VRF) is a United States-registered 501(c)(3) non-profit organisation whose mission is “to end the suffering of people living with vitiligo through research, care and education.”

The Vitiligo Research Foundation was established in 2010 by philanthropist Dmitry Aksenov, founder of the Vienna Contemporary art fair, after his young daughter was diagnosed with vitiligo. To streamline his previously scattered charitable efforts, Aksenov created one organisation to speed up research and improve patient care. VRF has been led by chief executive officer Prof. Yan Valle since its inception and operates as a remote-first entity with a small administrative office in Manhattan.

== Main initiatives ==
=== Research infrastructure ===
Vitiligo Biobank – federated network of biosample repositories launched in 2013 and now spanning more than ten countries.

CloudBank – secure platform for de-identified clinical data and research tools.

=== Global awareness ===
Founder and International secretariat of World Vitiligo Day since 2012; supplies campaign materials, maintains the annual event calendar and coordinates a presidential committee that selects each year’s host city and theme, and hosts annual event.

=== Digital resources ===
World Vitiligo Map – online directory of clinics, researchers and support groups.

Vitiligo Patient Journey Map — an interactive bird’s eye view of a patient journey through the healthcare and support maze.

Vitiligo.ai – AI-based assistant offering personalised disease-management guidance.

=== Education and outreach ===
Produces master-classes, podcasts, patient handbooks and scientific papers; offers small research grants and clinical-trial listings for physicians and investigators.

== History, governance, and funding ==
VRF accepts no government funding. Grants from pharmaceutical companies account for less than 50 % of its annual budget; the balance comes from private philanthropy, individual donations and crowdfunding.

IRS Form 990 filings indicate that more than 80 % of yearly expenditure is directed to research, awareness and education programmes.

The organisation is overseen by an unpaid board of directors chaired by dermatologist Prof Torello Lotti and a scientific advisory board whose members represent academic centres in North America, Europe and Asia.
