= Global Running Day =

Celebration day

- Observed by: Worldwide
- Celebrations: Running
- Date: First Wednesday in June
- 2025 date: June 4
- 2026 date: June 3
- 2027 date: June 2
- 2028 date: June 7
- First time: June 1, 2016

Global Running Day is a day that celebrates the sport of running. It is held annually on the first Wednesday of June. Participants of all ages and abilities pledge to take part in some type of running activity by submitting their names through the Global Running Day website.

== History ==
Global Running Day was formerly known as National Running Day and began in the United States. The first event was in 2009.

The inaugural Global Running Day was held on June 1, 2016. More than 2.5 million people from 177 countries pledged to run more than 9.2 million miles. New York City Mayor, Bill de Blasio, declared June 1, 2016, to be Global Running Day in the City of New York. The 2014 Boston Marathon winner Meb Keflezighi led a group run from the Boston Run Base, and the Atlanta Track Club organized a "run around the clock" event, where at least one person from the Atlanta metro area would be running every hour of Global Running Day.

In 2017, the International Association of Athletics Federations supported Global Running Day. "The IAAF fully supports the Global Running Day and is proud to invite all of our Member Federations to join us and the world's leading race organisers in this massive celebration of the sport", said IAAF CEO Olivier Gers.

In 2018, New York Road Runners celebrated its 60th anniversary on with a finish line celebration on Global Running Day on Wednesday, June 6, during the same week NYRR was founded in 1958.

In 2019, many local running stores and clubs held independent events. For example, the Carmel Runners Club in Indiana did a group run that ended at a brewery. Runners’ Choice in Kingston, Ontario, had a group run with giveaways.

In 2020, Global Running Day was virtual due to COVID-19.

The 2021 event was also virtually hosted globally by the New York Road Runners with a free virtual 1-mile event.

== The Million Kid Run ==
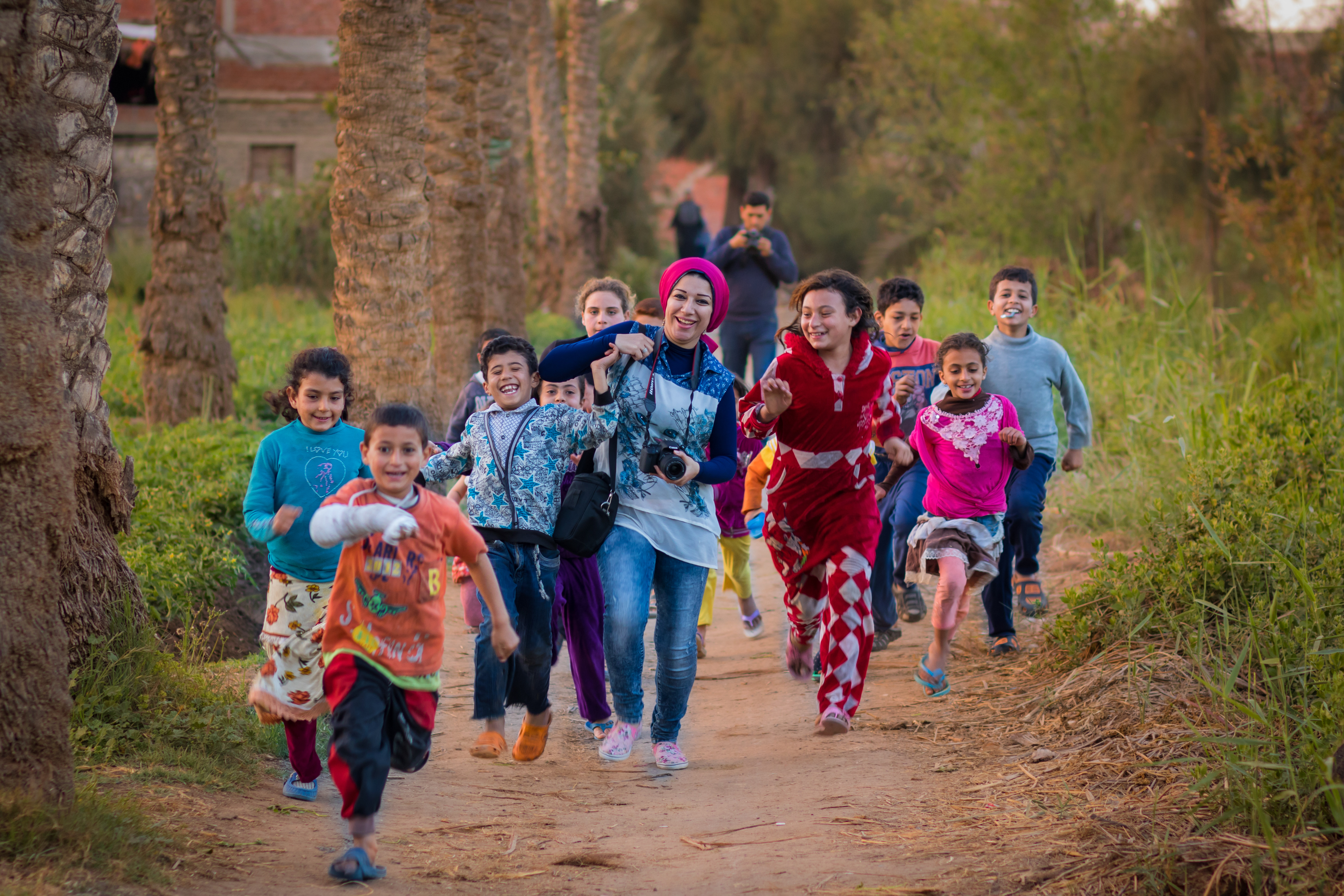
Million Kid Run

The Million Kid Run is the youth division of Global Running Day and aims to have one million kids around the world participate in Global Running Day. Its focus is on making fitness fun, and inspiring kids to embrace running as a way to remain healthy and fit. In 2016, 672,030 youths took part. For the Inaugural Million Kid Run, students from around the world participated.

== Global supporters ==
More than 100 organizations support Global Running Day and the Million Kid Run, including the Abbott World Marathon Majors, Atlanta Track Club, Boston Athletic Association, Competitor Group, Houston Marathon Foundation, International Association of Athletics Federations, Athletics for a Better World program, National Cleanup Day, New York Road Runners, Plogging, Running USA, Twin Cities In Motion, USA Track & Field, 100meta – Grupo de corrida e caminhada and more.
