= Arancio =

Arancio may refer to:

- Lago Arancio, lake in Sicily
- Francesco Arancio (1844–?), Italian painter
- Orazio Arancio (born 1967), Italian rugby player
