= Monte Adranone =

Mountain in Italy

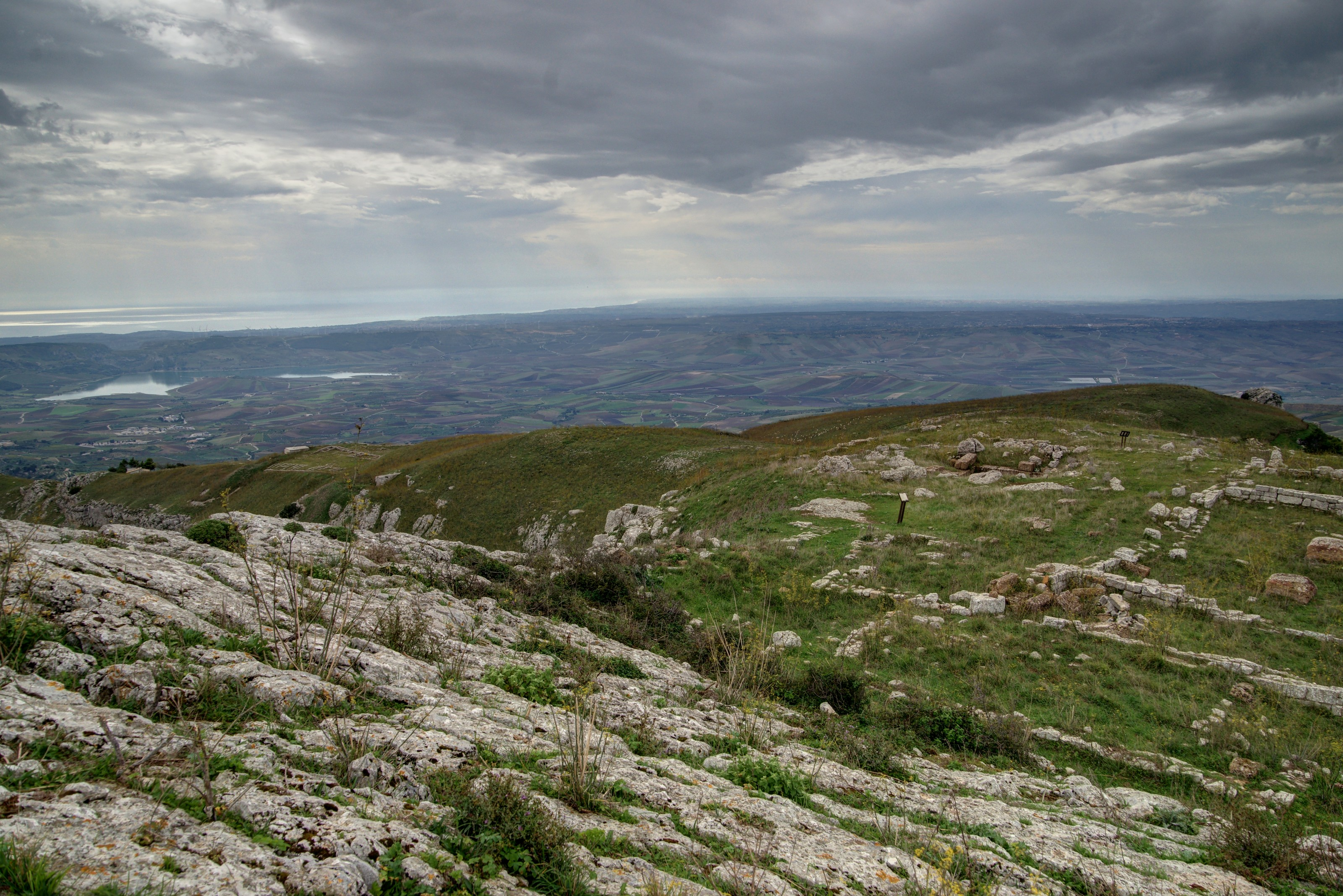
- View over the acropolis of Monte Adranone

Highest point
- Elevation: 899 m (2,949 ft)
- Coordinates: 37°41′16.57″N 13°8′40.18″E

Geography
- province: Agrigento

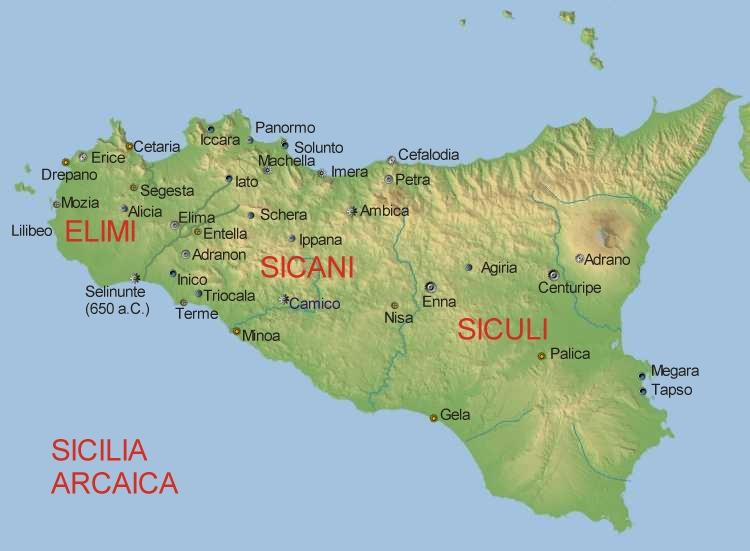
Ancient Pre-Hellenic Sicily

Monte Adranone is a mountain rising 900 metres above sea level in the north of the comune of Sambuca di Sicilia, in the Province of Agrigento.

At the summit of the mountain are the remains of an ancient city, possibly Adranon, and one of the more important archaeological sites of Magna Graecia in Sicily.

The city is distinct from the Adranon in eastern Sicily and is possibly mentioned by Diodorus Siculus in his account of the First Punic War. Its identification was proposed by Klüver and taken up by Holm in consideration of essential toponymic data (the site dominates the crags of a hilly district called Adragna) and now is supported by archaeological data from the systematic excavations that unambiguously demonstrated a general and violent destruction of the city around the middle of the 3rd century BC with sporadic presence, perhaps of garrisons, during the Second Punic War.

== The site ==
The ancient city was settled at the beginning of the 5th century BC and was undoubtedly a Selinunte colony, lying between the Hellenized Sican area and the Punic Elymian area, with a decisive pre-eminence of the Punic component from the beginning of the 4th century. The imposing ruins indicate the strategic importance of the site which dominated the road that connected Selinunte with Akragas. It may have been the cornerstone of the defense system built by the Carthaginians. It was destroyed during the 3rd century BC according to archaeological excavations.

Regular excavations started in 1968 since when annual systematic campaigns have brought to light the necropolis, the mighty walls and vast sectors of the city and suburban area.

The city extended over an almost triangular undulating territory culminating in the NE with the sacred area of the acropolis and sloping down to terraces towards the SW in the direction of the deep saddle that distinguishes the two hills on which the entire inhabited area develops and which perhaps coincided with a fundamental road axis of the city itself. The necropolis extended south of the inhabited area, in the area that currently corresponds to the entrance area of the archaeological area and the antiquarium.

In the area around the entrance to the archaeological area is the necropolis containing the monumental Tomba della Regina. Further towards the summit of Monte Adranone are the walls of the fortified part of the city, the artisans' quarter and a sanctuary surrounded by a temenos (sacred area), with a sacellum in front of it, where votive offerings were deposited.

=== The city walls ===
The perimeter of the city is over 6 km long. For a stretch of the eastern side it is defined by the rocky overhang, while for the rest it consists of an imposing wall built in blocks of local stone and preserved in some sections at about 6 m in height. The walls date from end of the 6th/beginning of the 5th c. BC, with Punic reconstruction in the 4th century with the addition of towers and buttresses, while at the beginning of the 3rd century BC the southern entrance of the city was strengthened during the First Punic War.

== Palazzo Panitteri Archaeological Museum ==
Numerous votive offerings have been recovered from the city of Adranon, as well as amphorae, terracottas, busts of divinities, Attic pottery and bronze items. Many of these discoveries are on display in the Palazzo Panitteri Archaeological Museum, located in the historic centre of Sambuca di Sicilia.

== Images ==
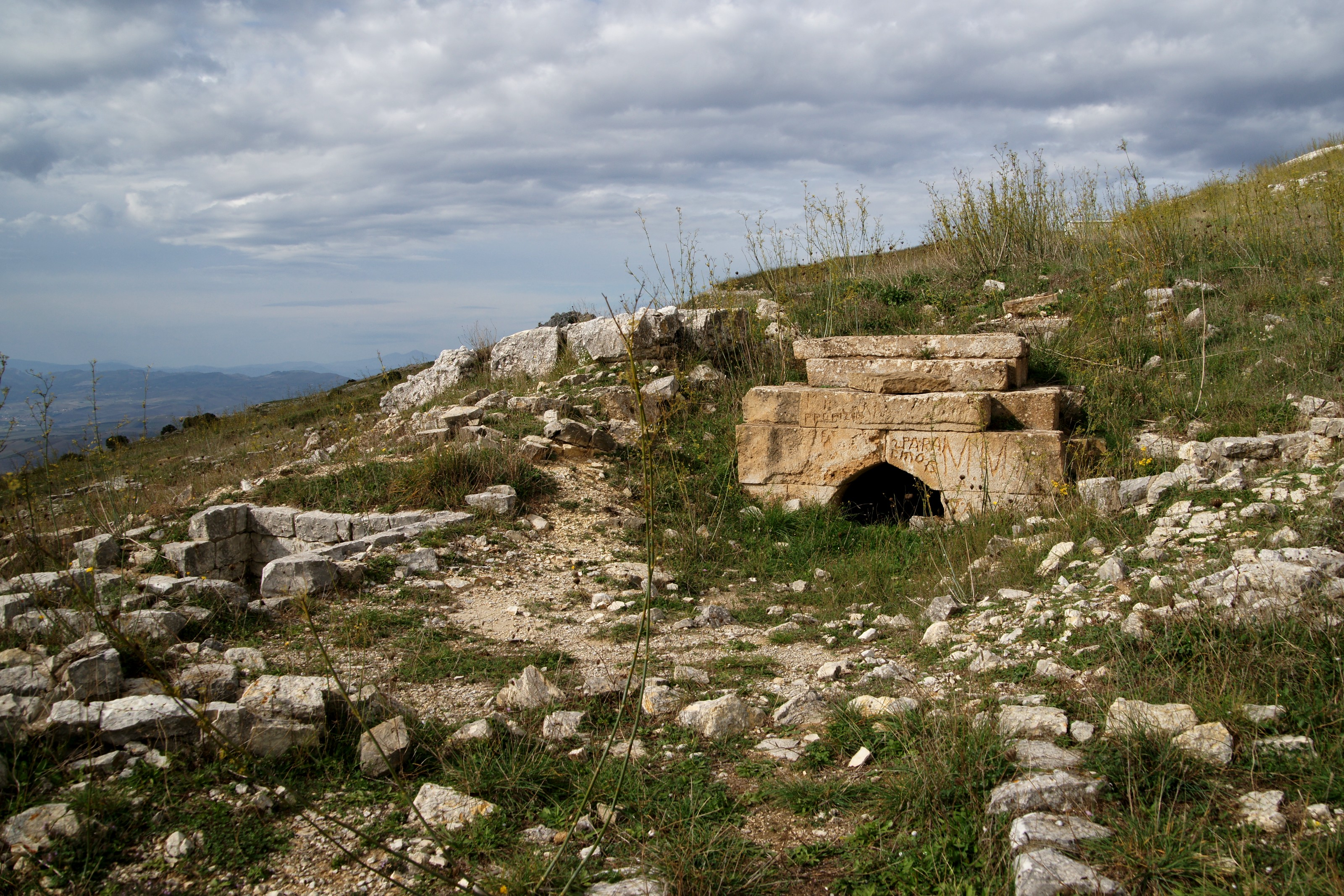
The tomba della regina

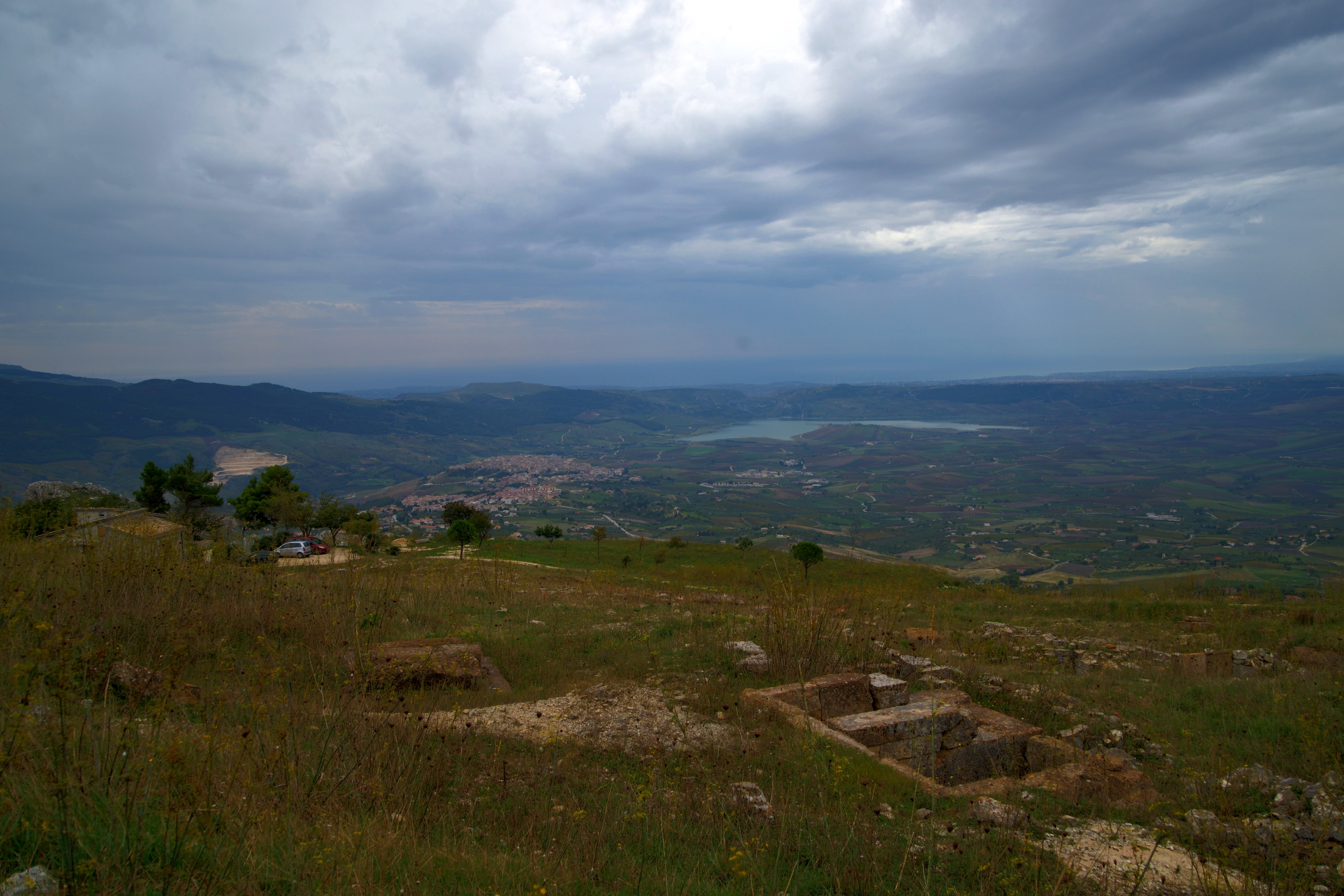
Necropolis

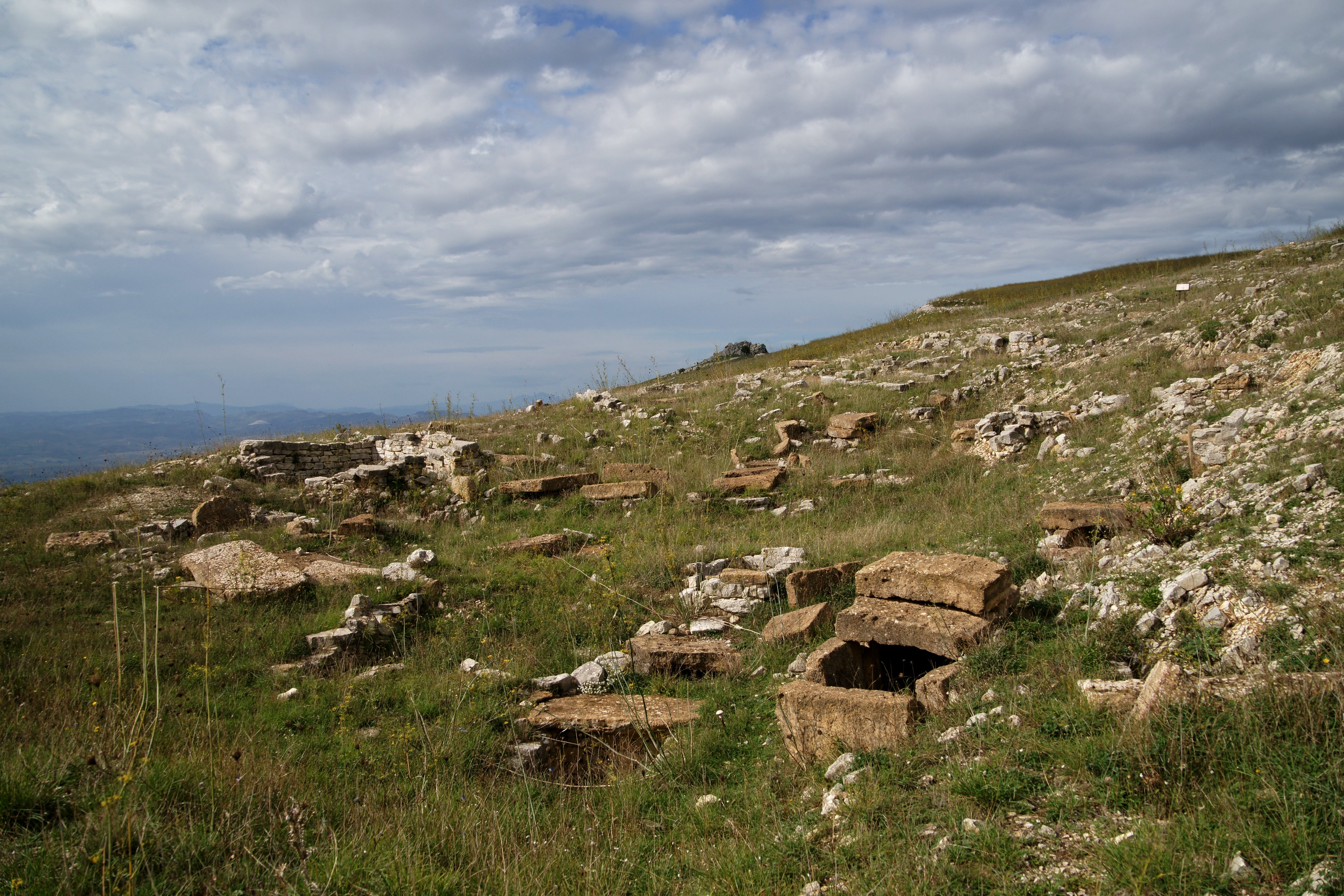
Necropolis

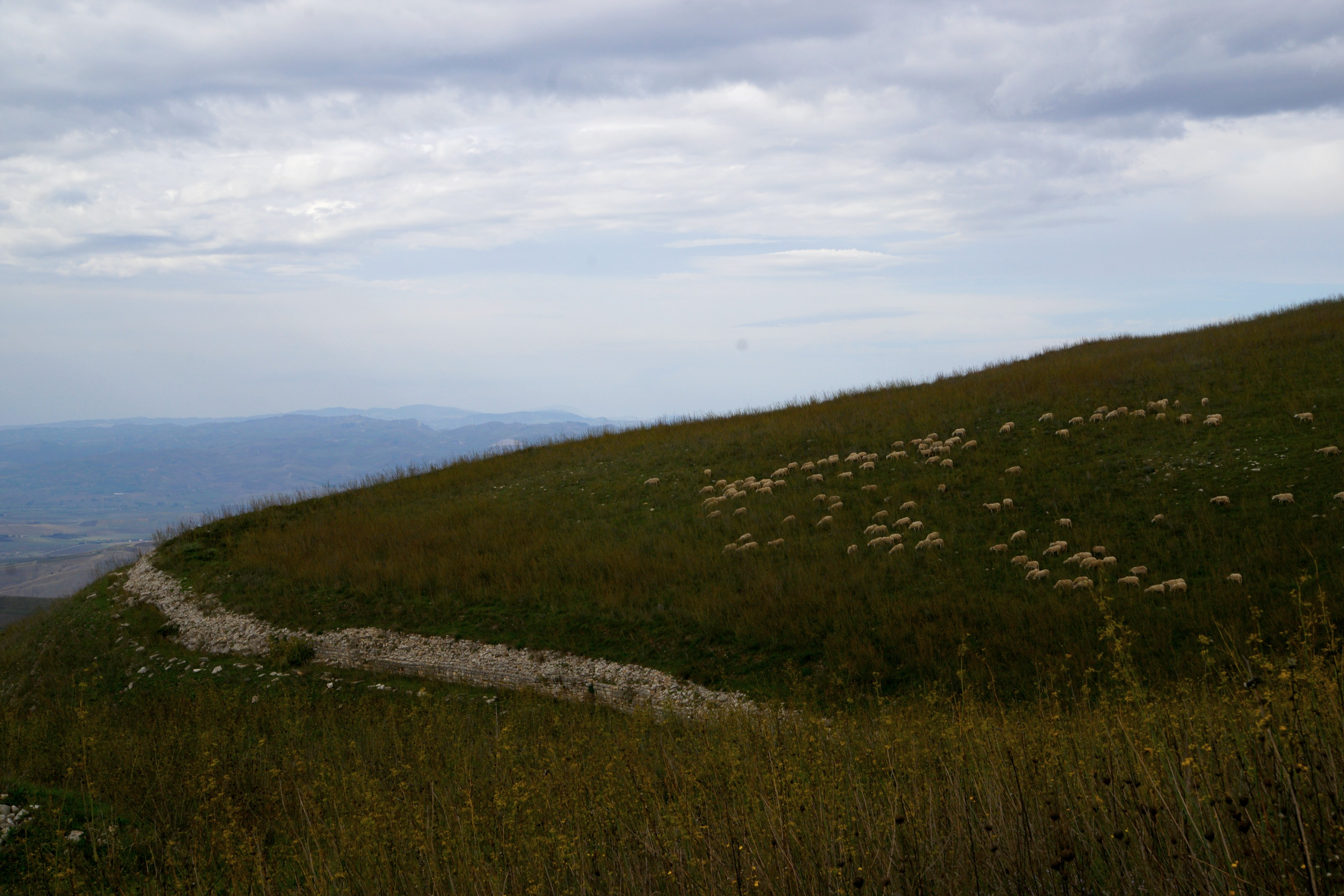
City wall

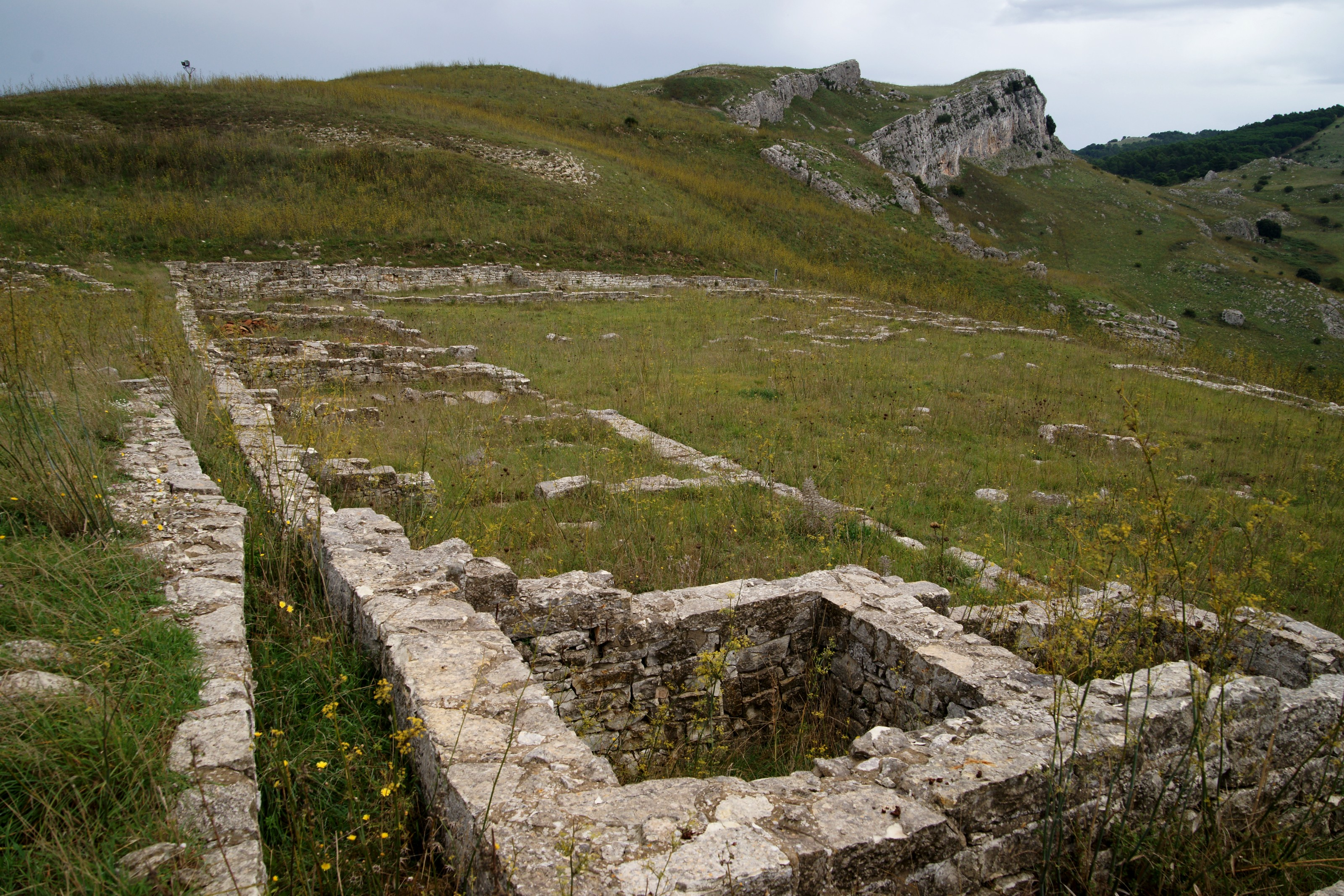
Artisans' quarter

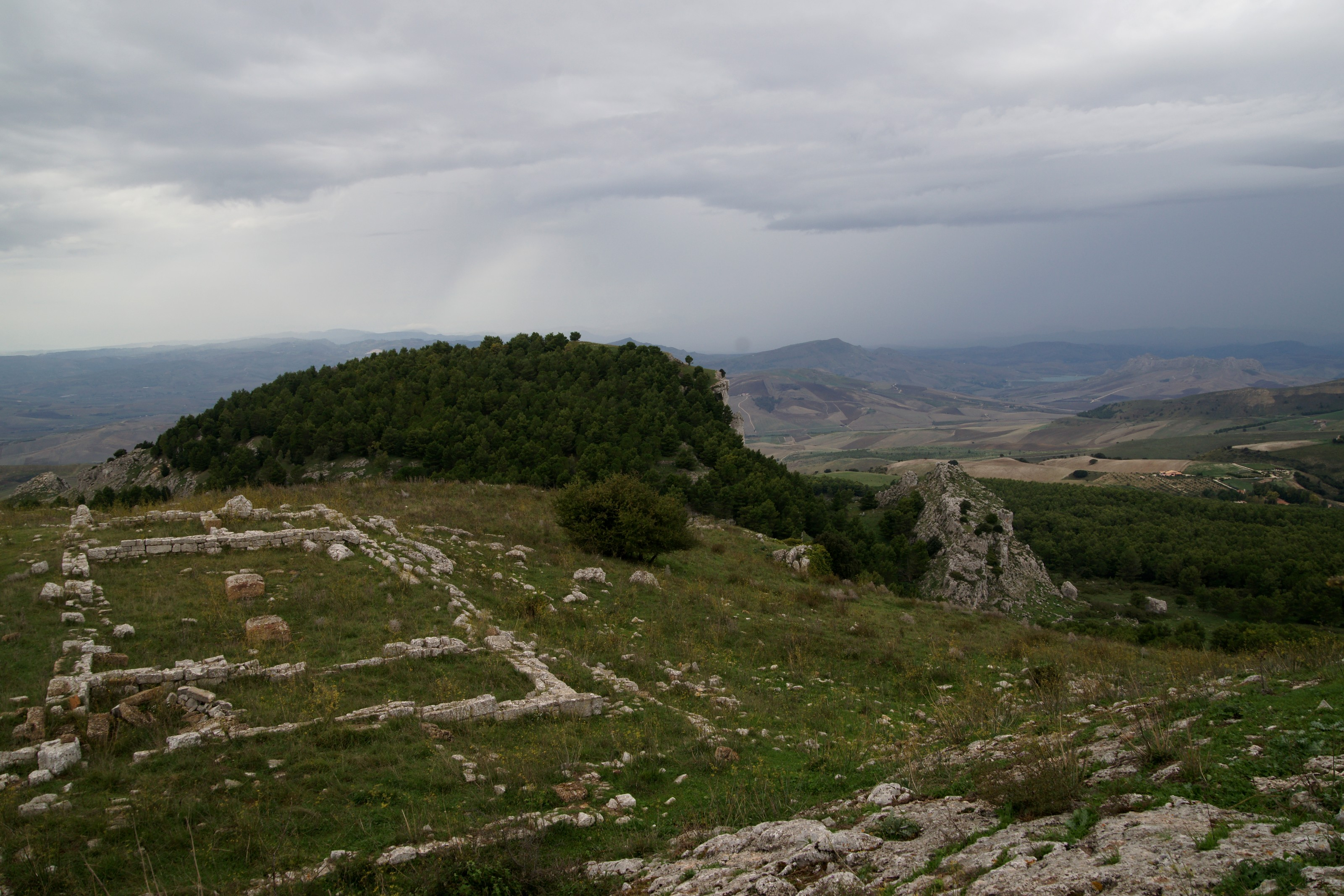
Acropolis temple

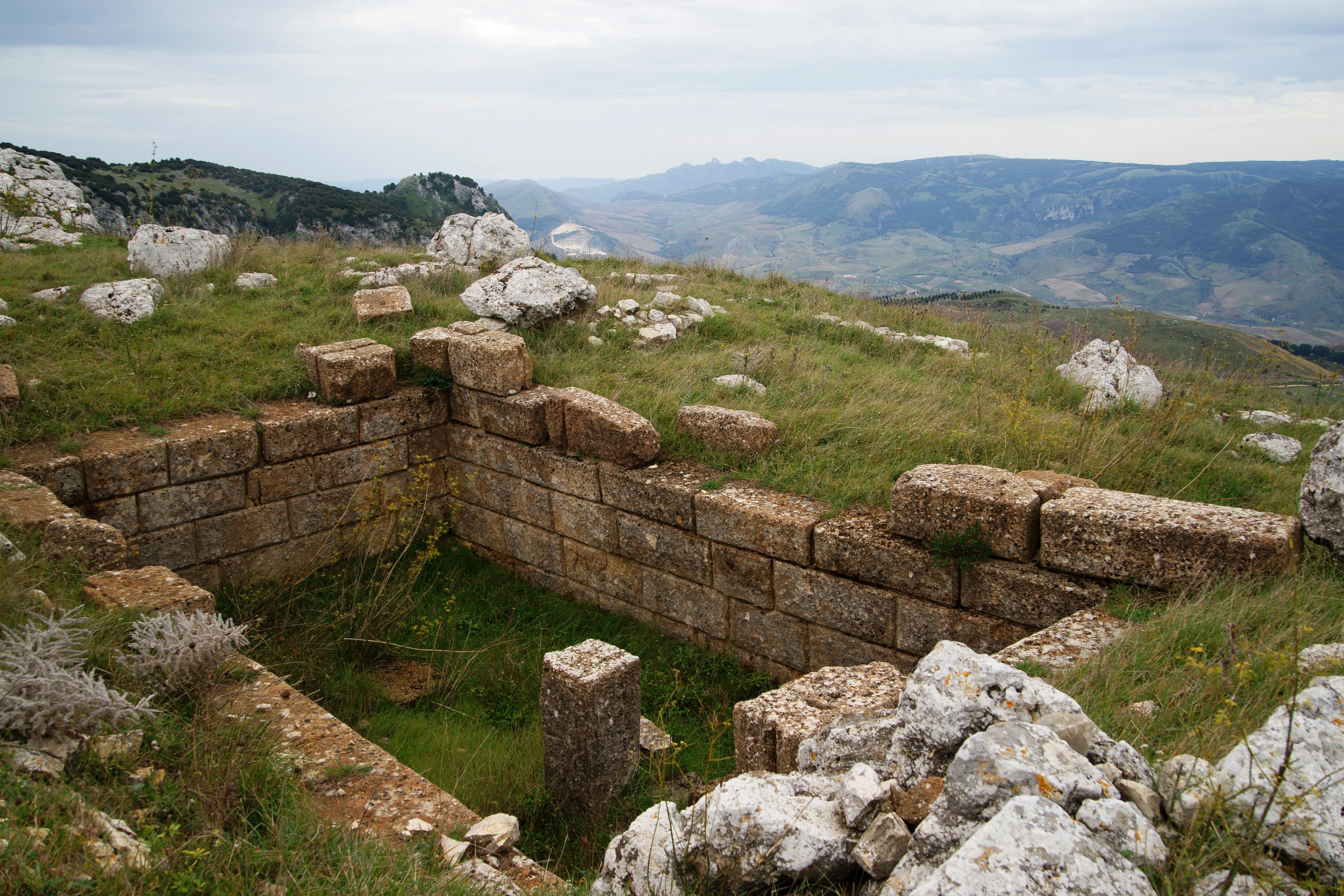
Acropolis cistern

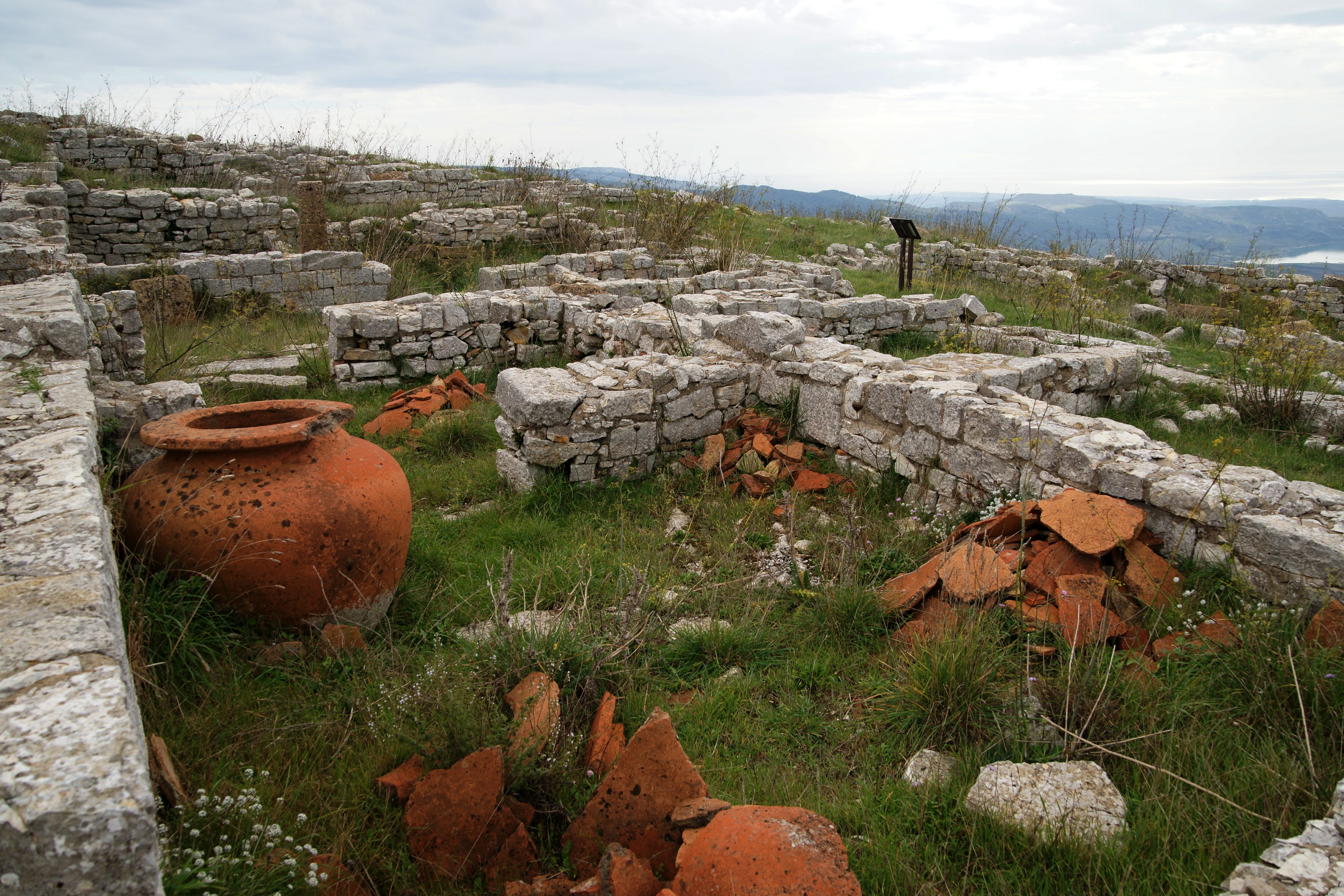
Magazines under the acropolis
