= Madonna dell'Udienza =

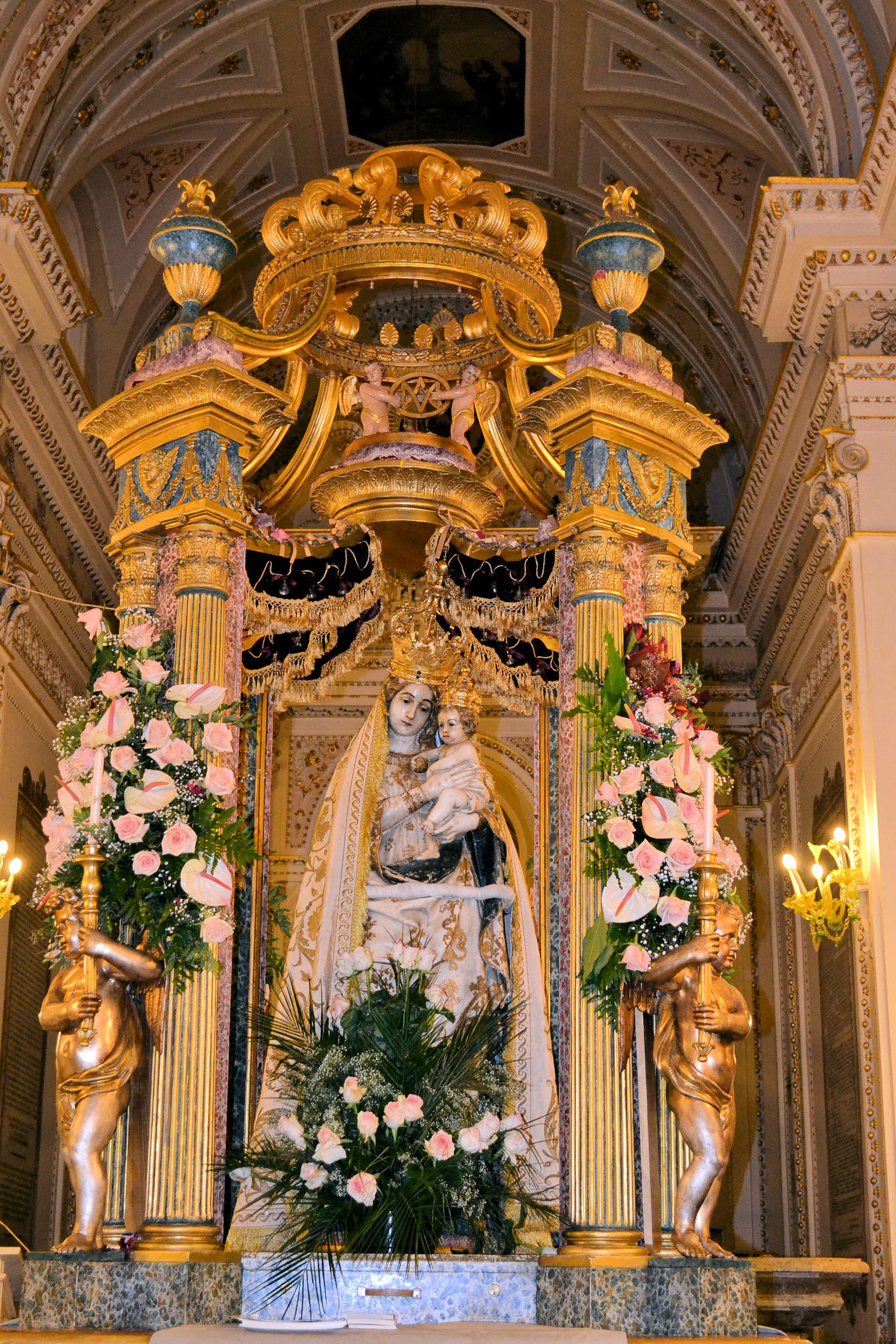
La Madonna dell'Udienza in the Sanctuary at Sambuca di Sicilia.

Maria Santissima dell'Udienza or Madona dell'Udienza or Our Lady of the Audience is a marble sculpture created by the Renaissance sculptor Antonello Gagini, in the early 1500s. The statue is currently housed in the apse of the Sanctuary of Our Lady of the Audience in Sambuca di Sicilia, Italy.

On the evening of the third Sunday of May, the statue is carried in procession through the main streets of the historical center of Sambuca di Sicilia, supported on the shoulders of members of the Confraternita Maria SS. della'Udienza (Brotherhood of Our Lady of the Audience).

== History ==
The sculpture depicting the Virgin Mary with the Child Jesus goes back to the early sixteenth century. A wealthy family brought the statue to Sambuca di Sicilia to the area of Cellaro Tower, part of the fortifications of the area. It lay hidden there for many years inside a cavity of oven kitchens of the tower, and was found by a Sambucese farmer in 1575. During that time a plague was raging through Sambuca. The local farmers decided to take the statue and parade it through the neighborhood infirmary, which was the area of the country dedicated to the care of lepers, in the hope that Our Lady would perform a miracle. At that he statue was attributed to healing the leprosy and it became known as Our Lady of the Audience, because she heard the prayers of the sick.

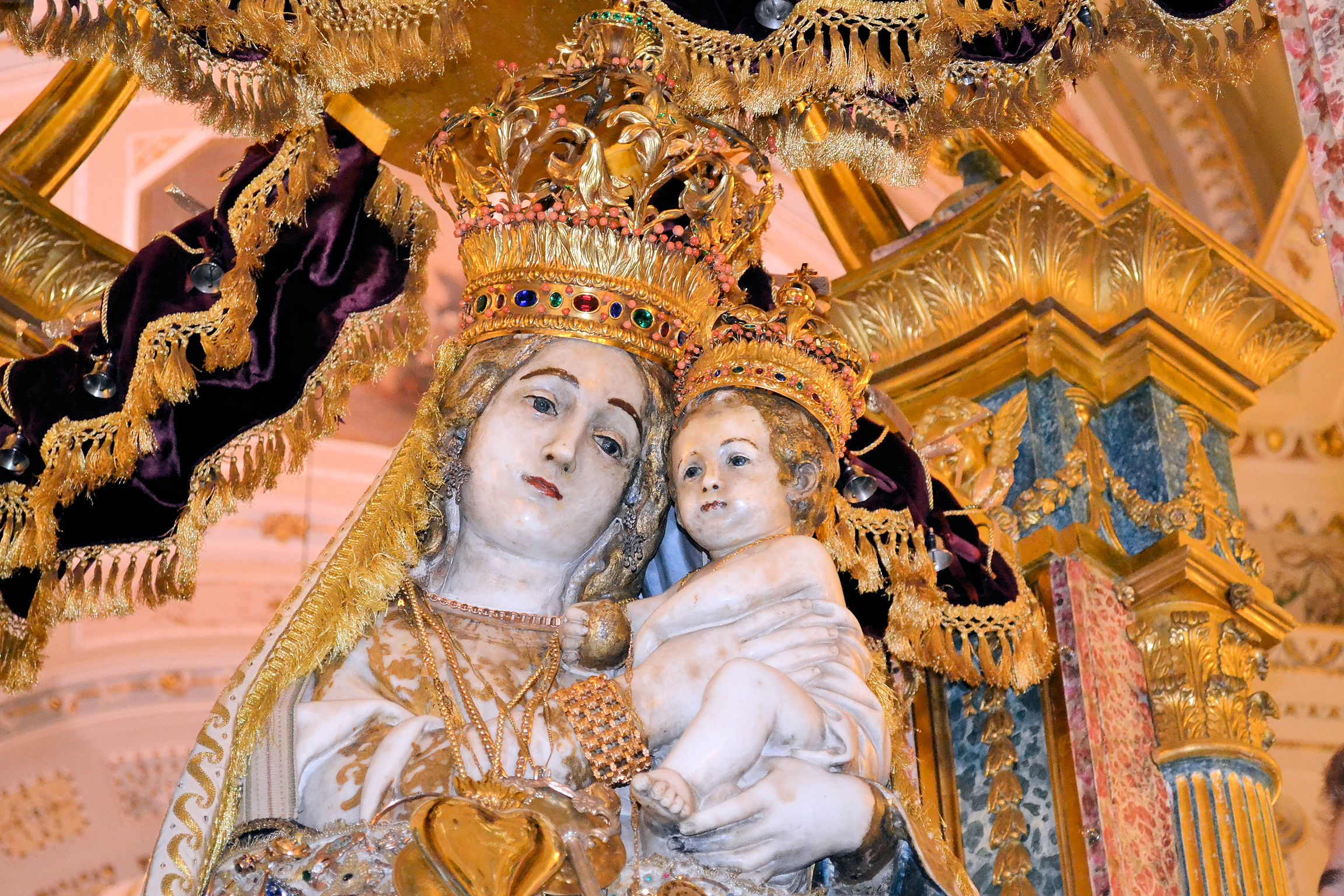
A close-up of the statue.

== Fest of Our Lady of the Audience ==
Since the statue was brought to Sambuca in 1575 an annual celebration has been held in honor of Our Lady of the Audience. The statue is removed from the church and hoisted upon the shoulders of members of Confraternita Maria SS. della'Udienza (Brotherhood of Our Lady of the Audience). It passes through the main streets of the historical center and is paraded about around the city. The procession is accompanied by prayers, hymns, and folk music played by the local municipal band, and lasts until the dawn on the following Monday. It ends with a fireworks display.

Madonna dell’Udenzia is venerated elsewhere in Sicily: in Ciminna at the Church of St. John the Baptist, there is a triptych dating to the 1600s depicting the miracle; in Petralia Soprana, there is a replica statue, and church dedicated to Madonna dell’Udenzia. Devotions to the Madona dell’Udenzia are also held in other villages in including Mezzojuso and Roccamena.

=== In the United States ===
Sicilians brought the celebration to a number of churches in the United States, including Holy Rosary Catholic Church of Kansas City, Missouri, where the Feast has been celebrated since the church was founded in 1890. A local family brought a replica of the statue of Our Lady of the Audience when they immigrated and it is celebrated with an annual processional with an honor guard from the Knights of Columbus.

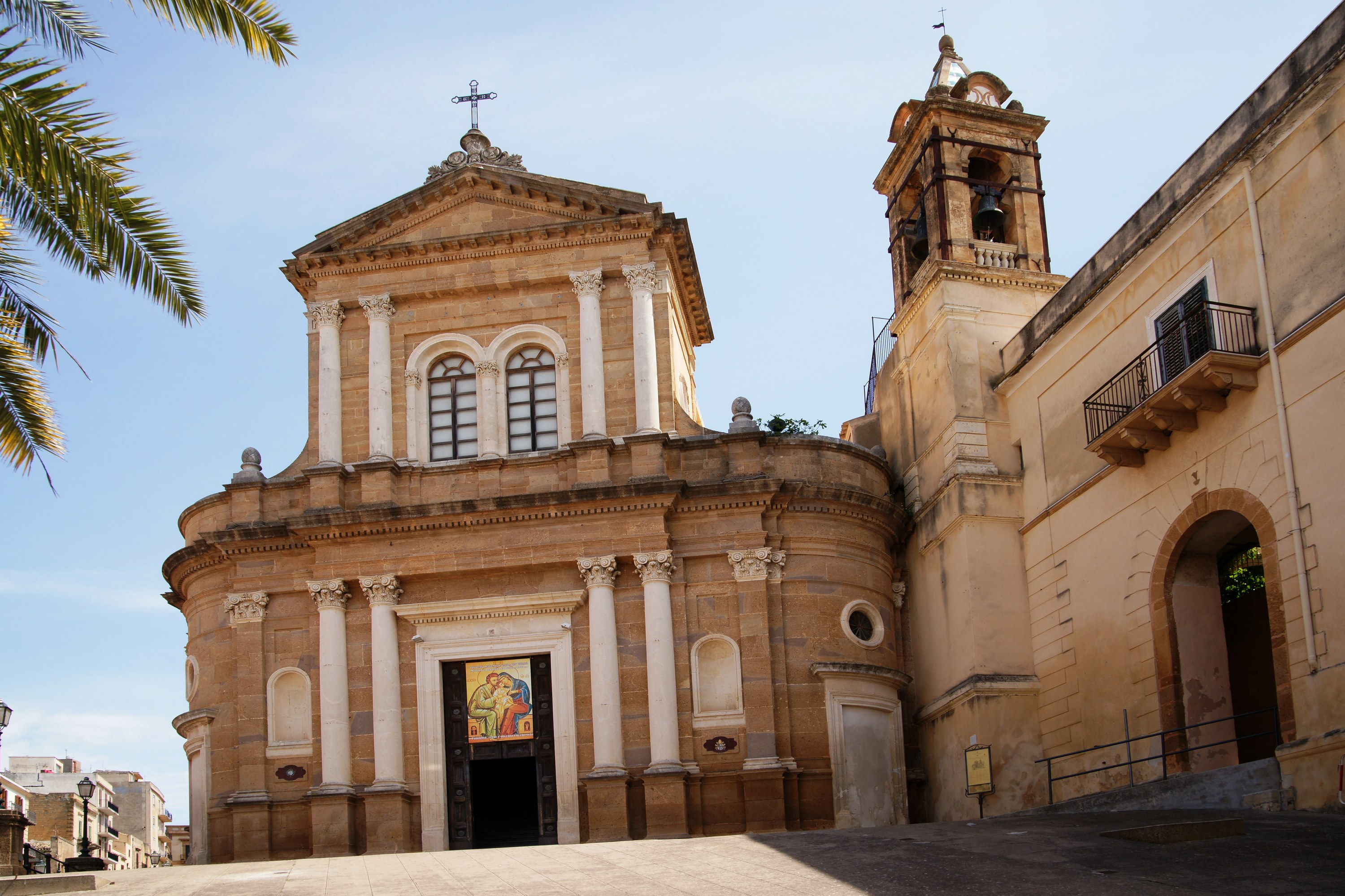
Santuario di Maria SS. dell'Udienza. All'interno di esso è collocata la statua della Madonna dell'Udienza
