= Fortino di Mazzallakkar =

- Sambuca di Sicilia, Sicily, Italy
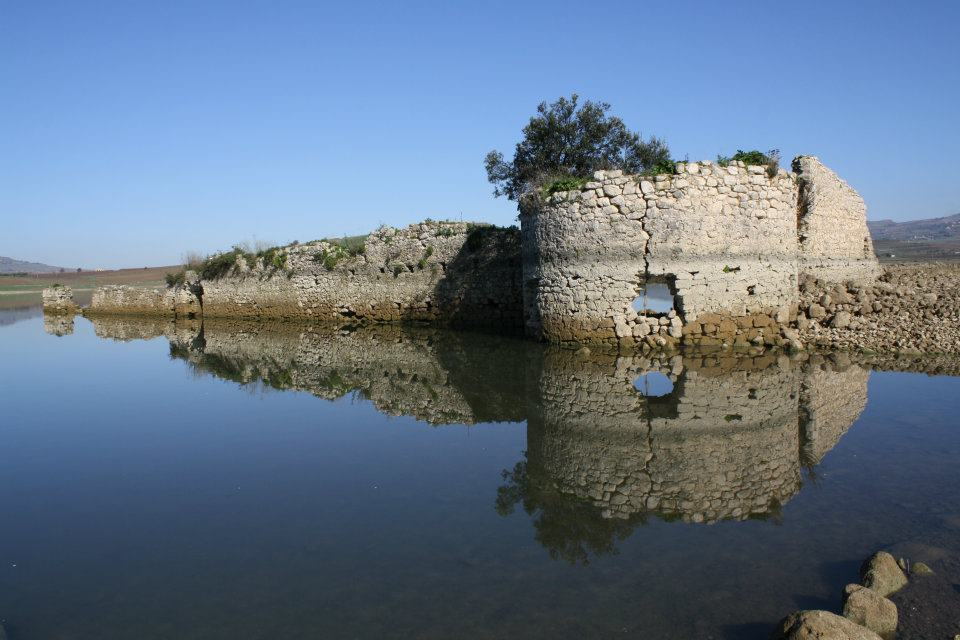
- Fortino di Mazzallakkar and Lago Arancio

Site information
- Type: Fort
- Owner: Private
- Open to the public: On request
- Condition: Ruins

Location
- Coordinates: 37°37′47.31″N 13°4′31.14″E
- Height: up to 4 m (13 ft)

Site history
- Built: c. 830
- Built by: Arabs
- Materials: Limestone

The Fortino di Mazzallakkar is a ruined Arab fort in Sambuca di Sicilia, Sicily. It is located near Lago Arancio, and is partially submerged by its waters for six months of every year.

== History ==
The Fortino di Mazzallakkar was built by the Arabs in around 830 AD, possibly to defend the territory around Sambuca di Sicilia, which was then known as Zabut.

The fort was still in good condition until the mid-20th century, and it was used as a shelter for sheep and cattle. In the 1950s, the Carboj dam was built, causing the flooding of Lago Arancio. The fort is located at the edge of the lake, and is partially submerged around 6 months of the year. This has caused a lot of damage to the fort.

The fort is privately owned, and can be visited on request.

== Layout ==
The fort originally had a square shape, with a circular tower on each corner. The towers had limestone domes and were equipped with slits. The walls were up to 4 m (13 ft) high.
