= Sambuca di Sicilia =

Administrative division in Sicily, Italy

- Comune
- Comune di Sambuca di Sicilia
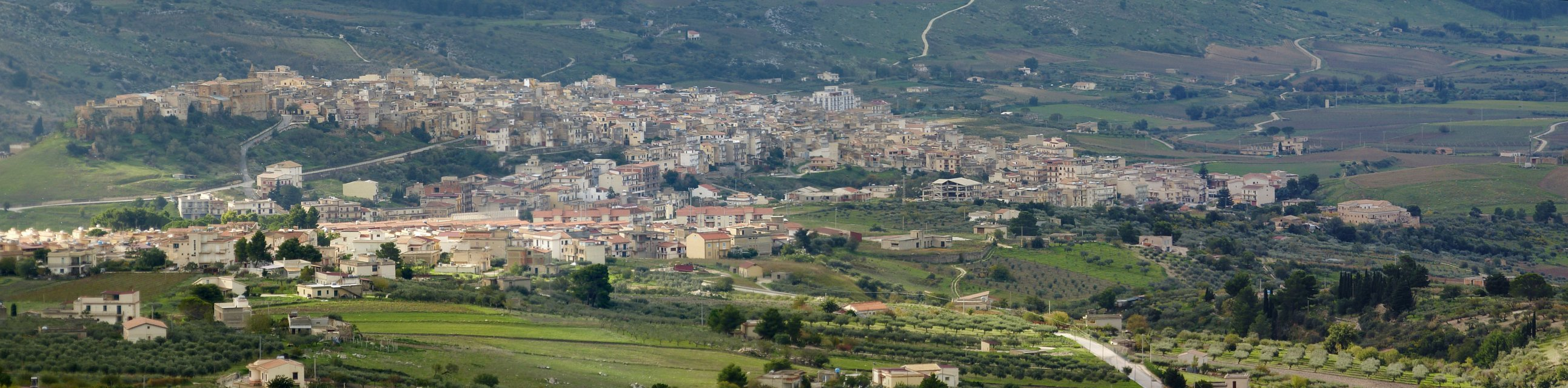
- View of Sambuca di Sicilia

- Location within Italy Location within Sicily
- Coordinates: 37.6488307°N 13.1128226°E
- Country: Italy
- Region: Sicily
- Province: Agrigento (AG)

Government
  - Mayor: Giuseppe Cacioppo

Area
  - Total: 96.37 km^{2} (37.21 sq mi)
- Elevation: 364 m (1,194 ft)

Population (30 November 2016)
  - Total: 5,878
  - Density: 60.99/km^{2} (158.0/sq mi)
- Demonym(s): Sambucese, Sammucaru
- Time zone: UTC+1 (CET)
  - Summer (DST): UTC+2 (CEST)
- Postal code: 92017
- Dialing code: 0925
- Patron saint: St. George
- Saint day: 23 April
- Website: Official website

Sambuca di Sicilia (Sicilian: Sammuca or Zabut) is a comune (municipality) in the Province of Agrigento in the Italian region Sicily, located about 68 kilometres (42 mi) southwest of Palermo and about 89 kilometres (55 mi) northwest of Agrigento. It is one of I Borghi più belli d'Italia ("The most beautiful villages of Italy").

Sambuca di Sicilia borders the following municipalities; Bisacquino, Caltabellotta, Contessa Entellina, Giuliana, Menfi, Santa Margherita di Belice, and Sciacca.

Sambuca di Sicilia in Agrigento

== History ==
The origins of the name Sambuca are uncertain. The main assumptions: from the Greek stringed instrument Sambuca ; or from Sambucus, commonly referred to as elderberry plants, widespread since antiquity in the valley of Lake Arancio. Leonardo Sciascia breaks down the name Sambuca in As-Sambuqah and interprets it as a "remote place". Until 1928 the town was called Sambuca Zabut. In 1928, Benito Mussolini removed "Zabut" and added "di Sicilia".

Sambuca, founded by ancient Greek colonists, rose to regional prominence as a trading hub after invading Arab Muslims took over around 830, a few years after their landing in Sicily. According to the folk tradition, It was called Zabuth, in remembrance of the emir Zabut ("The Splendid One") Al-Arab, who built a castle at that place, on the slopes of Mount Genuardo, between the rivers Belice and Sosius, 350 meters above sea level. Zabut Al-Maghrebi was a follower of the ascetic Ibn Mankud, "Burning Warrior of faith," Lord of the independent Kabyle of Trapani, Marsala, Sciacca.

Zabut was inhabited by a Muslim population until the 13th century, when it was conquered by Frederick II.

From the 15th to 19th centuries, Sambuca experienced alternating extremes of prosperity and poor economic times. The court passed the Roman family Barberini and new neighborhoods were built, the city wall was expanded, and palaces, baronial mansions, churches, monasteries, and convents were built. The Land of Sambuca was promoted from barony to marquessate with the privilege of Philip II of Spain (Madrid 15 November 1570). On 16 September 1666, the Marquessate of Sambuca passed to the Beccadelli family from Bologna, who had risen to the rank of princes of the Principality of Camporeale.

Sambuca in the 19th century was rich with culture, and in those years an enlightened middle class emerged.

The town's population declined in the 21st century due to its lacking economy and low birth rate. The population in the 2010s was 5834. Since the 2012 census, the town has seen a decrease of over 200 inhabitants.

Sambuca di Sicilia gained international media attention in January 2019 for selling homes in an auction with a starting price of €1, in hopes of attracting foreign residents to stop the area's depopulation. This became the basis for the HGTV documentary television series shot there, My Big Italian Adventure, starring American actress Lorraine Bracco and chronicling her months-long effort to renovate a roughly 200-year-old €1 townhouse at Via Guglielmo Marconi.

== Geography ==
The city has an area of 37 square miles (96 km^{2}). The territory of Sambuca di Sicilia is located in 42.25 miles (67.99 km) from Palermo, about 21 miles (34 km) from the archaeological park of Selinunte, and about 21 miles (34 km) from Lido Fiori, location of a Blue Flag beach. Perched on a hill, with a Belvedere terrace at its peak, the town is surrounded by hills and woods, Mount Genuardo (3,305 feet - 1,007 m), and the valleys of the river Carboj that form the reservoir of Lake Arancio.

== Main sights ==
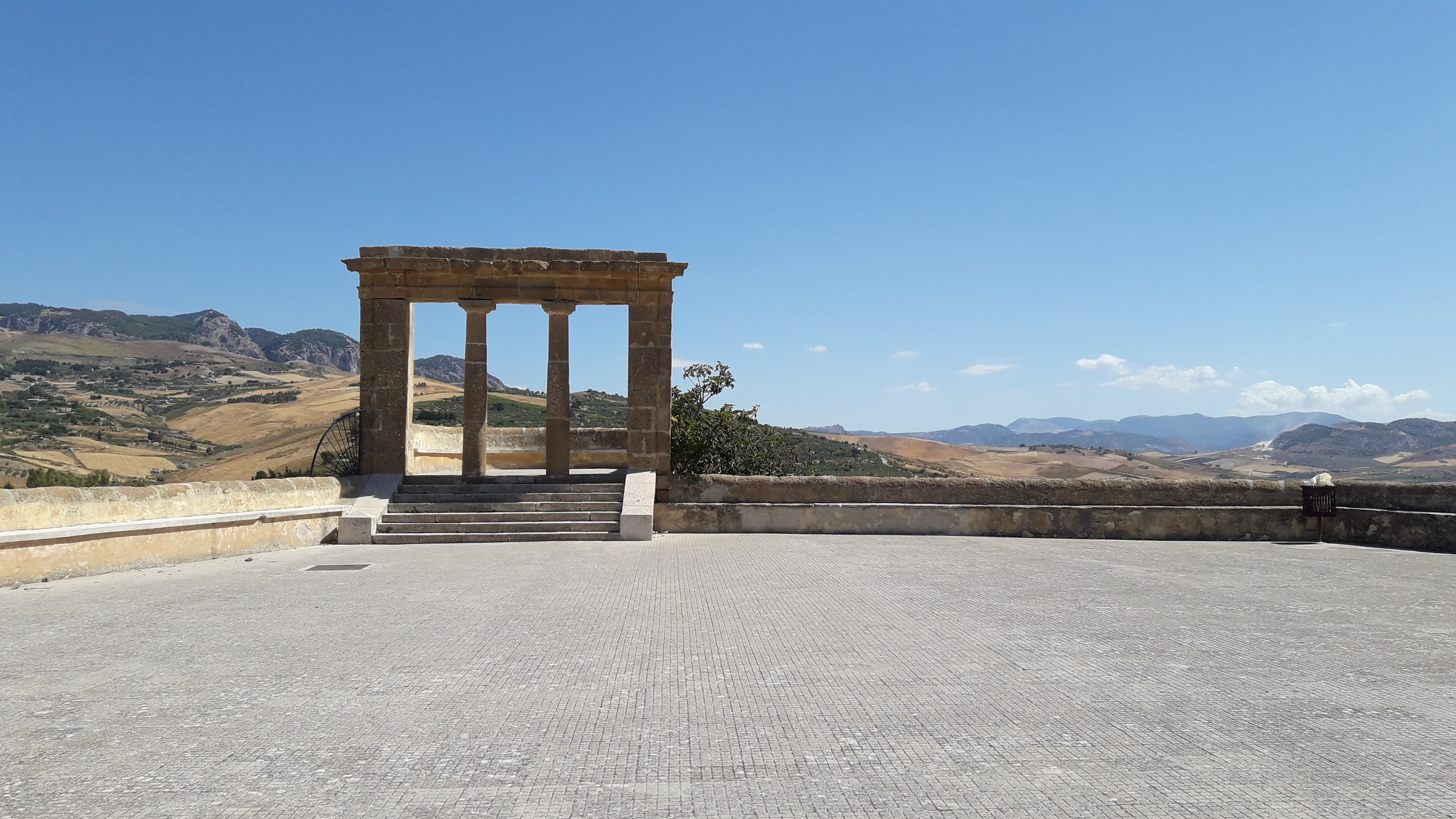
Belvedere terrace

- Belvedere terrace
- remains of the castle of the Emir.
- palace Panitteri (17th century), home of the ethno-anthropological museum)
- Palazzo dell'Arpa (town hall)
- Palazzo Ciaccio
- setti vaneddi (seven Saracen alleyways)

Outside the center, are the ancient towers of Pandolfina and Cellaro, the Fortino di Mazzallakkar which emerge only in the summer months when the lake level is lowered. On Adranon mountain there is the 4th century BC archaeological complex. There is an old Arab house in the holiday area of Adragna.

== Churches ==
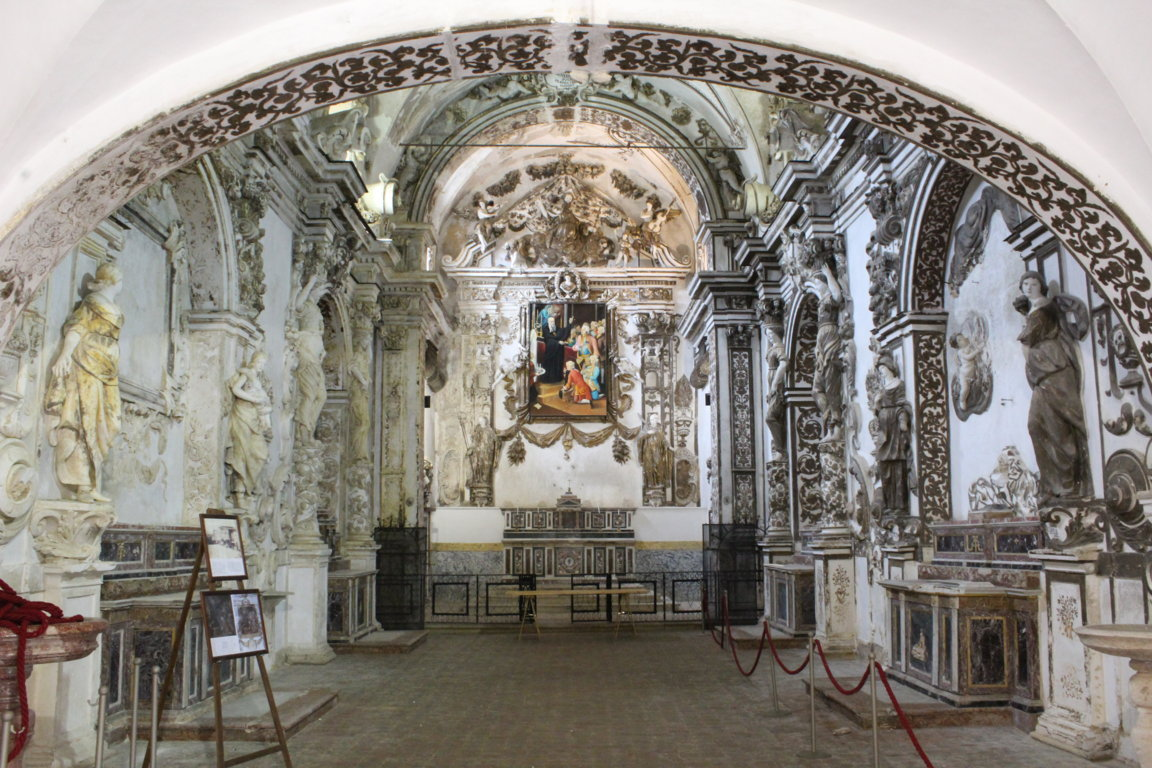
Chiesa di Santa Caterina.

- Santuario di Maria SS. dell'Udienza and Carmelites convent
  - Church of the Carmine with Antonello Gagini's marble statue of the Our Lady of the Audience
- Chiesa della Matrice
- Chiesa di San Michele Arcangelo
  - Church of St. Michael Archangel with its wooden equestrian statue of St. George, patron Saint of Sambuca di Sicilia, slaying the dragon.
- Chiesa del Rosario
- Chiesa della Madonna dei Vassalli
- Chiesa del Purgatorio
- Chiesa di Santa Caterina d'Alessandria and Benedictine monastery
- Chiesa della Concezione
- Chiesa di Gesù e Maria
- Chiesa di San Giuseppe
- Chiesa di San Calogero
- Chiesa di Santa Lucia
- Chiesa di Sant'Antonino
- Chiesa della Bammina
- Chiesa di San Giuseppe del Serrone
- Chiesa di San Giovanni Battista
- Convento dei Cappuccini
- Collegio di Maria
- Monastero di Santa Caterina d'Alessandria

== Twin towns ==
- Winter Haven, United States (1984), on the occasion of the Water Ski World Cup performed on the Lago Arancio, in Sambuca di Sicilia, Italy. The two cities share an association with water skiing.

== Gallery ==
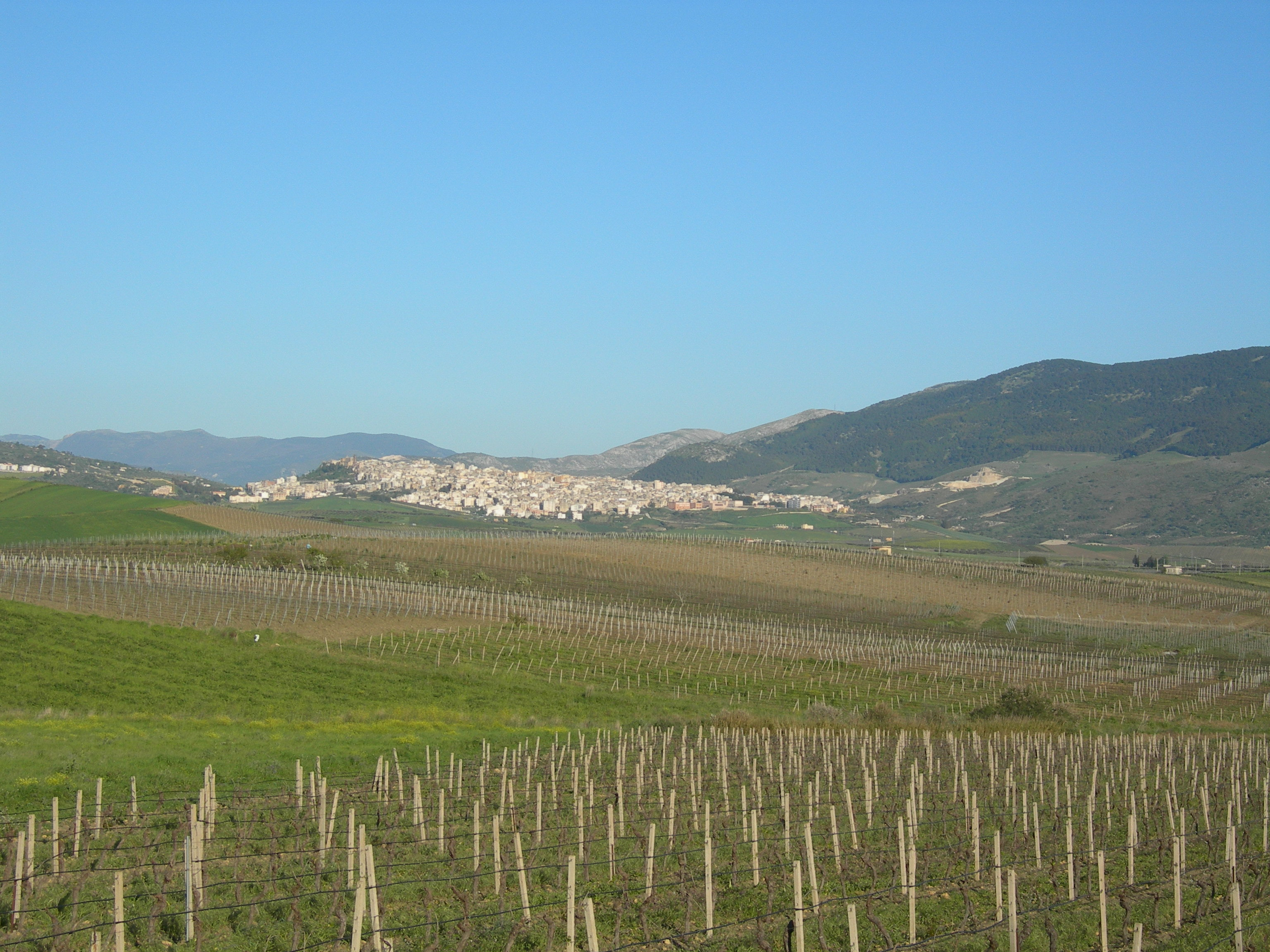
Sambuca di Sicilia

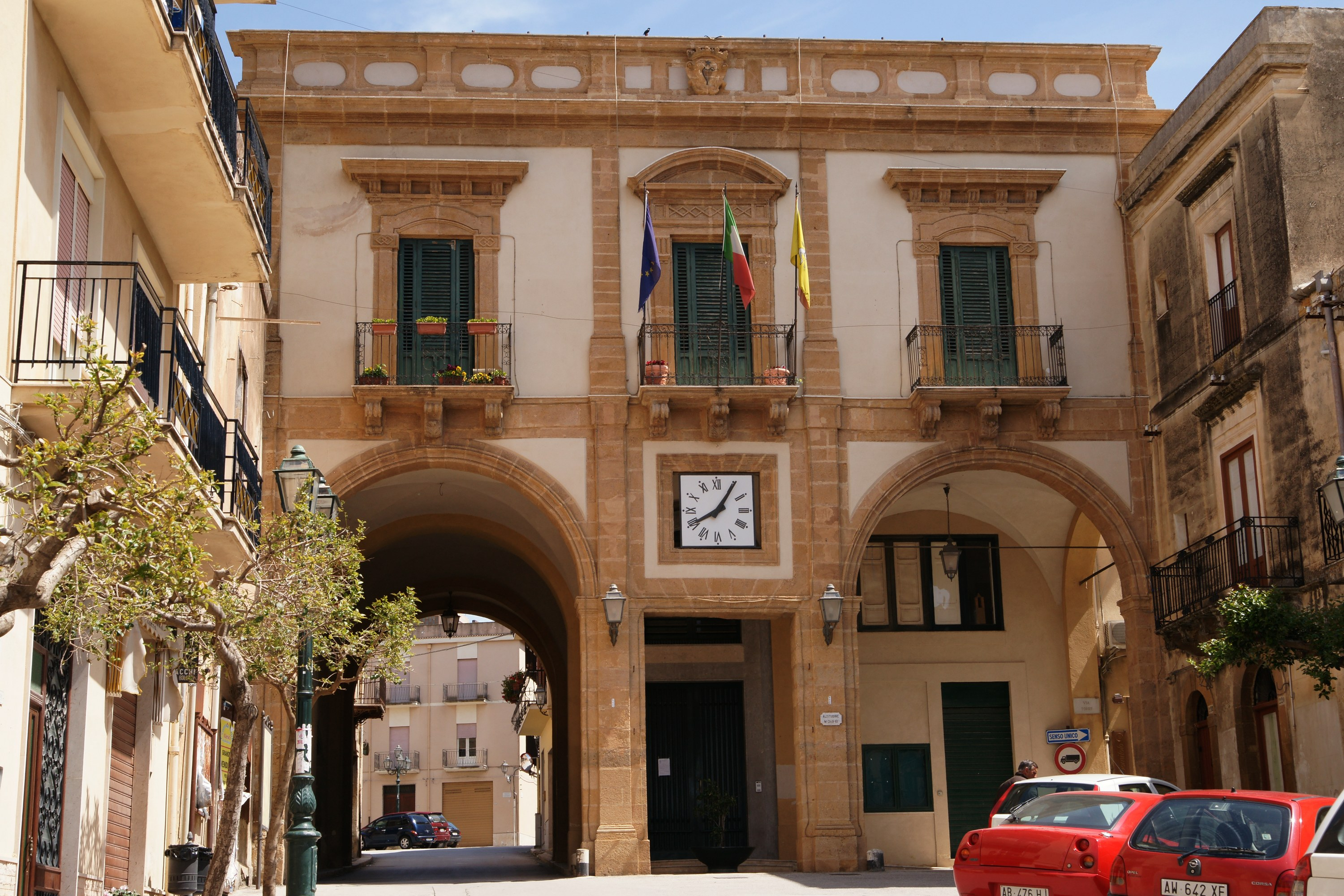
Palazzo dell'Arpa, town hall

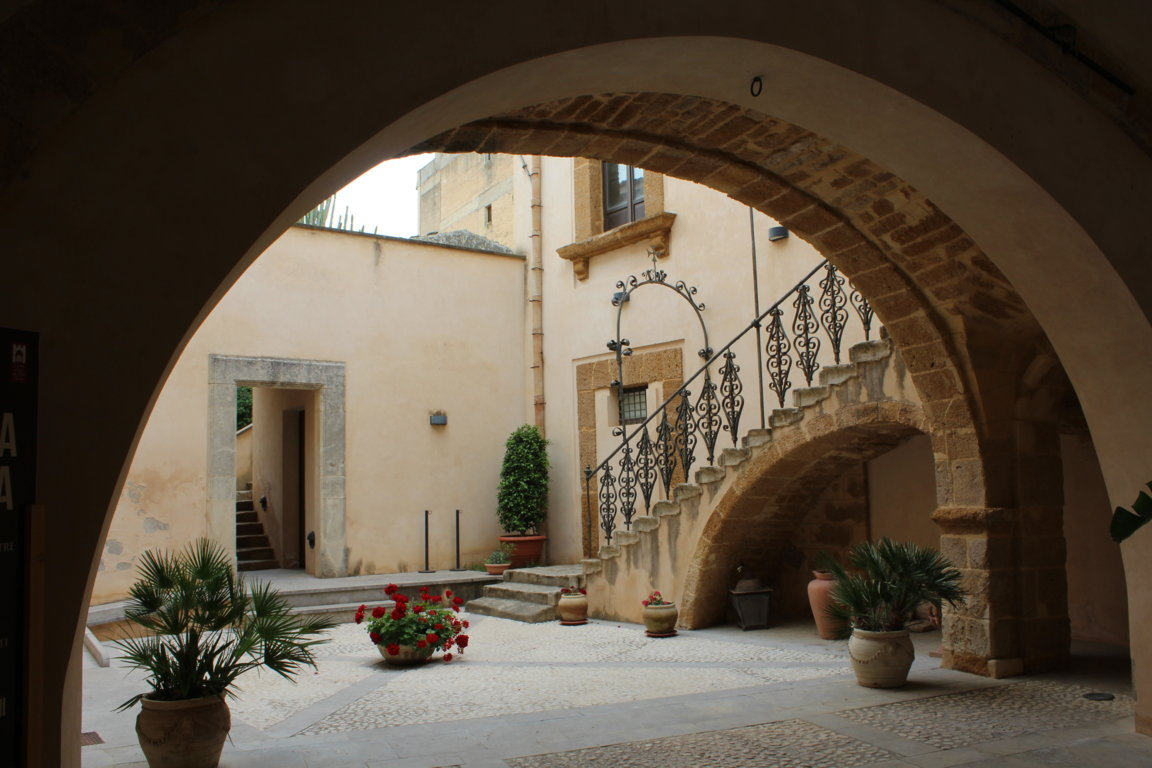
Palazzo Panitteri

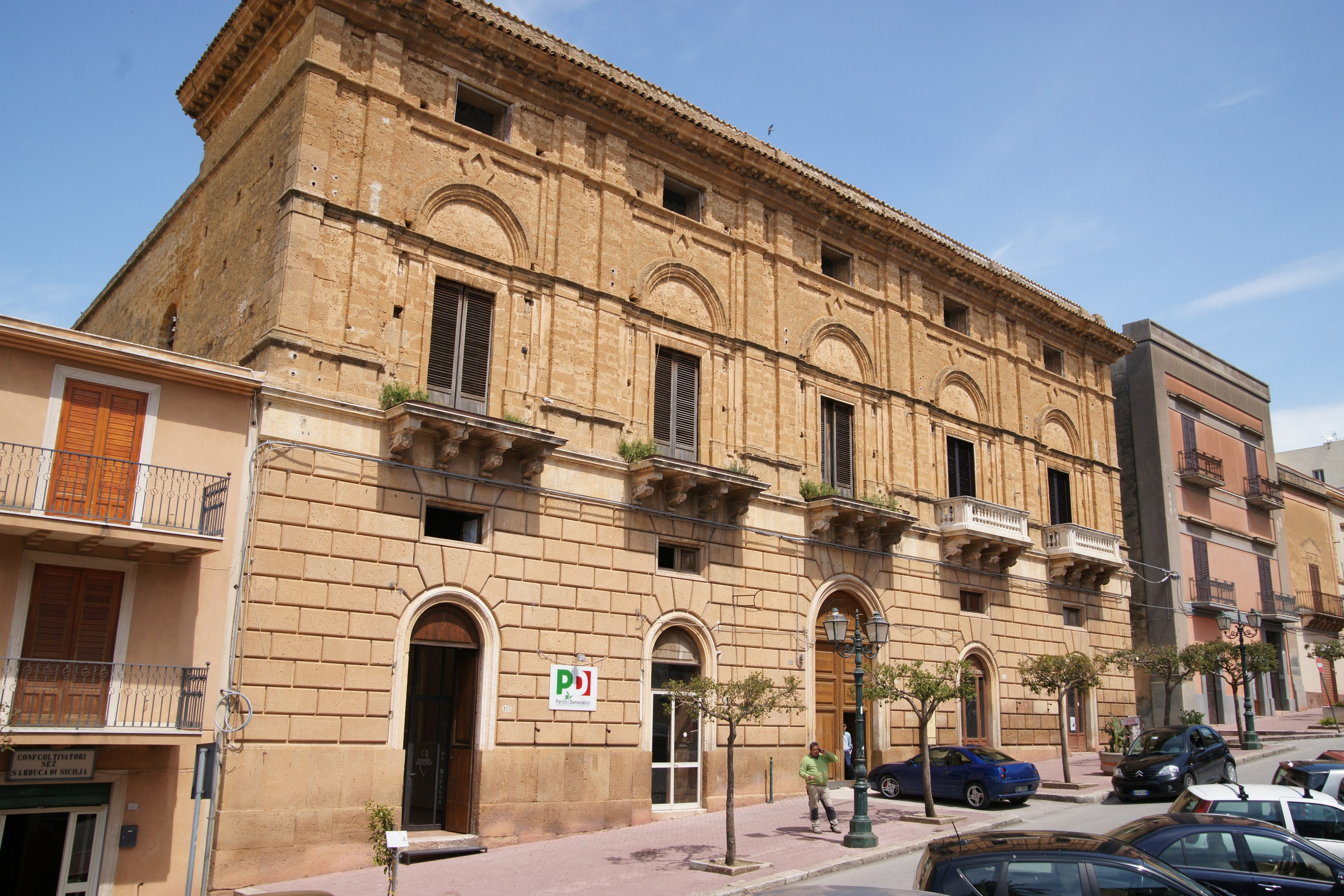
Palazzo Ciaccio

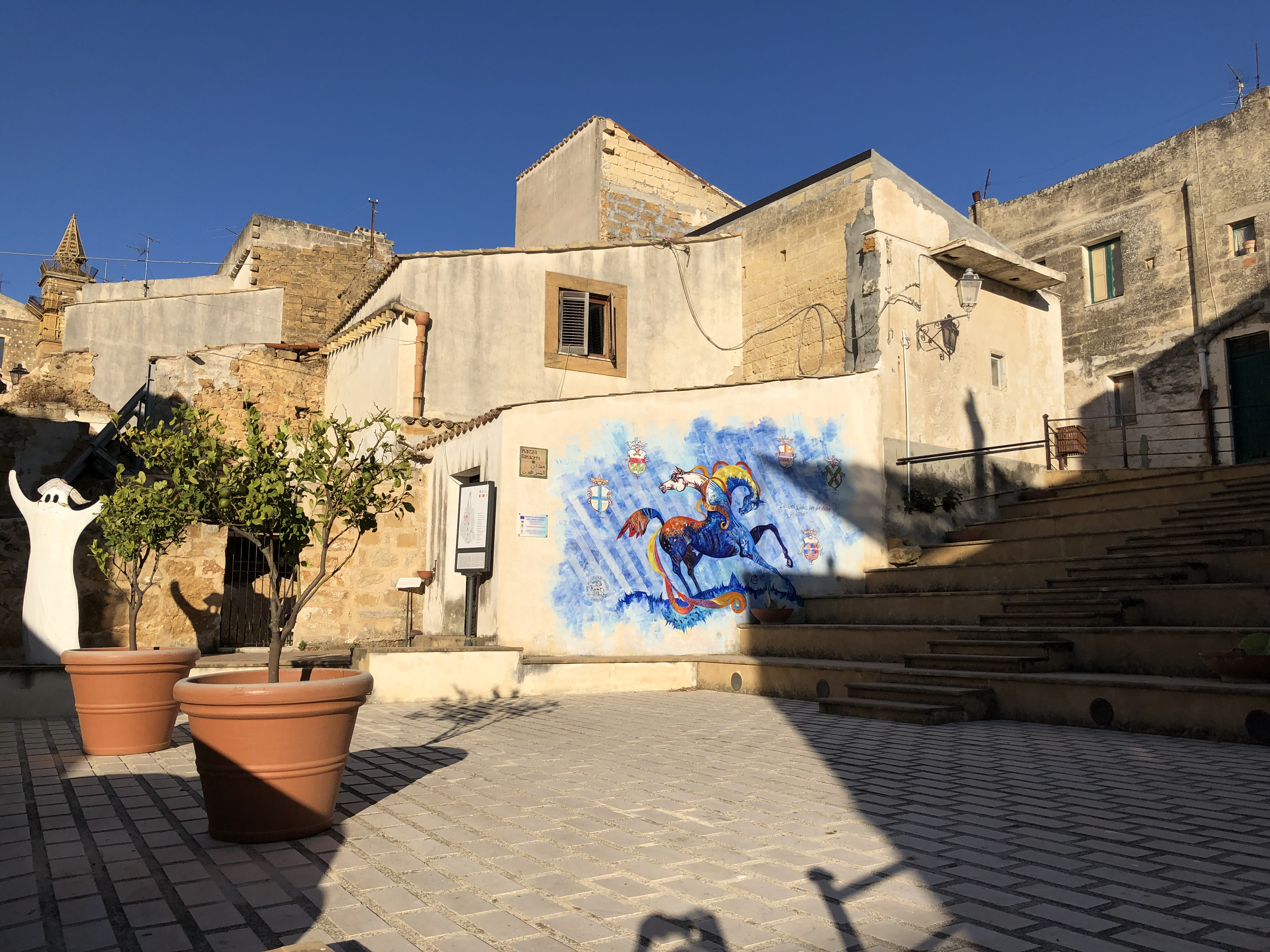
Piazza Saraceni

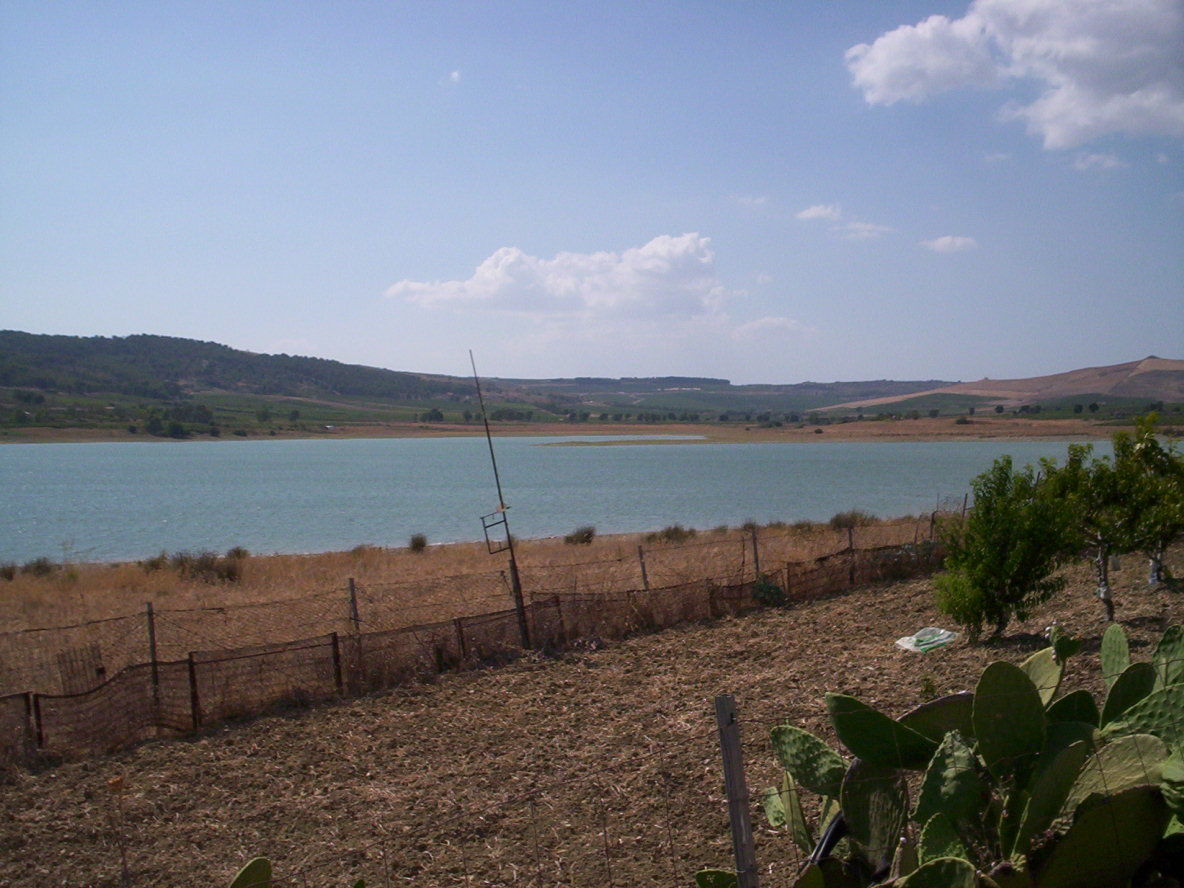
Lake Arancio

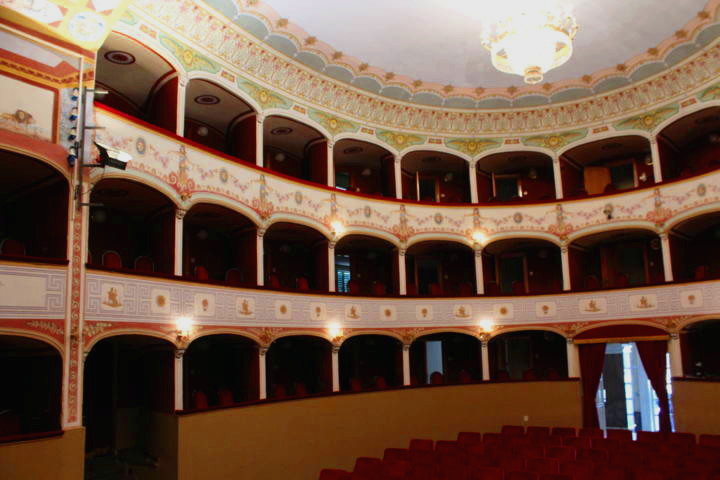
Theater L'Idea

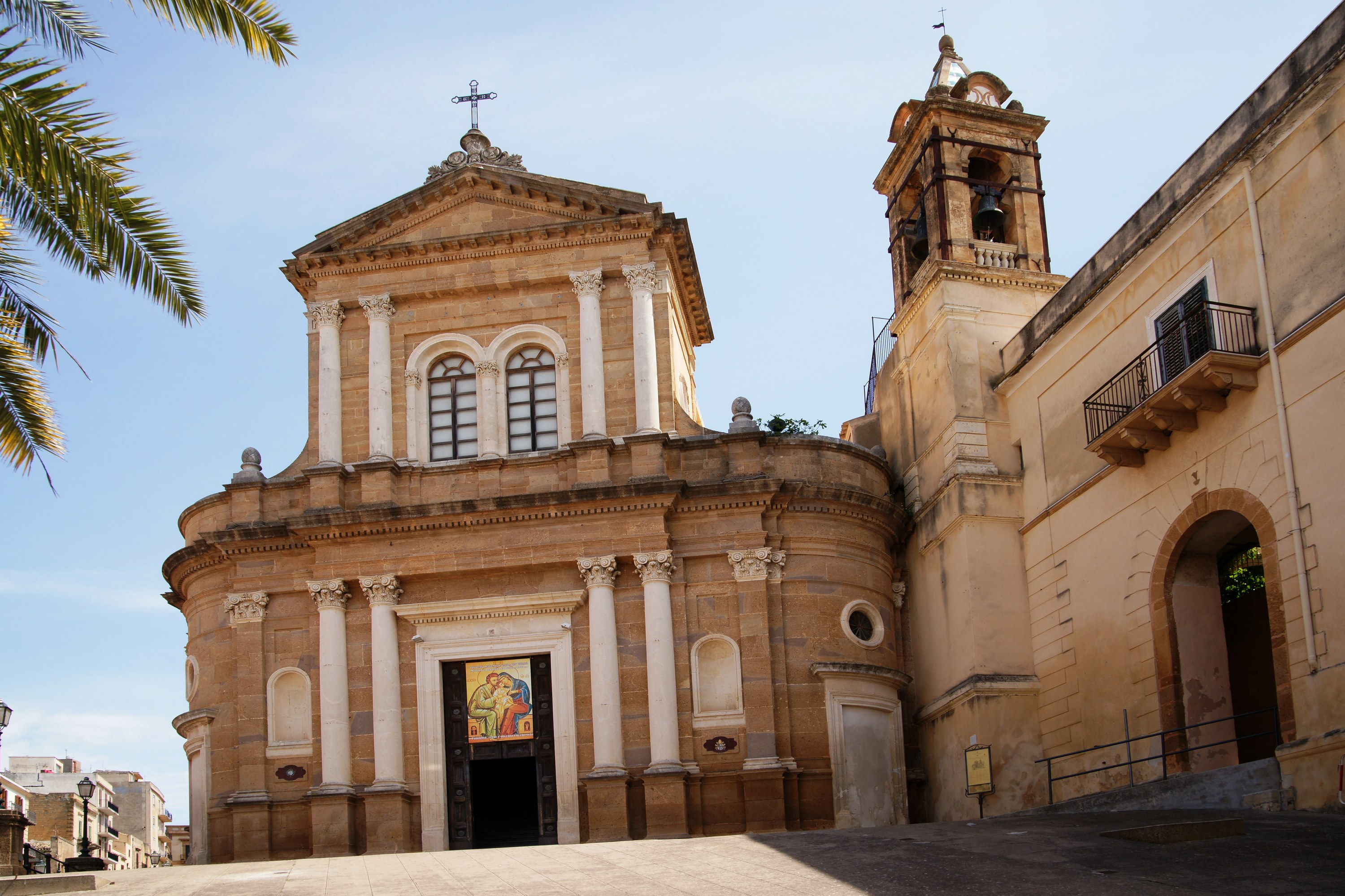
Santuario di Maria SS. dell'Udienza.

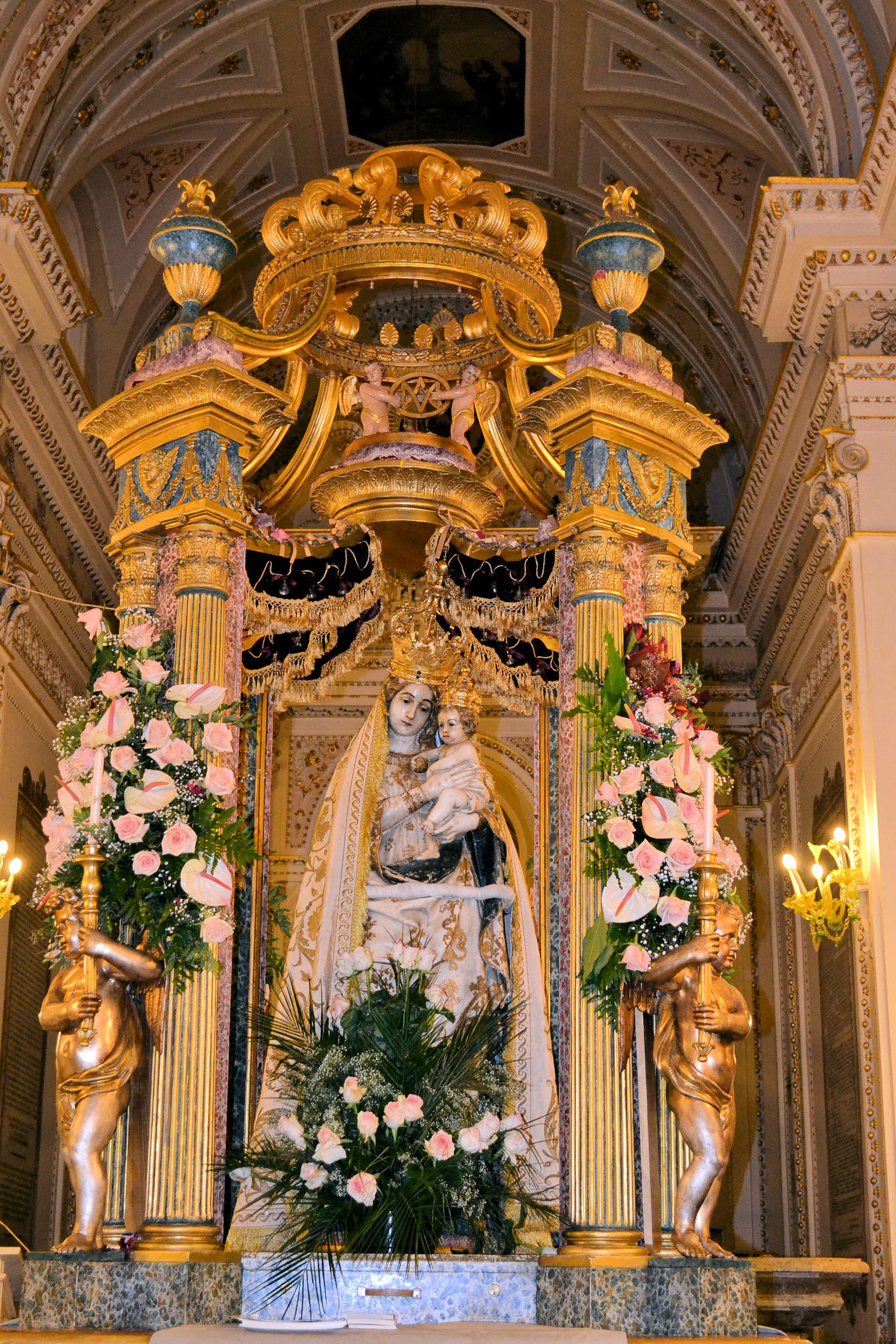
Antonello Gagini's statue, Our Lady of the Audience

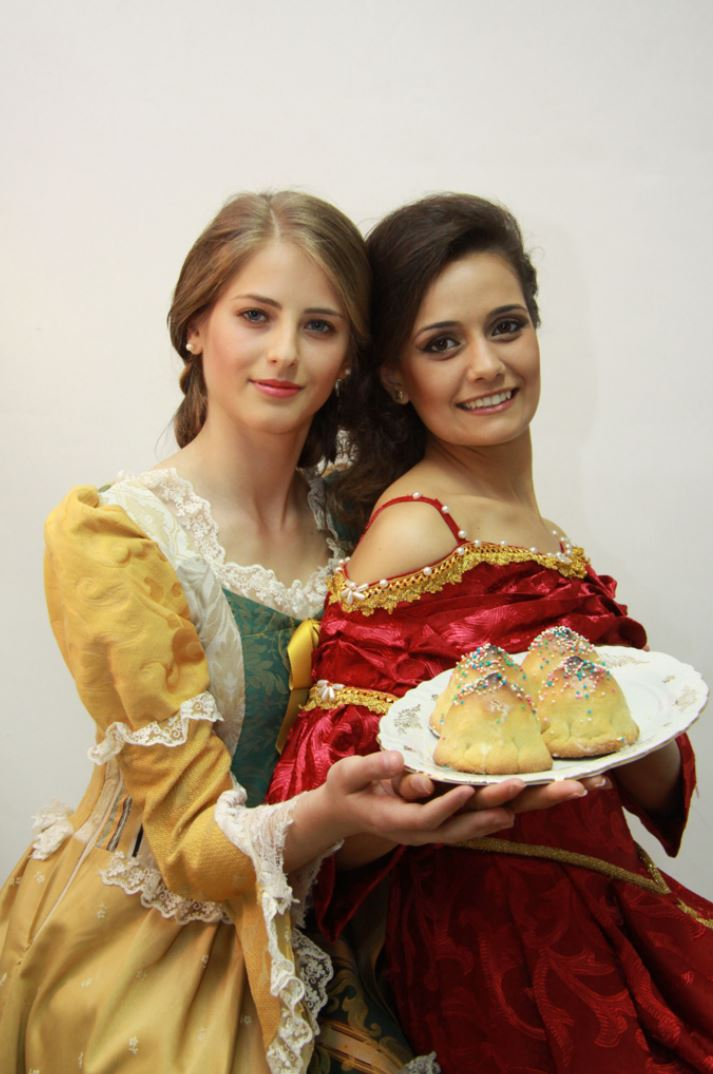
"Breast" Pastry, created by convent, displayed by models in period costume
