= Francesco Arancio =

Italian painter (1840–?)

Francesco Arancio (1844–?) was an Italian painter.

He was born in Palermo, where he first trained under Salvatore Lo Forte. In 1870, he won a bronze medal at the Exposition of Palermo for his painting of a large realistic portrait of a Garibaldino and similarly a bronze medal from Messina for a small canvas representing the choir of the Cathedral of Palermo; and an honorable mention at the Casino delle Arti in Palermo for a small canvas depicting a half-figure. He also completed many portraits of prominent families of Palermo. Among his works are:

- Interior of the Church of the Martorana.
- Madonna dell'Arco for the church of San Francesco da Paola in Palermo
- Madonna del Perpetuo Soccorso on gilded wood, for the church of Santi Pietro e Paolo in Palermo
- Sant'Antonio for the church of Sepolcro in Bagheria, near Palermo
- Choir of the Cathedral of Palermo
- La Pesca
- Studio dal vero
