= Lago Arancio =

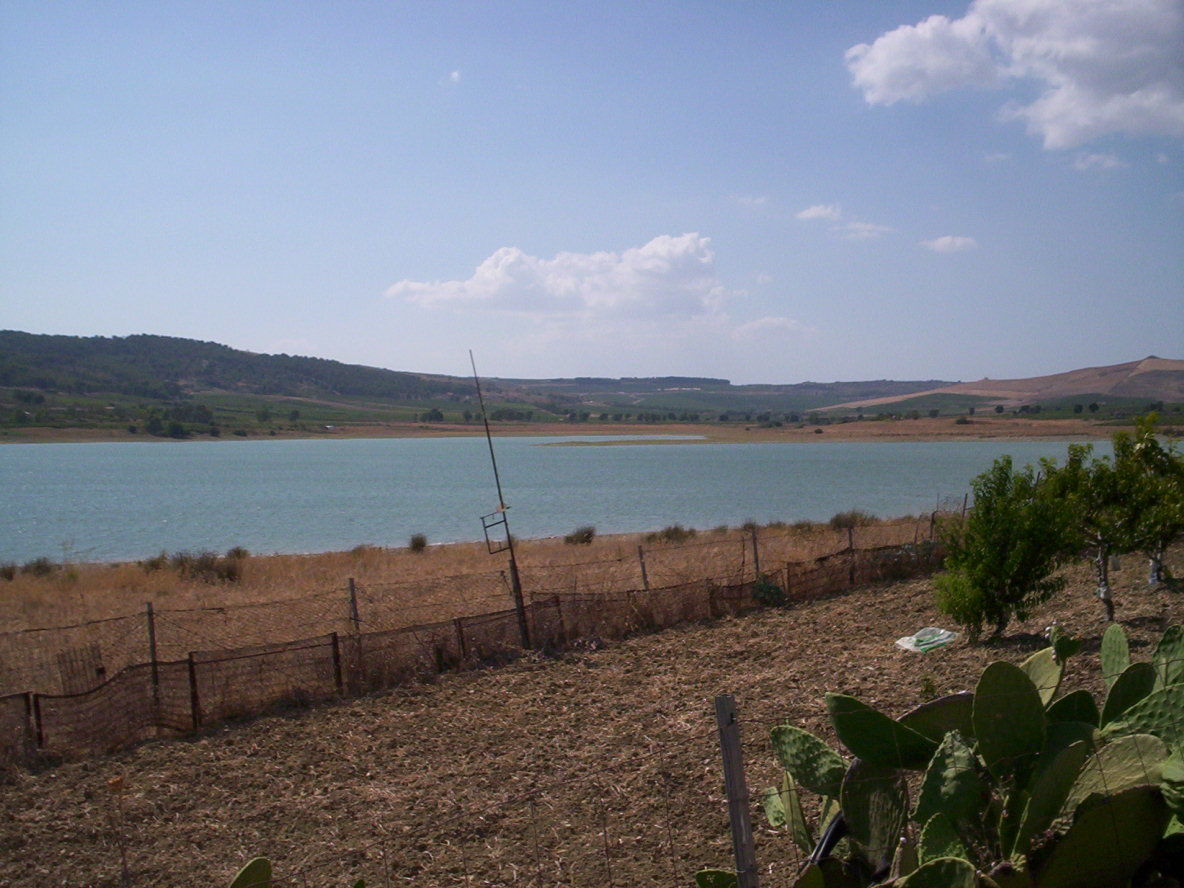

- Location within Sicily Location within Italy
- Location: Province of Agrigento, Sicily
- Coordinates: 37.6346°N 13.0624°E
- Type: reservoir
- Primary outflows: Carboj
- Catchment area: 205 km^{2} (79 sq mi)
- Basin countries: Italy
- Surface area: 3.7 km^{2} (1.4 sq mi)
- Average depth: 10.5 m (34 ft)
- Max. depth: 30.3 m (99 ft)
- Water volume: 38,800,000 m^{3} (1.37×10^{9} cu ft)
- Residence time: 2.2 years
- Surface elevation: 180 m (590 ft)

Lago Arancio (Italian for "orange tree lake") is a lake in the Province of Agrigento, Sicily, Italy. The reservoir is located on the territory of the municipalities of Sambuca di Sicilia, Santa Margherita di Belice and Sciacca. It was created in 1951, and has a surface area of 3.7 km^{2} and an average depth of 10.5m.

The ruins of the Fortino di Mazzallakkar are located near the lake, and are sometimes partially submerged by its waters.
