= September 15 =

September 15 this year in various calendars
- Tuesday, 15 September 2026
Akan	Nwonabene
Armenian	27 Hoṙi 1476
Aztec	Tititl 8, 2 Cōzcacuāuhtli
Babylonian	2 Ululu, 2337 SE
Balinese pawukon	Luang, Pepet, Beteng, Laba, Keliwon, Aryang, Anggara of Parangbakat, Indra, Tulus, Pati
Bengali	31 Bhadro, BS 1433
Chinese	Yang Water Dragon・Wings Mansion; Fire Horse Year, Month 8, Day 5 (Bailu, 8 days until Qiufen)
Common Era	15 September 2026 CE
Coptic	5 Thout, AM 1743
Egyptian	2 Mechir, 2775 NE
Ethiopian	5 Maskaram, 2019 Amätä Məhrät
French Republican	Décade III, Nonidi de Fructidor de l'Année 234 de la République
Gregorian	15 September, AD 2026
Hebrew	4 Tishrei, AM 5787
Hindu	Svātī・Indra; Solar: 30 Bhādrapada, 1948 SE; Lunisolar: Caturthī, Śukla pakṣa of Bhādrapada, 2083 VE; Rāudra・5127 KY・1,872,833
Icelandic	Þriðjudagur, 22 Tvímánuður 2026
Islamic	2 Rabi' al-thani, AH 1448 (using tabular method)
ISO week date	2026-W38-2
Japanese	5 Hazuki, Reiwa 8 (Hakuro, 8 days until Shūbun)
Julian	2 September, AD 2026 (AM 7534)
Julian day	2461299
Korean	5 Dakdal, 4359 DE
Maya	13.0.13.16.16; 9 Chen, 2 Cib
Roman	ante diem IV Nonas Septembres, MMDCCLXXIX AUC
Solar Hijri	24 Shahrivar, SH 1405
Tibetan	4 khrums, me pho rta 2153 or 1772 or 1000

<<	September					>>
Su	Mo	Tu	We	Th	Fr	Sa
		1	2	3	4	5
6	7	8	9	10	11	12
13	14	15	16	17	18	19
20	21	22	23	24	25	26
27	28	29	30
2026

September 15 in recent years
2026 (Tuesday)
2025 (Monday)
2024 (Sunday)
2023 (Friday)
2022 (Thursday)
2021 (Wednesday)
2020 (Tuesday)
2019 (Sunday)
2018 (Saturday)
2017 (Friday)

September 15 is the 258th day of the year (259th in leap years) in the Gregorian calendar; 107 days remain until the end of the year.

== Events ==
=== Pre-1600 ===
- 533 – The Byzantine army under Belisarius enters Carthage following their victory over the Vandals at Ad Decimum.
- 608 – Consecration of pope Boniface IV following his approval by the Byzantine emperor.
- 994 – Major Fatimid victory over the Byzantine Empire at the Battle of the Orontes.
- 1440 – Gilles de Rais, one of the earliest known serial killers, is taken into custody upon an accusation brought against him by Jean de Malestroit, Bishop of Nantes.
- 1530 – Appearance of the miraculous portrait of Saint Dominic in Soriano in Soriano Calabro, Calabria, Italy; commemorated as a feast day by the Roman Catholic Church 1644–1912.
- 1556 – Departing from Vlissingen, ex-Holy Roman Emperor Charles V returns to Spain.

=== 1601–1900 ===
- 1762 – Seven Years' War: Battle of Signal Hill.
- 1776 – American Revolutionary War: British forces successfully land at Kip's Bay, forcing the Continental Army, which was already withdrawing from New York City, to cede control of the lower half of Manhattan Island.
- 1789 – The United States "Department of Foreign Affairs", established by law in July, is renamed the Department of State and given a variety of domestic duties.
- 1794 – French Revolutionary Wars: Arthur Wellesley (later Duke of Wellington) sees his first combat at the Battle of Boxtel during the Flanders Campaign.
- 1795 – Britain seizes the Dutch Cape Colony in southern Africa to prevent its use by the Batavian Republic.
- 1812 – The Grande Armée under Napoleon reaches the Kremlin in Moscow during the failed French invasion of Russia.
- 1812 – War of 1812: A second supply train sent to relieve Fort Harrison is ambushed in the Attack at the Narrows.
- 1813 – Followers of the Eight Trigram Sect loyal to Lin Qing attack the Forbidden City in a failed attempt to oust the Jiaqing Emperor of the Qing dynasty.
- 1816 – HMS Whiting runs aground on the Doom Bar.
- 1820 – Constitutionalist revolution in Lisbon, Portugal.
- 1821 – The Captaincy General of Guatemala declares independence from Spain.
- 1830 – The Liverpool to Manchester railway line opens; British MP William Huskisson becomes the first widely reported railway passenger fatality when he is struck and killed by the locomotive Rocket.
- 1835 – HMS Beagle, with Charles Darwin aboard, reaches the Galápagos Islands. The ship lands at Chatham or San Cristobal, the easternmost of the archipelago.
- 1862 – American Civil War: Confederate forces capture Harpers Ferry, Virginia.
- 1873 – Franco-Prussian War: The last Imperial German Army troops leave France upon completion of payment of indemnity.
- 1894 – First Sino-Japanese War: Japan defeats the Qing dynasty in the Battle of Pyongyang, causing the Qing army to withdraw to the Chinese border with Korea.

=== 1901–present ===
- 1915 – New Culture Movement: Chen Duxiu establishes the New Youth magazine in Shanghai.
- 1916 – World War I: Tanks are used for the first time in battle, at the Battle of the Somme.
- 1918 – World War I: Allied troops break through the Bulgarian defenses on the Macedonian front.
- 1935 – Nazi Germany adopts a new national flag bearing the swastika.
- 1935 – Nazi Germany announces two new laws related to race and the rights of Jews. These became known as the Nuremberg Race Laws.
- 1940 – World War II: The climax of the Battle of Britain, when the Luftwaffe launches its largest and most concentrated attack of the entire campaign.
- 1942 – World War II: U.S. Navy aircraft carrier USS Wasp is sunk by Japanese torpedoes at Guadalcanal.
- 1944 – Franklin D. Roosevelt and Winston Churchill meet in Quebec as part of the Octagon Conference to discuss strategy.
- 1944 – World War II: The Battle of Peleliu begins as the United States Marine Corps' 1st Marine Division and the United States Army's 81st Infantry Division hit White and Orange beaches under heavy fire from Japanese infantry and artillery.
- 1945 – A hurricane strikes southern Florida and the Bahamas, destroying 366 airplanes and 25 blimps at Naval Air Station Richmond.
- 1947 – Typhoon Kathleen hits the Kantō region, in Japan killing around 1,000-2,000 people.
- 1948 – The Indian Army captures the towns of Jalna, Latur, Mominabad, Surriapet and Narkatpalli as part of Operation Polo.
- 1948 – The F-86 Sabre sets the world aircraft speed record at 671 miles per hour (1,080 km/h).
- 1950 – Korean War: The U.S. X Corps lands at Inchon.
- 1952 – The United Nations cedes Eritrea to Ethiopia.
- 1954 – Marilyn Monroe's iconic skirt scene is shot during filming for The Seven Year Itch.
- 1958 – A Central Railroad of New Jersey commuter train runs through an open drawbridge at the Newark Bay, killing 48.
- 1959 – Nikita Khrushchev becomes the first Soviet leader to visit the United States.
- 1962 – The Soviet ship Poltava heads toward Cuba, one of the events that sets into motion the Cuban Missile Crisis.
- 1963 – Baptist Church bombing: Four children are killed in the bombing of an African-American church in Birmingham, Alabama, United States.
- 1966 – U.S. President Lyndon B. Johnson, responding to a sniper attack at the University of Texas at Austin, writes a letter to Congress urging the enactment of gun control legislation.
- 1968 – The Soviet Zond 5 spaceship is launched, becoming the first spacecraft to fly around the Moon and re-enter the Earth's atmosphere.
- 1971 – The first Greenpeace ship departs from Vancouver to protest against the upcoming Cannikin nuclear weapon test in Alaska.
- 1972 – A Scandinavian Airlines System domestic flight from Gothenburg to Stockholm is hijacked and flown to Malmö Bulltofta Airport.
- 1974 – Air Vietnam Flight 706 is hijacked, then crashes while attempting to land with 75 on board.
- 1975 – The French department of "Corse" (the entire island of Corsica) is divided into two: Haute-Corse (Upper Corsica) and Corse-du-Sud (Southern Corsica).
- 1978 – At the Superdome in New Orleans, Muhammad Ali outpoints Leon Spinks in a rematch to become the first boxer to win the world heavyweight title three times.
- 1981 – The Senate Judiciary Committee unanimously approves Sandra Day O'Connor to become the first female justice of the Supreme Court of the United States.
- 1981 – The John Bull becomes the oldest operable steam locomotive in the world when the Smithsonian Institution operates it under its own power outside Washington, D.C.
- 1983 – Israeli premier Menachem Begin resigns.
- 1995 – Malaysia Airlines Flight 2133 crashes at Tawau Airport in Malaysia, killing 34.
- 2001 – During a CART race at the Lausitzring in Germany, former Formula One driver Alex Zanardi suffers a heavy accident resulting in him losing both his legs.
- 2004 – National Hockey League commissioner Gary Bettman announces lockout of the players' union and cessation of operations by the NHL head office.
- 2008 – Lehman Brothers files for Chapter 11 bankruptcy, the largest bankruptcy filing in U.S. history.
- 2011 – Four miners are killed in the Gleision Colliery mining accident in the Swansea Valley, Wales.
- 2017 – The Parsons Green bombing takes place in London.
- 2020 – Signing of the Bahrain–Israel normalization agreement occurs in Washington, D.C., normalizing relations between Israel and two Arab nations, the United Arab Emirates and Bahrain.

== Births ==
=== Pre-1600 ===
- 767 – Saichō, Japanese monk (died 822)
- 1254 – Marco Polo, Italian merchant and explorer (died 1324)
- 1461 – Jacopo Salviati, Italian politician (died 1533)
- 1505 – Mary of Hungary, Dutch ruler (died 1558)
- 1533 – Catherine of Austria, Queen of Poland (died 1572)
- 1580 – Charles Annibal Fabrot, French lawyer and author (died 1659)
- 1592 – Giovanni Battista Rinuccini, archbishop of Fermo (died 1653)

=== 1601–1900 ===
- 1613 – François de La Rochefoucauld, French soldier and author (died 1680)
- 1649 – Titus Oates, English minister, fabricated the Popish Plot (died 1705)
- 1666 – Sophia Dorothea of Celle (died 1726)
- 1690 – Ignazio Prota, Italian composer and educator (died 1748)
- 1715 – Jean-Baptiste Vaquette de Gribeauval, French general and engineer (died 1789)
- 1736 – Jean Sylvain Bailly, French astronomer, mathematician, and politician, 1st Mayor of Paris (died 1793)
- 1759 – Cornelio Saavedra, Argentinean general and politician (died 1829)
- 1760 – Bogislav Friedrich Emanuel von Tauentzien, Prussian general (died 1824)
- 1765 – Manuel Maria Barbosa du Bocage, Portuguese poet and author (died 1805)
- 1789 – James Fenimore Cooper, American novelist, short story writer, and historian (died 1851)
- 1795 – James Gates Percival, American poet, surgeon and geologist (died 1856)
- 1815 – Halfdan Kjerulf, Norwegian journalist and composer (died 1868)
- 1819 – Cyprien Tanguay, Canadian priest and historian (died 1902)
- 1828 – Alexander Butlerov, Russian chemist and academic (died 1886)
- 1830 – Porfirio Díaz, Mexican general and politician, 29th President of Mexico (died 1915)
- 1846 – George Franklin Grant, African-American educator, dentist, and inventor (died 1910)
- 1852 – Edward Bouchet, American physicist and educator (died 1918)
- 1852 – Jan Ernst Matzeliger, Surinamese-American inventor (died 1889)
- 1857 – William Howard Taft, American lawyer, jurist, and politician, 27th President of the United States (died 1930)
- 1857 – Anna Winlock, American astronomer and academic (died 1904)
- 1858 – Charles de Foucauld, French priest and martyr (died 1916)
- 1858 – Jenő Hubay, Hungarian violinist, composer, and educator (died 1937)
- 1861 – M. Visvesvaraya, Indian engineer, scholar, and Bharat Ratna Laureate, Diwan of the Mysore Kingdom (died 1962)
- 1863 – Horatio Parker, American organist, composer, and educator (died 1919)
- 1864 – Prince Sigismund of Prussia (died 1866)
- 1867 – Vladimir May-Mayevsky, Russian general (died 1920)
- 1876 – Bruno Walter, German-American pianist, composer, and conductor (died 1962)
- 1876 – Sarat Chandra Chattopadhyay, Bengali novelist (died 1938)
- 1877 – Jakob Ehrlich, Czech-Austrian politician (died 1938)
- 1877 – Yente Serdatzky, Lithuanian-American author and playwright (died 1962)
- 1879 – Joseph Lyons, Australian educator and politician, 10th Prime Minister of Australia (died 1939)
- 1881 – Ettore Bugatti, Italian-French businessman, founded Bugatti (died 1947)
- 1883 – Esteban Terradas i Illa, Spanish mathematician and engineer (died 1950)
- 1886 – Paul Lévy, French mathematician and theorist (died 1971)
- 1887 – Carlos Dávila, Chilean journalist and politician, President of Chile (died 1955)
- 1888 – Antonio Ascari, Italian race car driver (died 1925)
- 1889 – Robert Benchley, American humorist, newspaper columnist, and actor (died 1945)
- 1889 – Claude McKay, Jamaican-American poet and author (died 1948)
- 1890 – Ernest Bullock, English organist and composer (died 1979)
- 1890 – Sonja Branting-Westerståhl, Swedish lawyer (died 1981)
- 1890 – Agatha Christie, English crime novelist, short story writer, and playwright (died 1976)
- 1890 – Frank Martin, Swiss-Dutch pianist and composer (died 1974)
- 1892 – Silpa Bhirasri, Italian sculptor and educator (died 1962)
- 1894 – Chic Harley, American football player (died 1974)
- 1894 – Oskar Klein, Swedish physicist and academic (died 1977)
- 1894 – Jean Renoir, French actor, director, producer, and screenwriter (died 1979)
- 1895 – Magda Lupescu, mistress and later wife of King Carol II of Romania (died 1977)
- 1897 – Merle Curti, American historian and author (died 1997)
- 1898 – J. Slauerhoff, Dutch poet and author (died 1936)

=== 1901–present ===
- 1901 – Donald Bailey, English engineer, designed Bailey bridge (died 1985)
- 1903 – Roy Acuff, American singer-songwriter and fiddler (died 1992)
- 1904 – Umberto II of Italy (died 1983)
- 1904 – Sheilah Graham Westbrook, English-American actress, journalist, and author (died 1988)
- 1906 – Jacques Becker, French actor, director, and screenwriter (died 1960)
- 1906 – Walter E. Rollins, American songwriter (died 1973)
- 1907 – Gunnar Ekelöf, Swedish poet and author (died 1968)
- 1907 – Fay Wray, Canadian-American actress (died 2004)
- 1908 – Kid Sheik, American trumpet player (died 1996)
- 1908 – Penny Singleton, American actress and singer (died 2003)
- 1909 – C. N. Annadurai, Indian educator and politician, 7th Chief Minister of Tamil Nadu (died 1969)
- 1909 – Phil Arnold, American actor (died 1968)
- 1910 – Betty Neels, English nurse and author (died 2001)
- 1911 – Karsten Solheim, Norwegian-American businessman, founded PING (died 2000)
- 1911 – Luther Terry, American physician and academic, 9th Surgeon General of the United States (died 1985)
- 1913 – Henry Brant, Canadian-American composer and conductor (died 2008)
- 1913 – Bruno Hoffmann, German glass harp player (died 1991)
- 1913 – John N. Mitchell, American lawyer, and politician, 67th United States Attorney General (died 1988)
- 1913 – Johannes Steinhoff, German general and pilot (died 1994)
- 1914 – Creighton Abrams, American general (died 1974)
- 1914 – Adolfo Bioy Casares, Argentinian journalist and author (died 1999)
- 1914 – Orhan Kemal, Turkish author (died 1970)
- 1915 – Fawn M. Brodie, American historian and author (died 1981)
- 1916 – Margaret Lockwood, Pakistani-English actress (died 1990)
- 1916 – Frederick C. Weyand, American general (died 2010)
- 1917 – Hilde Gueden, Austrian soprano (died 1988)
- 1917 – Buddy Jeannette, American basketball player and coach (died 1998)
- 1918 – Alfred D. Chandler Jr., American historian and academic (died 2007)
- 1918 – Margot Loyola, Chilean singer-songwriter and guitarist (died 2015)
- 1918 – Nipsey Russell, American comedian and actor (died 2005)
- 1919 – Fausto Coppi, Italian cyclist and soldier (died 1960)
- 1919 – Heda Margolius Kovály, Czech author and translator (died 2010)
- 1920 – Kym Bonython, Australian racing driver, drummer, and radio host (died 2011)
- 1921 – Richard Gordon, English surgeon and author (died 2017)
- 1921 – Gene Roland, American pianist and composer (died 1982)
- 1922 – Bob Anderson, English fencer and choreographer (died 2012)
- 1922 – Jackie Cooper, American actor (died 2011)
- 1922 – Gaetano Cozzi, Italian historian and academic (died 2001)
- 1922 – Mary Soames, English author (died 2014)
- 1923 – Anton Heiller, Austrian organist, composer, and conductor (died 1979)
- 1924 – Lucebert, Dutch poet and painter (died 1994)
- 1924 – György Lázár, Hungarian politician, 50th Prime Minister of Hungary (died 2014)
- 1924 – Bobby Short, American singer and pianist (died 2005)
- 1925 – Stanley Chapman, English architect and author (died 2009)
- 1925 – Erika Köth, German soprano (died 1981)
- 1925 – Carlo Rambaldi, Italian special effects artist (died 2012)
- 1925 – Helle Virkner, Danish actress and singer (died 2009)
- 1926 – Shohei Imamura, Japanese director, producer, and screenwriter (died 2006)
- 1926 – Jean-Pierre Serre, French mathematician and academic
- 1926 – Henry Silva, American actor (died 2022)
- 1927 – Rudolf Anderson, pilot and commissioned officer in the United States Air Force (died 1962)
- 1927 – Norm Crosby, American comedian and actor (died 2020)
- 1928 – Cannonball Adderley, American saxophonist and bandleader (died 1975)
- 1929 – Eva Burrows, Australian 13th General of The Salvation Army (died 2015)
- 1929 – Murray Gell-Mann, American physicist and academic, Nobel Prize laureate (died 2019)
- 1929 – John Julius Norwich, English historian and author (died 2018)
- 1929 – Wilbur Snyder, American football player and wrestler (died 1991)
- 1929 – Mümtaz Soysal, Turkish academic and politician, 30th Turkish Minister of Foreign Affairs (died 2019)
- 1930 – Endel Lippmaa, Estonian physicist and academic (died 2015)
- 1931 – Brian Henderson, New Zealand-Australian journalist, actor, and producer (died 2021)
- 1932 – Neil Bartlett, English-American chemist and academic (died 2008)
- 1933 – Rafael Frühbeck de Burgos, Spanish conductor and composer (died 2014)
- 1933 – Jim Rodger, Scottish footballer (died 2024)
- 1935 – Dinkha IV, Iraqi patriarch (died 2015)
- 1936 – Ashley Cooper, Australian tennis player (died 2020)
- 1936 – Sara Henderson, Australian farmer and author (died 2005)
- 1937 – Joey Carew, Trinidadian cricketer (died 2011)
- 1937 – Fernando de la Rúa, Argentinian lawyer and politician, 51st President of Argentina (died 2019)
- 1937 – King Curtis Iaukea, American wrestler (died 2010)
- 1937 – Robert Lucas Jr., American economist and academic, Nobel Prize laureate (died 2023)
- 1937 – Pino Puglisi, Italian priest and martyr (died 1993)
- 1938 – Gaylord Perry, American baseball player and coach (died 2022)
- 1939 – Subramanian Swamy, Indian economist, academic, and politician, Indian Minister of Law and Justice
- 1939 – George Walden, English journalist and politician
- 1940 – Merlin Olsen, American football player, sportscaster, and actor (died 2010)
- 1941 – Flórián Albert, Hungarian footballer and manager (died 2011)
- 1941 – Signe Toly Anderson, American rock singer (died 2016)
- 1941 – Mirosław Hermaszewski, Polish general, pilot and cosmonaut (died 2022)
- 1941 – Yuriy Norshteyn, Russian animator, director, and screenwriter
- 1941 – Viktor Zubkov, Russian businessman and politician, 37th Prime Minister of Russia
- 1942 – Lee Dorman, American bass player (died 2012)
- 1942 – Philip Harris, Baron Harris of Peckham, English businessman and politician
- 1942 – Ksenia Milicevic, French painter and architect
- 1944 – Mauro Piacenza, Italian cardinal
- 1944 – Graham Taylor, English footballer and manager (died 2017)
- 1945 – Carmen Maura, Spanish actress
- 1945 – Jessye Norman, American soprano (died 2019)
- 1945 – Hans-Gert Pöttering, German lawyer and politician, 23rd President of the European Parliament
- 1945 – Ron Shelton, American director, producer, and screenwriter
- 1946 – Tommy Lee Jones, American actor, director, producer, and screenwriter
- 1946 – Mike Procter, South African cricketer, coach, and referee (died 2024)
- 1946 – Oliver Stone, American director, screenwriter, and producer
- 1947 – Russel L. Honoré, American general
- 1947 – Viggo Jensen, Danish footballer and manager
- 1947 – Diane E. Levin, American educator and author
- 1947 – Theodore Long, American wrestling referee and manager
- 1949 – Joe Barton, American lawyer and politician
- 1950 – Rajiv Malhotra, Indian author
- 1950 – Mirza Masroor Ahmad, Pakistani-English caliph and scholar
- 1951 – Johan Neeskens, Dutch footballer and manager (died 2024)
- 1951 – Fred Seibert, American television producer, co-founder of MTV
- 1952 – Richard Brodeur, Canadian ice hockey player and sportscaster
- 1952 – Paula Duncan, Australian actress
- 1952 – Ratnajeevan Hoole, Sri Lankan engineer and academic
- 1952 – Kelly Keagy, American singer and drummer
- 1953 – Margie Moran, Filipino peace advocate and beauty queen, Miss Universe 1973
- 1953 – Keiko Takeshita, Japanese actress
- 1954 – Adrian Adonis, American wrestler (died 1988)
- 1954 – Hrant Dink, Turkish journalist (died 2007)
- 1954 – Barry Shabaka Henley, American actor
- 1955 – Željka Antunović, Croatian politician, 9th Croatian Minister of Defence
- 1955 – Abdul Qadir, Pakistani cricketer (died 2019)
- 1955 – Bruce Reitherman, American voice actor, singer, cinematographer, and producer
- 1955 – Renzo Rosso, Italian fashion designer and businessman, co-founded Diesel Clothing
- 1956 – Ross J. Anderson, British academic and educator (died 2024)
- 1956 – Rick Garcia (activist), American LGBTQ rights activist
- 1956 – Maggie Reilly, Scottish singer-songwriter
- 1956 – Ned Rothenberg, American saxophonist, clarinet player, and composer
- 1958 – Joel Quenneville, Canadian ice hockey player and coach
- 1958 – Wendie Jo Sperber, American actress (died 2005)
- 1959 – Mark Kirk, American commander, lawyer, and politician
- 1960 – Ed Solomon, American director, producer, and screenwriter
- 1960 – Lisa Vanderpump, British restaurateur, television personality, and author
- 1961 – Terry Lamb, Australian rugby league player and coach
- 1961 – Helen Margetts, British political scientist
- 1961 – Dan Marino, American football player and sportscaster
- 1961 – Patrick Patterson, Jamaican cricketer
- 1962 – Amanda Wakeley, English fashion designer
- 1963 – Pete Myers, American basketball player and coach
- 1963 – Stephen C. Spiteri, Maltese military historian
- 1964 – Robert Fico, Slovak academic and politician, 14th Prime Minister of Slovakia
- 1964 – Steve Watkin, Welsh cricketer
- 1964 – Doyle Wolfgang von Frankenstein, American guitarist and songwriter
- 1966 – Wenn V. Deramas, Filipino director and screenwriter (died 2016)
- 1966 – Sherman Douglas, American basketball player
- 1967 – Paul Abbott, American baseball player and coach
- 1967 – Rodney Eyles, Australian squash player
- 1968 – Danny Nucci, American actor
- 1969 – Revaz Arveladze, Georgian footballer
- 1969 – Corby Davidson, American radio personality
- 1969 – Géraldine Carré, French journalist and television presenter (died 2024)
- 1969 – Allen Shellenberger, American drummer (died 2009)
- 1971 – Nathan Astle, New Zealand cricketer and coach
- 1971 – Josh Charles, American actor and director
- 1971 – Wayne Ferreira, South African tennis player
- 1972 – Jimmy Carr, English comedian, actor, producer, and screenwriter
- 1972 – Kit Chan, Singaporean singer-songwriter
- 1972 – Queen Letizia of Spain, Queen Consort of King Felipe VI of Spain
- 1973 – Prince Daniel, Duke of Västergötland, Swedish prince
- 1974 – Arata Iura, Japanese actor, model, and fashion designer
- 1975 – Tom Dolan, American swimmer
- 1975 – Martina Krupičková, Czech painter
- 1976 – Brett Kimmorley, Australian rugby league player and sportscaster
- 1977 – Chimamanda Ngozi Adichie, Nigerian author
- 1977 – Angela Aki, Japanese singer-songwriter
- 1977 – Sophie Dahl, English model and author
- 1977 – Tom Hardy, English actor, producer, and screenwriter
- 1977 – Marisa Ramirez, American actress
- 1977 – Jason Terry, American basketball player
- 1978 – Zach Filkins, American guitarist
- 1978 – Eiður Guðjohnsen, Icelandic footballer
- 1979 – Dave Annable, American actor
- 1979 – Amy Davidson, American actress
- 1979 – Patrick Marleau, Canadian ice hockey player
- 1979 – Carlos Ruiz, Guatemalan footballer
- 1979 – Reece Young, New Zealand cricketer
- 1980 – David Diehl, American football player and sportscaster
- 1980 – Mike Dunleavy Jr., American basketball player
- 1981 – Ben Schwartz, American actor, comedian and writer
- 1983 – Yuka Hirata, Japanese actress and model
- 1984 – Prince Harry, Duke of Sussex
- 1984 – Marshal Yanda, American football player
- 1986 – Jenna Marbles, American YouTuber and comedian
- 1986 – Heidi Montag, American reality television personality and singer
- 1987 – Vaila Barsley, Scottish footballer
- 1988 – Chelsea Kane, American actress and singer
- 1988 – Tim Moltzen, Australian rugby league player
- 1990 – Aaron Mooy, Australian footballer
- 1990 – Matt Shively, American actor
- 1990 – Megan Stalter, American actress and comedian
- 1991 – Lee Jung-shin, South Korean musician and actor
- 1991 – Phil Ofosu-Ayeh, German-Ghanaian footballer
- 1993 – Josh Richardson, American basketball player
- 1993 – Dennis Schröder, German basketball player
- 1995 – Rafael Santos Borré, Colombian footballer
- 1995 – Terry McLaurin, American football player
- 1995 – Joe Ofahengaue, New Zealand-Tongan rugby league player
- 1995 – David Raya, Spanish footballer
- 1997 – Quin Houff, American racing driver
- 1999 – Jaren Jackson Jr., American basketball player
- 2000 – Felix, Australian singer based in South Korea, member of Stray Kids
- 2005 – Annaliese Dragan, Romanian-American rhythmic gymnast

== Deaths ==
=== Pre-1600 ===
- 921 – Ludmila of Bohemia, Czech martyr and saint (born 860)
- 1140 – Adelaide of Hungary, Duchess of Bohemia
- 1146 – Alan, 1st Earl of Richmond, English soldier (born 1100)
- 1231 – Louis I, Duke of Bavaria (born 1173)
- 1326 – Dmitry of Tver (born 1299)
- 1352 – Ewostatewos, Ethiopian monk and saint (born 1273)
- 1397 – Adam Easton, English cardinal
- 1408 – Edmund Holland, 4th Earl of Kent, English politician (born 1384)
- 1496 – Hugh Clopton, Lord Mayor of London (born c. 1440)
- 1500 – John Morton, English cardinal and academic (born 1420)
- 1504 – Elisabeth of Bavaria, Electress of the Palatinate (born 1478)
- 1510 – Saint Catherine of Genoa (born 1447)
- 1559 – Isabella Jagiellon, Queen of Hungary (born 1519)
- 1595 – John MacMorran, Baillie of Edinburgh, shot by rioting high school schoolchildren.
- 1596 – Leonhard Rauwolf, German physician and botanist (born 1535)

=== 1601–1900 ===
- 1613 – Thomas Overbury, English poet and author (born 1581)
- 1643 – Richard Boyle, 1st Earl of Cork, English-Irish politician, Lord High Treasurer of Ireland (born 1566)
- 1649 – John Floyd, English priest and educator (born 1572)
- 1700 – André Le Nôtre, French gardener (born 1613)
- 1701 – Edmé Boursault, French author and playwright (born 1638)
- 1707 – George Stepney, English poet and diplomat (born 1663)
- 1712 – Sidney Godolphin, 1st Earl of Godolphin, English politician, Lord High Treasurer (born 1645)
- 1750 – Charles Theodore Pachelbel, German organist and composer (born 1690)
- 1794 – Abraham Clark, American police officer and politician (born 1725)
- 1803 – Gian Francesco Albani, Italian cardinal (born 1719)
- 1813 – Antoine Étienne de Tousard, French general and engineer (born 1752)
- 1830 – François Baillairgé, Canadian painter and sculptor (born 1759)
- 1830 – William Huskisson, English financier and politician, Secretary of State for War and the Colonies (born 1770)
- 1841 – Alessandro Rolla, Italian violinist and composer (born 1757)
- 1842 – Pierre Baillot, French violinist and composer (born 1771)
- 1842 – Francisco Morazán, Guatemalan general, lawyer, and politician, President of Central American Federation (born 1792)
- 1852 – Johann Karl Simon Morgenstern, German-Estonian philologist and academic (born 1770)
- 1859 – Isambard Kingdom Brunel, English architect and engineer, designed the Great Western Railway (born 1806)
- 1864 – John Hanning Speke, English soldier and explorer (born 1827)
- 1874 – Charles-Amédée Kohler, Swiss chocolatier (born 1790)
- 1883 – Joseph Plateau, Belgian physicist and academic (born 1801)
- 1893 – Thomas Hawksley, English engineer (born 1807)

=== 1901–present ===
- 1907 – William Wales, English-American inventor (born c. 1838)
- 1915 – Ernest Gagnon, Canadian organist and composer (born 1834)
- 1921 – Roman von Ungern-Sternberg, Austrian-Russian general (born 1886)
- 1926 – Rudolf Christoph Eucken, German philosopher and academic, Nobel Prize laureate (born 1846)
- 1930 – Milton Sills, American actor and screenwriter (born 1882)
- 1938 – Thomas Wolfe, American novelist (born 1900)
- 1940 – William B. Bankhead, American lawyer and politician, 47th Speaker of the United States House of Representatives (born 1874)
- 1945 – André Tardieu, French journalist and politician, 97th Prime Minister of France (born 1876)
- 1945 – Anton Webern, Austrian composer and conductor (born 1883)
- 1945 – Linnie Marsh Wolfe, American librarian and author (born 1881)
- 1952 – Hugo Raudsepp, Estonian author and playwright (born 1883)
- 1965 – Steve Brown, American bassist (born 1890)
- 1972 – Ulvi Cemal Erkin, Turkish composer and educator (born 1906)
- 1972 – Baki Süha Ediboğlu, Turkish poet and author (born 1915)
- 1972 – Geoffrey Fisher, English archbishop and academic (born 1887)
- 1973 – Gustaf VI Adolf of Sweden (born 1882)
- 1975 – Franco Bordoni, Italian race car driver and pilot (born 1913)
- 1978 – Robert Cliche, Canadian lawyer, judge, and politician (born 1921)
- 1978 – Edmund Crispin, English writer and composer (born 1921)
- 1978 – Willy Messerschmitt, German engineer and academic, designed the Messerschmitt Bf 109 (born 1898)
- 1980 – Bill Evans, American pianist and composer (born 1929)
- 1981 – Rafael Méndez, Mexican trumpet player and composer (born 1906)
- 1983 – Prince Far I, Jamaican DJ and producer (born 1944)
- 1985 – Cootie Williams, American trumpet player (born 1910)
- 1989 – Jan DeGaetani, American soprano (born 1933)
- 1989 – Olga Erteszek, Polish-American fashion designer (born 1916)
- 1989 – Robert Penn Warren, American novelist, poet, and literary critic (born 1905)
- 1991 – John Hoyt, American actor (born 1904)
- 1991 – Warner Troyer, Canadian journalist and author (born 1932)
- 1993 – Pino Puglisi, Italian priest and martyr (born 1937)
- 1995 – Harry Calder, South African cricketer (born 1901)
- 1995 – Gunnar Nordahl, Swedish footballer and manager (born 1921)
- 1997 – Bulldog Brower, American wrestler (born 1933)
- 1998 – Louis Rasminsky, Canadian economist, 3rd Governor of the Bank of Canada (born 1908)
- 2001 – June Salter, Australian actress and author (born 1932)
- 2003 – Garner Ted Armstrong, American evangelist and author (born 1930)
- 2004 – Johnny Ramone, American guitarist and songwriter (born 1948)
- 2004 – Walter Stewart, Canadian journalist and author (born 1931)
- 2005 – Guy Green, English director and cinematographer (born 1913)
- 2005 – Sidney Luft, American manager and producer (born 1915)
- 2006 – Raymond Baxter, English television host and author (born 1922)
- 2006 – Oriana Fallaci, Italian journalist and author (born 1929)
- 2006 – Pablo Santos, Mexican-American actor (born 1987)
- 2007 – Colin McRae, Scottish race car driver (born 1968)
- 2007 – Jeremy Moore, English general (born 1928)
- 2007 – Aldemaro Romero, Venezuelan pianist, composer, and conductor (born 1928)
- 2007 – Brett Somers, Canadian-American actress and singer (born 1924)
- 2008 – Richard Wright, English singer-songwriter and keyboard player (born 1943)
- 2009 – Troy Kennedy Martin, Scottish-English screenwriter (born 1932)
- 2010 – Arrow, Caribbean singer-songwriter (born 1949)
- 2011 – Frances Bay, Canadian-American actress (born 1919)
- 2012 – Tibor Antalpéter, Hungarian volleyball player and diplomat, Ambassador of Hungary to the United Kingdom (born 1930)
- 2012 – Nevin Spence, Northern Irish rugby player (born 1990)
- 2012 – Hajra Masroor, Pakistani writer (born 1930)
- 2013 – Habib Munzir Al-Musawa, Indonesian cleric and scholar (born 1973)
- 2013 – Jerry G. Bishop, American radio and television host (born 1936)
- 2013 – Gerard Cafesjian, American businessman and philanthropist (born 1925)
- 2013 – Jackie Lomax, English singer-songwriter and guitarist (born 1944)
- 2014 – John Anderson Jr., American lawyer and politician, 36th Governor of Kansas (born 1917)
- 2014 – Eugene I. Gordon, American physicist and engineer (born 1930)
- 2014 – Nicholas Romanov, Prince of Russia (born 1922)
- 2014 – Jürg Schubiger, Swiss psychotherapist and author (born 1936)
- 2014 – Wayne Tefs, Canadian anthologist, author, and critic (born 1947)
- 2015 – Harry J. Lipkin, Israeli physicist and academic (born 1921)
- 2015 – Meir Pa'il, Israeli commander, historian, and politician (born 1926)
- 2015 – Bernard Van de Kerckhove, Belgian cyclist (born 1941)
- 2017 – Harry Dean Stanton, American actor (born 1926)
- 2018 – Helen Clare, British singer (born 1916)
- 2019 – Ric Ocasek, American musician (born 1944)
- 2021 – Lou Angotti, Canadian ice hockey player and coach (born 1938)
- 2023 – Fernando Botero, Colombian painter and sculptor (born 1932)
- 2024 – Tito Jackson, American singer-songwriter and guitarist (born 1953)
- 2024 – Elias Khoury, Lebanese intellectual, playwright and novelist (born 1948)
- 2026 – Jodie Allen, American journalist, author, and editor (born 1938)
- 2026 – Annie Dillard, American novelist, essayist, and poet (born 1945)
- 2026 – Gerrit Graham, American stage, television and film actor (born 1948)
- 2026 – Bonnie Greer, American-English playwright and critic (born 1948)
- 2026 – Dakila Cua, Filipino politician (born 1977)

== Holidays and observances ==
- Battle of Britain Day (United Kingdom)
- Christian feast day:
  - Joseph Abibos
  - Alpinus (Albinus) of Lyon
  - Aprus (Èvre) of Toul
  - Blessed Camillus Costanzo
  - Catherine of Genoa
  - James Chisholm (Episcopal Church)
  - Saint Dominic in Soriano (formerly)
  - Mamilian of Palermo
  - Mirin
  - Nicetas the Goth
  - Nicomedes
  - Our Lady of Sorrows
  - September 15 (Eastern Orthodox liturgics)
- Cry of Dolores, celebrated on the eve of Independence Day (Mexico).
- International Day of Democracy
- The beginning of German American Heritage Month, celebrated until October 15
- The beginning of National Hispanic Heritage Month, celebrated until October 15 (United States)
- World Lymphoma Awareness Day (International)
