= February 4 =

February 4 this year in various calendars
- Wednesday, 4 February 2026
Other calendars
Akan	Fowukuo
Armenian	19 Mehekani 1475
Aztec	Etzalcualiztli 5, 13 Ācatl
Babylonian	15 Tebetu, 2336 SE
Balinese pawukon	Menga, Pasah, Sri, Paing, Tungleh, Buda of Uye, Ludra, Nohan, Manusa
Bengali	21 Magh, BS 1432
Chinese	Yin Earth Rooster・Chariot Mansion; 17 Làyuè, Yǐsìnián (Lichun, 14 days until Yushui)
Common Era	4 February 2026 CE
Coptic	27 Tobi, AM 1742
Egyptian	24 Payni, 2774 NE
Ethiopian	27 Ṭer, 2018 Amätä Məhrät
French Republican	Décade II, Sextidi de Pluviôse de l'Année 234 de la République
Gregorian	4 February, AD 2026
Hebrew	17 Shevat, AM 5786
Hindu	Pūrvaphalgunī・Śobhana; Solar: 22 Māgha, 1947 SE; Lunisolar: Tr̥tīyā, Kṛishna pakṣa of Māgha, 2082 VE; Siddhārthin・5126 KY・1,872,610
Icelandic	Miðvikudagur, 13 Þorri 2025
Islamic	16 Sha'aban, AH 1447 (using tabular method)
ISO week date	2026-W06-3
Japanese	17 Shiwasu, Reiwa 8 (Risshun, 15 days until Usui)
Julian	22 January, AD 2026 (AM 7534)
Julian day	2461076
Maya	13.0.13.5.13; 11 Pax, 13 Ben
Roman	ante diem XI Kalendas Februarias, MMDCCLXXIX AUC
Solar Hijri	15 Bahman, SH 1404
Tibetan	18 rgyal, shing mo sbrul 2152 or 1771 or 999

<<	February					>>
Su	Mo	Tu	We	Th	Fr	Sa
1	2	3	4	5	6	7
8	9	10	11	12	13	14
15	16	17	18	19	20	21
22	23	24	25	26	27	28
2026

February 4 in recent years
2026 (Wednesday)
2025 (Tuesday)
2024 (Sunday)
2023 (Saturday)
2022 (Friday)
2021 (Thursday)
2020 (Tuesday)
2019 (Monday)
2018 (Sunday)
2017 (Saturday)

February 4 is the 35th day of the year in the Gregorian calendar; 330 days remain until the end of the year (331 in leap years).

== Events ==
=== Pre–1600 ===
- 211 – Following the death of the Roman Emperor Septimius Severus at Eboracum (modern York, England) while preparing to lead a campaign against the Caledonians, the empire is left in the control of his two quarrelling sons, Caracalla and Geta, whom he had instructed to make peace.
- 960 – Zhao Kuangyin declares himself Emperor Taizu of Song, ending the Later Zhou and beginning the Song dynasty.
- 1169 – A strong earthquake strikes the Ionian coast of Sicily, causing tens of thousands of injuries and deaths, especially in Catania.
- 1454 – Thirteen Years' War: The Secret Council of the Prussian Confederation sends a formal act of disobedience to the Grand Master of the Teutonic Knights, sparking the Thirteen Years' War.
- 1555 – John Rogers is burned at the stake, becoming the first English Protestant martyr under Queen Mary I.

=== 1601–1900 ===
- 1703 – In Edo (now Tokyo), all but one of the Forty-seven Ronin commit seppuku (ritual suicide) as recompense for avenging their master's death.
- 1758 – The city of Macapá in Brazil is founded by Sebastião Veiga Cabral.
- 1789 – George Washington is unanimously elected as the first President of the United States by the U.S. Electoral College.
- 1794 – The French legislature abolishes slavery throughout all territories of the French First Republic. It would be reestablished in the French West Indies in 1802.
- 1797 – The Riobamba earthquake strikes Ecuador, causing up to 40,000 casualties.
- 1801 – John Marshall is sworn in as Chief Justice of the United States.
- 1810 – Napoleonic Wars: Britain seizes Guadeloupe.
- 1820 – The Chilean Navy under the command of Lord Cochrane completes the two-day long Capture of Valdivia with just 300 men and two ships.
- 1825 – The Ohio Legislature authorizes the construction of the Ohio and Erie Canal and the Miami and Erie Canal.
- 1846 – The first Mormon pioneers make their exodus from Nauvoo, Illinois, westward towards Salt Lake Valley.
- 1859 – The Codex Sinaiticus is discovered in Egypt.
- 1861 – American Civil War: In Montgomery, Alabama, delegates from six breakaway U.S. states meet and initiate the process that would form the Confederate States of America on February 8.
- 1899 – The Philippine–American War begins when four Filipino soldiers enter the "American Zone" in Manila, igniting the Battle of Manila.

=== 1901–present ===
- 1932 – Second Sino-Japanese War: Harbin, Manchuria, falls to Japan.
- 1938 – Adolf Hitler appoints himself as head of the Armed Forces High Command.
- 1941 – The United Service Organization (USO) is created to entertain American troops.
- 1945 – World War II: Santo Tomas Internment Camp is liberated from Japanese authority.
- 1945 – World War II: The Yalta Conference between the "Big Three" (Churchill, Roosevelt, and Stalin) opens at the Livadia Palace in the Crimea.
- 1945 – World War II: The British Indian Army and Imperial Japanese Army begin a series of battles known as the Battle of Pokoku and Irrawaddy River operations.
- 1948 – Ceylon (later renamed Sri Lanka) becomes independent within the British Commonwealth.
- 1961 – The Angolan War of Independence and the greater Portuguese Colonial War begin.
- 1966 – All Nippon Airways Flight 60 plunges into Tokyo Bay, killing 133.
- 1967 – Lunar Orbiter program: Lunar Orbiter 3 lifts off from Cape Canaveral's Launch Complex 13 on its mission to identify possible landing sites for the Surveyor and Apollo spacecraft.
- 1974 – The Symbionese Liberation Army kidnaps Patty Hearst in Berkeley, California.
- 1974 – M62 coach bombing: The Provisional Irish Republican Army (IRA) explodes a bomb on a bus carrying off-duty British Armed Forces personnel in Yorkshire, England. Nine soldiers and three civilians are killed.
- 1975 – Haicheng earthquake (magnitude 7.3 on the Richter scale) occurs in Haicheng, Liaoning, China.
- 1976 – In Guatemala and Honduras an earthquake kills more than 22,000.
- 1977 – A Chicago Transit Authority elevated train rear-ends another and derails, killing 11 and injuring 180, the worst accident in the agency's history.
- 1992 – A coup d'état is led by Hugo Chávez against Venezuelan President Carlos Andrés Pérez.
- 1997 – En route to Lebanon, two Israeli Sikorsky CH-53 troop-transport helicopters collide in mid-air over northern Galilee, Israel, killing 73.
- 1997 – The Bojnurd earthquake measuring M_{w} 6.5 strikes Iran. With a Mercalli intensity of VIII, it kills at least 88 and damages 173 villages.
- 1998 – The 5.9 M_{w} Afghanistan earthquake shakes the Takhar Province with a maximum Mercalli intensity of VII (Very strong). With 2,323 killed, and 818 injured, damage is considered extreme.
- 1999 – Unarmed West African immigrant Amadou Diallo is shot 19 times by four plainclothes New York City police officers on an unrelated stake-out, inflaming race relations in the city.
- 2000 – The World Summit Against Cancer for the New Millennium, Charter of Paris is signed by the President of France, Jacques Chirac and the Director General of UNESCO, Koichiro Matsuura, initiating World Cancer Day which is held on February 4 every year.
- 2003 – The Federal Republic of Yugoslavia adopts a new constitution, becoming a loose confederacy between Montenegro and Serbia.
- 2004 – Facebook, a mainstream online social networking site, is founded by Mark Zuckerberg and Eduardo Saverin.
- 2008 – Civic mobilizations in Colombia against FARC, under the name A million voices against the FARC.
- 2015 – TransAsia Airways Flight 235, with 58 people on board, en route from the Taiwanese capital Taipei to Kinmen, crashes into the Keelung River just after takeoff, killing 43 people.
- 2020 – The COVID-19 pandemic causes all casinos in Macau to be closed down for 15 days.
- 2025 – Ten people are killed in a mass shooting at an adult education centre in Örebro, Sweden.

== Births ==
=== Pre–1600 ===
- 1447 – Lodovico Lazzarelli, Italian poet (died 1500)
- 1495 – Francesco II Sforza, Duke of Milan (died 1535)
- 1495 – Jean Parisot de Valette, Grand Master of the Knights Hospitaller (died 1568)
- 1505 – Mikołaj Rej, Polish poet and author (died 1580)
- 1575 – Pierre de Bérulle, French cardinal and theologian, founded the French school of spirituality (died 1629)

=== 1601–1900 ===
- 1646 – Hans Erasmus Aßmann, German poet and politician (died 1699)
- 1677 – Johann Ludwig Bach, German violinist and composer (died 1731)
- 1688 – Pierre de Marivaux, French author and playwright (died 1763)
- 1725 – Dru Drury, English entomologist and author (died 1804)
- 1740 – Carl Michael Bellman, Swedish poet and composer (died 1795)
- 1778 – Augustin Pyramus de Candolle, Swiss botanist, mycologist, and academic (died 1841)
- 1799 – Almeida Garrett, Portuguese journalist and author (died 1854)
- 1803 – Antonija Höffern, Slovenian noblewoman (died 1871)
- 1818 – Emperor Norton, San Francisco eccentric and visionary (died 1880)
- 1831 – Oliver Ames, American financier and politician, 35th Governor of Massachusetts (died 1895)
- 1848 – Jean Aicard, French poet, author, and playwright (died 1921)
- 1849 – Jean Richepin, French poet, author, and playwright (died 1926)
- 1862 – Édouard Estaunié, French novelist (died 1942)
- 1865 – Abe Isoo, Japanese minister and politician (died 1949)
- 1868 – Constance Markievicz, Irish revolutionary and first woman elected to the UK House of Commons (died 1927)
- 1869 – Bill Haywood, American labor organizer (died 1928)
- 1871 – Friedrich Ebert, German lawyer and politician, first President of Germany (died 1925)
- 1872 – Gotse Delchev, Bulgarian and Macedonian revolutionary activist (died 1903)
- 1873 – Étienne Desmarteau, Canadian shot putter and discus thrower (died 1905)
- 1875 – Ludwig Prandtl, German physicist and engineer (died 1953)
- 1877 – Eddie Cochems, American football player and coach (died 1953)
- 1879 – Varia Kipiani, Georgian scientist
- 1881 – Eulalio Gutiérrez, Mexican general and politician, President of Mexico (died 1939)
- 1881 – Fernand Léger, French painter and sculptor (died 1955)
- 1881 – Kliment Voroshilov, Soviet politician and Marshal of the Soviet Union, People's Commissar for Defence (died 1969)
- 1883 – Reinhold Rudenberg, German-American inventor and a pioneer of electron microscopy (died 1961)
- 1891 – M. A. Ayyangar, Indian lawyer and politician, second Speaker of the Lok Sabha (died 1978)
- 1892 – E. J. Pratt, Canadian poet and academic (died 1964)
- 1893 – Raymond Dart, Australian paleoanthropologist (died 1988)
- 1895 – Nigel Bruce, English actor (died 1953)
- 1896 – Friedrich Glauser, Austrian-Swiss author (died 1938)
- 1896 – Friedrich Hund, German physicist and academic (died 1997)
- 1897 – Ludwig Erhard, German soldier and politician, second Chancellor of West Germany (died 1977)
- 1899 – Virginia M. Alexander, American physician and founder of the Aspiranto Health Home (died 1949)
- 1900 – Jacques Prévert, French poet and screenwriter (died 1977)

=== 1901–present ===
- 1902 – Charles Lindbergh, American pilot and explorer (died 1974)
- 1902 – Hartley Shawcross, Baron Shawcross, German-English lawyer and politician, Attorney General for England and Wales (died 2003)
- 1903 – Alexander Imich, Polish-American chemist, parapsychologist, and academic (died 2014)
- 1904 – MacKinlay Kantor, American author and screenwriter (died 1977)
- 1904 – Deng Yingchao, Chinese politician, Chairwoman of the Chinese People's Political Consultative Conference (died 1968)
- 1905 – Hylda Baker, English comedian, actress and music hall performer (died 1986)
- 1906 – Dietrich Bonhoeffer, German pastor and theologian (died 1945)
- 1906 – Letitia Dunbar-Harrison, Irish librarian (died 1994)
- 1906 – Clyde Tombaugh, American astronomer and academic, discovered Pluto (died 1997)
- 1908 – Julian Bell, English poet and academic (died 1937)
- 1912 – Ola Skjåk Bræk, Norwegian banker and politician, Norwegian Minister of Industry (died 1999)
- 1912 – Erich Leinsdorf, Austrian-American conductor (died 1993)
- 1912 – Byron Nelson, American golfer and sportscaster (died 2006)
- 1913 – Rosa Parks, American civil rights activist (died 2005)
- 1914 – Alfred Andersch, German-Swiss author and publisher (died 1980)
- 1915 – William Talman, American actor and screenwriter (died 1968)
- 1915 – Norman Wisdom, English comedian, actor and singer-songwriter (died 2010)
- 1917 – Yahya Khan, Pakistan general and politician, third President of Pakistan (died 1980)
- 1918 – Ida Lupino, English-American actress and director (died 1995)
- 1918 – Luigi Pareyson, Italian philosopher and author (died 1991)
- 1920 – Janet Waldo, American actress and voice artist (died 2016)
- 1921 – Betty Friedan, American author and feminist (died 2006)
- 1921 – Lotfi Zadeh, Iranian-American mathematician and computer scientist and founder of fuzzy logic (died 2017)
- 1922 – Bhimsen Joshi, Indian vocalist of the Hindustani classical music tradition (died 2011)
- 1923 – Conrad Bain, Canadian-American actor (died 2013)
- 1925 – Russell Hoban, American author and illustrator (died 2011)
- 1925 – Stanley Karnow, American journalist and historian (died 2013)
- 1925 – Christopher Zeeman, English mathematician and academic (died 2016)
- 1926 – Gyula Grosics, Hungarian footballer and manager (died 2014)
- 1927 – Rolf Landauer, German-American physicist and academic (died 1999)
- 1928 – Oscar Cabalén, Argentinian racing driver (died 1967)
- 1928 – Osmo Antero Wiio, Finnish journalist, academic, and politician (died 2013)
- 1929 – Jerry Adler, American actor, director, and producer (died 2025)
- 1929 – Paul Burlison, American musician (died 2003)
- 1929 – Neil Johnston, American basketball player (died 1978)
- 1930 – Tibor Antalpéter, Hungarian volleyball player and diplomat, Hungarian Ambassador to the United Kingdom (died 2012)
- 1930 – Arthur E. Chase, American businessman and politician (died 2015)
- 1930 – Jim Loscutoff, American basketball player and coach (died 2015)
- 1931 – Isabel Perón, Argentinian dancer and politician, 41st President of Argentina
- 1932 – Robert Coover, American novelist (died 2024)
- 1935 – Wallis Mathias, Pakistani cricketer (died 1994)
- 1935 – Martti Talvela, Finnish opera singer (died 1989)
- 1935 – Collin Wilcox, American actress (died 2009)
- 1936 – David Brenner, American comedian, actor, and author (died 2014)
- 1936 – Gary Conway, American actor
- 1936 – Claude Nobs, Swiss businessman, founded the Montreux Jazz Festival (died 2013)
- 1937 – Birju Maharaj, Indian dancer, composer, singer and exponent of the Lucknow "Kalka-Bindadin" Gharana of Kathak dance (died 2022)
- 1937 – David Newman, American director and screenwriter (died 2003)
- 1938 – Frank J. Dodd, American businessman and politician, president of the New Jersey Senate (died 2010)
- 1939 – Stan Lundine, American lawyer and politician, Lieutenant Governor of New York
- 1940 – George A. Romero, American director and producer (died 2017)
- 1940 – John Schuck, American actor
- 1941 – Russell Cooper, Australian politician, 33rd Premier of Queensland
- 1941 – Ron Rangi, New Zealand rugby player (died 1988)
- 1941 – Jiří Raška, Czech skier and coach (died 2012)
- 1941 – John Steel, English musician and songwriter
- 1943 – Alberto João Jardim, Portuguese journalist and politician, second President of the Regional Government of Madeira
- 1943 – Wanda Rutkiewicz, Lithuanian-Polish mountaineer (died 1992)
- 1943 – Ken Thompson, American computer scientist and programmer, co-developed the B programming language
- 1944 – Florence LaRue, American singer and actress
- 1944 – Alan Shields, American artist and ship captain (died 2005)
- 1947 – Dennis C. Blair, American admiral and politician, third Director of National Intelligence
- 1947 – Dan Quayle, American sergeant, lawyer, and politician, 44th Vice President of the United States
- 1948 – Alice Cooper, American singer-songwriter
- 1948 – Mienoumi Tsuyoshi, Japanese sumo wrestler
- 1949 – Michael Beck, American actor
- 1949 – Rasim Delić, Bosnian general (died 2010)
- 1951 – Patrick Bergin, Irish actor
- 1952 – Lisa Eichhorn, American actress, writer, and producer
- 1952 – Jenny Shipley, New Zealand politician, Prime Minister of New Zealand
- 1952 – Thomas Silverstein, American criminal and prisoner (died 2019)
- 1955 – Mikuláš Dzurinda, Slovak politician, Prime Minister of Slovakia
- 1957 – Matthew Cobb, British zoologist and author
- 1958 – Tomasz Pacyński, Polish journalist and author (died 2005)
- 1959 – Christian Schreier, German footballer and manager
- 1959 – Lawrence Taylor, American football player
- 1960 – Siobhan Dowd, English author and activist (died 2007)
- 1960 – Jonathan Larson, American lyricist, composer, and playwright (died 1996)
- 1961 – Denis Savard, Canadian ice hockey player and coach
- 1962 – Clint Black, American singer-songwriter, guitarist, and producer
- 1962 – Vern Fleming, American basketball player
- 1963 – Noodles, American musician and songwriter
- 1963 – Pirmin Zurbriggen, Swiss skier
- 1964 – Elke Philipp, German Paralympic equestrian
- 1965 – Jerome Brown, American football player (died 1992)
- 1966 – Viatcheslav Ekimov, Russian cyclist
- 1967 – Sergei Grinkov, Russian figure skater (died 1995)
- 1970 – Gabrielle Anwar, English-American actress
- 1970 – Hunter Biden, American attorney and lobbyist
- 1971 – Rob Corddry, American actor, producer, and screenwriter
- 1971 – Michael A. Goorjian, American actor, director, and writer
- 1972 – Giovanni, Brazilian footballer and manager
- 1972 – Dara Ó Briain, Irish comedian and television host
- 1973 – Oscar De La Hoya, American boxer
- 1975 – Natalie Imbruglia, Australian singer-songwriter and actress
- 1976 – Cam'ron, American rapper and actor
- 1977 – Gavin DeGraw, American singer-songwriter
- 1979 – Giorgio Pantano, Italian racing driver
- 1980 – Raimonds Vaikulis, Latvian basketball player
- 1981 – Jason Kapono, American basketball player
- 1981 – Johan Vansummeren, Belgian cyclist
- 1982 – Ivars Timermanis, Latvian basketball player
- 1983 – Hannibal Buress, American comedian and actor
- 1983 – Rebecca White, Australian politician
- 1984 – Doug Fister, American baseball player
- 1984 – Mauricio Pinilla, Chilean footballer
- 1986 – Maximilian Götz, German racing driver
- 1986 – Mahmudullah Riyad, Bangladeshi cricketer
- 1987 – Darren O'Dea, Irish footballer
- 1987 – Lucie Šafářová, Czech tennis player
- 1988 – Charlie Barnett, American actor
- 1988 – Carly Patterson, American gymnast and singer
- 1989 – Lavoy Allen, American basketball player
- 1990 – Haruka Tomatsu, Japanese voice actress and singer
- 1996 – Mohamed Sherif, Egyptian footballer
- 1998 – Malik Monk, American basketball player
- 1998 – Maximilian Wöber, Austrian footballer
- 1999 – MJ Lenderman, American singer-songwriter and multi-instrumentalist
- 2003 – Kyla Kenedy, American actress
- 2003 – Rasmus Højlund, Danish footballer

== Deaths ==
=== Pre–1600 ===
- 211 – Septimius Severus, Roman emperor (born 145)
- 708 – Pope Sisinnius (born 650)
- 856 – Rabanus Maurus, Frankish archbishop and theologian (born 780)
- 870 – Ceolnoth, archbishop of Canterbury
- 1169 – John of Ajello, Bishop of Catania
- 1498 – Antonio del Pollaiuolo, Italian artist (born 1429/1433)
- 1505 – Jeanne de Valois, daughter of Louis XI of France (born 1464)
- 1508 – Conrad Celtes, German poet and scholar (born 1459)
- 1555 – John Rogers, English clergyman and translator (born 1505)
- 1590 – Gioseffo Zarlino, Italian composer and theorist (born 1517)

=== 1601–1900 ===
- 1615 – Giambattista della Porta, Italian playwright and scholar (born 1535)
- 1617 – Lodewijk Elzevir, Dutch publisher, co-founded the House of Elzevir (born 1546)
- 1713 – Anthony Ashley-Cooper, 3rd Earl of Shaftesbury, English philosopher and politician (born 1671)
- 1774 – Charles Marie de La Condamine, French mathematician and geographer (born 1701)
- 1781 – Josef Mysliveček, Czech composer (born 1737)
- 1799 – Étienne-Louis Boullée, French architect and educator (born 1728)
- 1843 – Theodoros Kolokotronis, Greek general (born 1770)
- 1891 – Pelagio Antonio de Labastida y Dávalos, Roman Catholic archbishop and Mexican politician who served as regent during the Second Mexican Empire (born 1816)

=== 1901–present ===
- 1905 – Louis-Ernest Barrias, French sculptor and academic (born 1841)
- 1912 – Franz Reichelt, French tailor and inventor (born 1878)
- 1926 – İskilipli Âtıf Hodja, Turkish author and scholar (born 1875)
- 1928 – Hendrik Lorentz, Dutch physicist and academic, Nobel Prize laureate (born 1853)
- 1933 – Archibald Sayce, English linguist and educator (born 1846)
- 1936 – Wilhelm Gustloff, German-Swiss soldier, founded Swiss NSDAP/AO (born 1895)
- 1940 – Nikolai Yezhov, Russian police officer and politician (born 1895)
- 1943 – Frank Calder, English-Canadian ice hockey player and journalist (born 1877)
- 1944 – Arsen Kotsoyev, Russian author and translator (born 1872)
- 1956 – Savielly Tartakower, Russian-French chess player, journalist, and author (born 1887)
- 1958 – Henry Kuttner, American author and screenwriter (born 1915)
- 1959 – Una O'Connor, Irish-American actress (born 1880)
- 1968 – Neal Cassady, American novelist and poet (born 1926)
- 1970 – Louise Bogan, American poet and critic (born 1897)
- 1974 – Satyendra Nath Bose, Indian physicist, mathematician, and academic (born 1894)
- 1975 – Louis Jordan, American singer-songwriter and saxophonist (born 1908)
- 1982 – Alex Harvey, Scottish singer-songwriter and guitarist (born 1935)
- 1982 – Georg Konrad Morgen, German lawyer and judge (born 1909)
- 1983 – Karen Carpenter, American singer (born 1950)
- 1987 – Liberace, American singer-songwriter and pianist, (born 1919)
- 1987 – Meena Keshwar Kamal, Afghan activist, founded the Revolutionary Association of the Women of Afghanistan (born 1956)
- 1987 – Carl Rogers, American psychologist and academic (born 1902)
- 1990 – Whipper Billy Watson, Canadian-American wrestler and trainer (born 1915)
- 1992 – John Dehner, American actor (born 1915)
- 1995 – Patricia Highsmith, American novelist and short story writer (born 1921)
- 2000 – Carl Albert, American lawyer and politician, 54th Speaker of the United States House of Representatives (born 1908)
- 2002 – Count Sigvard Bernadotte of Wisborg (born 1907)
- 2003 – Benyoucef Benkhedda, Algerian pharmacist and politician (born 1920)
- 2004 – Hilda Hilst, Brazilian poet, novelist, and playwright (born 1930)
- 2005 – Ossie Davis, American actor, director, and playwright (born 1917)
- 2006 – Betty Friedan, American author and activist (born 1921)
- 2007 – José Carlos Bauer, Brazilian footballer and manager (born 1925)
- 2007 – Ilya Kormiltsev, Russian-English poet and translator (born 1959)
- 2007 – Barbara McNair, American singer and actress (born 1934)
- 2007 – Jules Olitski, Ukrainian-American painter and sculptor (born 1922)
- 2007 – Alfred Worm, Austrian journalist, author, and academic (born 1945)
- 2008 – Augusta Dabney, American actress (born 1918)
- 2008 – Stefan Meller, Polish academic and politician, Minister of Foreign Affairs of Poland (born 1942)
- 2010 – Kostas Axelos, Greek-French philosopher and author (born 1924)
- 2010 – Helen Tobias-Duesberg, Estonian-American composer (born 1919)
- 2011 – Martial Célestin, Haitian lawyer and politician, first Prime Minister of Haiti (born 1913)
- 2012 – István Csurka, Hungarian journalist and politician (born 1934)
- 2012 – Florence Green, English soldier (born 1901)
- 2012 – Robert Daniel, American farmer, soldier, and politician (born 1936)
- 2012 – Mike deGruy, American director, producer, and cinematographer (born 1951)
- 2012 – Susanne Suba, Hungarian-born watercolorist and illustrator, active in the United States (born 1913)
- 2013 – Donald Byrd, American trumpet player (born 1932)
- 2013 – Reg Presley, English singer-songwriter (born 1941)
- 2014 – Keith Allen, Canadian-American ice hockey player, coach, and manager (born 1923)
- 2014 – Eugenio Corti, Italian soldier, author, and playwright (born 1921)
- 2014 – Dennis Lota, Zambian footballer (born 1973)
- 2015 – Fitzhugh L. Fulton, American colonel and pilot (born 1925)
- 2016 – Edgar Mitchell, American captain, pilot, and astronaut (born 1930)
- 2017 – Steve Lang, Canadian bass player (born 1949)
- 2017 – Bano Qudsia, Pakistani writer (born 1928)
- 2018 – John Mahoney, English-American actor, voice artist, and comedian (born 1940)
- 2019 – Matti Nykänen, Finnish Olympic-winning ski jumper and singer (born 1963)
- 2020 – Daniel arap Moi, Former President of Kenya (born 1924)
- 2021 – Millie Hughes-Fulford, American astronaut, molecular biologist and NASA payload specialist (born 1945)
- 2022 – Kim In-hyeok, South Korean volleyball player (born 1995)
- 2023 – Vani Jairam, Indian playback singer (born 1945)
- 2023 – Sherif Ismail, 53rd Prime Minister of Egypt (born 1955)
- 2024 – Barry John, Welsh rugby player (born 1945)
- 2025 – Aga Khan IV, 49th Imam of the Nizari Isma'ili community (born 1936)

== Holidays and observances ==
- Christian feast day:
  - Andrew Corsini
  - Eduardo Francisco Pironio
  - Gilbert of Sempringham
  - John de Brito
  - Goldrofe of Arganil
  - Blessed Rabanus Maurus
  - Rimbert
  - February 4 (Eastern Orthodox liturgics)
- Day of the Armed Struggle (Angola)
- Earliest day on which Ash Wednesday can fall, while March 10 is the latest; celebrated on the first day of Lent (Western Christianity)
- Independence Day (Sri Lanka)
- Rosa Parks Day (California and Missouri, United States)
- World Cancer Day
- International Day of Human Fraternity
