= World Ovarian Cancer Day =

Observance dedicated to raising awareness

World Ovarian Cancer Day (WOCD) is an international awareness day marked on May 8 to increase the ovarian cancer awareness, policy advocacy, and improvement of patient outcome globally. The World Ovarian Cancer Day is led by the World Ovarian Cancer Coalition since 2013. The addresses the persistent challenges, stigma and misinformation associated to ovarian including late diagnosis, limited public awareness, disparities in accessibility, affordability, and availability of optimum ovarian cancer diagnosis, treatment and care. Women living with ovarian cancer have used this day to share their lived experience with ovarian cancer on blogs, websites, newspapers and social media platforms. Organizations around the world have also used this day to launch grant and funding calls, new policy changes, drive advocacy, expand research and promotion of new treatments.

== History ==
World Ovarian Cancer Day was first observed on May 8, 2013, following collaboration of 27 organizations from 18 countries, with Ovarian Cancer Canada playing a central founding role and coordinated by a newly formed World Ovarian Cancer Day Committee. This committee eventually evolved to become the World Ovarian Cancer Coalition. Additionally, on May 1, 2013, John Ruttan, the mayor of the city of Nanaimo in Canada signed a proclamation recognising the World Ovarian Cancer Day.

== World Ovarian Cancer Day themes ==
The World Ovarian Cancer Coalition releases different themes and campaign names for the international day. The 2026 theme was #ReachForTheScars.

== See also ==
- World Cancer Day
- World Health Day
- Breast Cancer Awareness Month (October in the United States)
- National Prostate Health Month (September in the United States)
- World Lymphoma Awareness Day (15 September)
- World Health Observances
