= Kristian Johns =

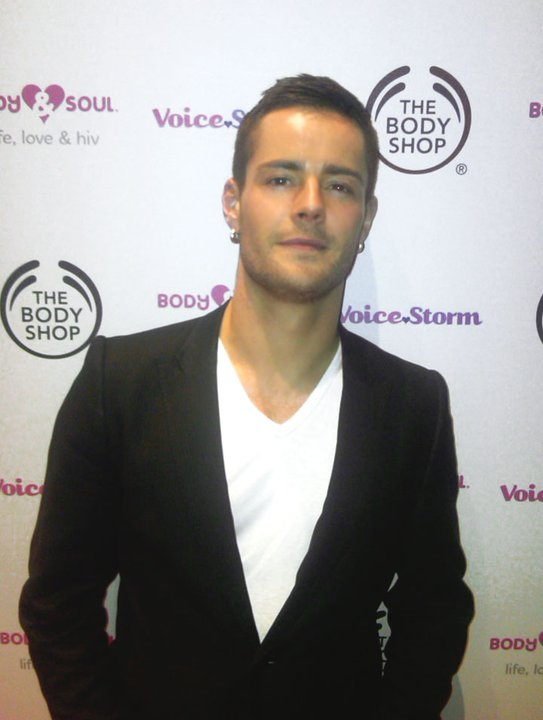
Kristian Jackson at Voice Storm, in support of the Body & Soul charity, The Roundhouse, October 2010

Kristian Jackson (professionally known as Kristian Johns) is a British author, journalist, and activist known chiefly for his work in the field of sexual health and HIV awareness.

== Journalism ==
Kristian's column 'Kristian+Life' ran for four years in FS Magazine, a sexual health magazine published by GMFA (later relaunched as the digital-only publication 'The Fact Site'). He also wrote a bi-monthly column for Attitude Magazine for three years, as well as being a regular contributor to a number of other LGBT publications. His work was published under the name Kristian Johns.

He stepped down from both columns in 2015, citing the need for "powerful new voices [to] take centre stage". In his last column for FS, he joked that people will "still find me shaking buckets on street corners, tweeting to anyone who will listen, and working in the background to do my bit."

== Writing ==
Jackson's first short story, "Dying and Other Superpowers" was published under the name Kristian Johns in Boys And Girls, an anthology of short stories by gay and lesbian writers curated by author Paul Burston. The story was later adapted to a short film of the same name.

Dying And Other Superpowers was screened in a number of film festivals around the world, including the Cannes Film Festival and the Rushes Soho Shorts Film Festival.

In 2015, he co-authored Man to Man: Gay Men's Health Made Easy with Jim Pollard of The Men's Health Forum, which received a commendation from the British Medical Association Patient Information Awards 2016. He also contributed to the first edition of 'This Book Is Gay' by Juno Dawson.

== Charity work and activism ==
From 2008 to 2010, Kristian served alongside his friend and fellow HIV activist, Clint Walters, as a director of the HIV charity Health Initiatives. The charity's key mission at the time was to open a weekend HIV testing centre in Central London. Health Initiatives was disbanded in 2010 after Walters died of a heart attack

In 2010, Kristian took part in UNAIDS and The Body Shop's Be An Activist campaign, a photographic exhibition featuring other prominent HIV activists such as Annie Lennox. The campaign was shot by celebrity photographer Rankin and was launched in Body Shop stores on World AIDS Day 2010 with the backing of the then Mayor of London, Boris Johnson.

Kristian was also invited to City Hall, London to speak alongside Johnson at the launch of an exhibition of images from the campaign. The exhibition ran at City Hall from 29 November until 7 December 2010.

== Personal life ==
Kristian was born in Basildon, Essex, and is one of four children. He also lived for a short while in Swarthmore Pennsylvania.

After being diagnosed as HIV positive in 2002, Kristian became an advocate for HIV awareness, and campaigns publicly around issues like regular testing, stigma and funding for HIV services.

In 2018, Kristian amicably separated from his husband of eight years.

He currently lives in Stockwell, London.

== Awards and nominations ==
In 2014, Jackson (as Kristian Johns) was named in The Independent On Sunday's Rainbow List as one of their 'Ones To Watch'. He was also ranked 49th in Pink News top 50 Twitter users influencing LGBT life in 2011 alongside Ellen DeGeneres and Stephen Fry.

== Publications ==
- Boys & Girls, Glasshouse Books, 2010, ISBN 978-1-907536-09-0
- This Book Is Gay, Hot Key Books, 2014, ISBN 978-1471403958
- Man to Man: Gay Men's Health Made Easy, Men's Health Forum, 2015, ISBN 978-1906121907
