= VGM Gastro Centre =

VGM Hospital

Geography
- Location: Coimbatore, Tamil Nadu, India
- Coordinates: 10.998423°N 77.0122203°E

Services
- Emergency department: Yes
- Beds: 150

History
- Founded: 2009

Links
- Website: www.vgmhospital.com
- Lists: Hospitals in India

The VGM Hospital is a specialist gastroenterology and emerging multi‑specialty hospital located in Singanallur, Coimbatore, India. Founded in 2009 as India’s first NABH-accredited gastroenterology-only hospital, VGM Hospital began with a 150-bed facility focused on digestive and liver care. In 2012, the foundation stone for a new advanced gastroenterology block was laid by Tamil Nadu Governor Konijeti Rosaiah In March 2025, the hospital expanded into a six-storey, multi‑specialty facility (~150 beds) adding services such as liver and kidney transplantation, advanced cardiology with a cath lab, liver ICU, dialysis centre, interventional radiology, and dedicated inpatient rooms.

== Specialities ==
The specialties services offered at the hospital are:

- Medical gastroenterology
- Surgical gastroenterology
- Oncology
- Critical Care
- (HPB) and liver transplantation
- Endoscopy

== Projects ==
To safeguard children aged between four and twelve in poor families against Hepatitis B infection that could damage the liver will be given one free dose of vaccination and two more doses at Rs.50 a dose under a project led by Dr. V.G. Mohan Prasad which is jointly organized by Rotary Club of Coimbatore East and VGM Hospital, Coimbatore.

== Public awareness ==
In October 2010 V.G.M. Hospital and The Hindu teamed up to generate awareness among the people on hepatitis in Coimbatore.

VGM Hospital, Coimbatore, have launched a free check-up and investigations at an affordable price for cancer screening on the observance of World Cancer Day until February 11, 2019. The chairman of the hospital, Dr V.G. Mohan Prasad, said that 2-4 cases of cancer are diagnosed every day at the hospital.

== Awards ==
City-based gastroenterologist Dr V G Mohan Prasad received the state government's ‘Best Doctor’ award from health minister Dr.C.Vijayabaskar in Chennai on August 22, 2019, for his work in the field of liver diseases.

== Academic & Training Programs ==
- Offers Fellowships in Minimal Access Surgery and Therapeutic Endoscopy, affiliated with Tamil Nadu Dr. MGR Medical University.
- Hosts the EASIE Animal-Model Training Workshop, recognized by the Society of Gastrointestinal Endoscopy of India (SGEI)
