= World Health Observances =

International Observances denote a period to observe an issue of international interest or concern. Many of these observances have been established by the United Nations General Assembly, United Nations Economic and Social Council or World Health Organization. World Health Observances mark a period which is often used to promote an issue and mobilize for action. Below follows a list of days and months which have been denoted as health related observances.

== January ==
- 4 January - World Braille Day
- World Leprosy Day

== February ==
- World Cancer Day
- World Day of the Sick
- International Childhood Cancer Day
- Rare Disease Day

== March ==
- World Tuberculosis Day

== April ==
- World Health Day
- World Parkinson’s Awareness Day
- European Patients Rights Day
- World Chagas Disease Day
- World Malaria Day
- Testicular Cancer Awareness Month
- World Immunization Week

== May ==
- European Cancer Prevention Week
- World Ovarian Cancer Day

== June ==
- International Day for Protection of Children
- World Blood Donor Day
- Men’s Health Month
- National Safety Month
- International Men’s Health Week
- Men’s Health Week

== July ==
- World Hepatitis Day

== August ==
- First week Of August- World Breast Feeding Awareness Week

== October ==
- Breast Cancer Awareness Month
- Vegetarian Awareness Month
- World Mental Health Day
- World Arthritis Day
- World Osteoporosis Day
- Dwarfism Awareness Month

== November ==
- World Diabetes Day
- World Antimicrobial Awareness Week
- World Vegan Month
- World Chronic Obstructive Pulmonary Disease Day

== December ==
- World AIDS Day
- International Day of Epidemic Preparedness
