= World Cancer Day =

International day to raise awareness of cancer

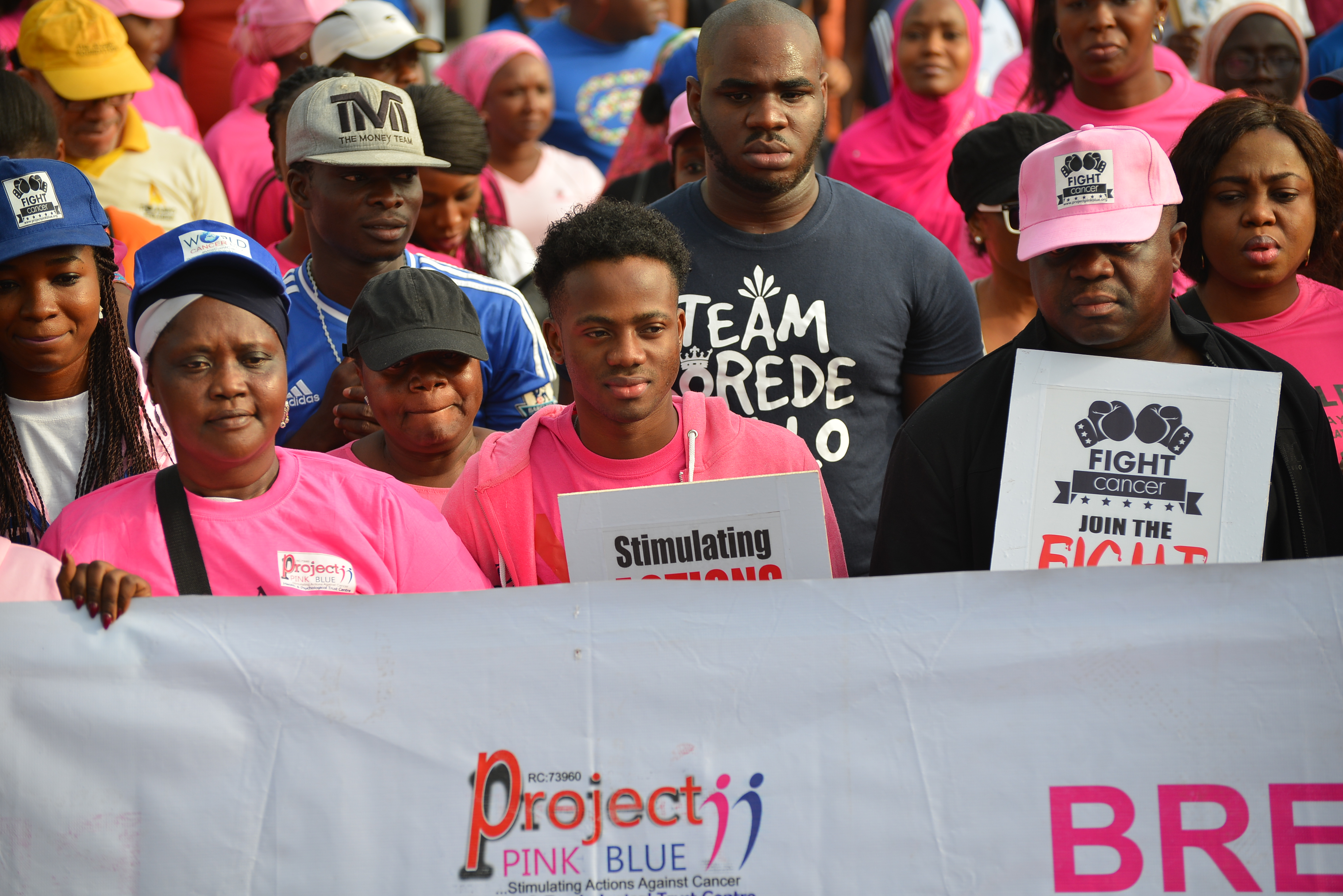
- World Cancer Day 2017 Initiative by Project Pink Blue
- Also called: WCD
- Observances: Awareness of cancer and its prevention
- Date: 4 February
- Next time: 4 February 2027
- Frequency: Annual
- Related to: Cancer Disease

World Cancer Day is an international day marked on 4 February to raise awareness of cancer and to encourage its prevention, detection, and treatment. World Cancer Day is led by the Union for International Cancer Control (UICC) to support the goals of the World Cancer Declaration, written in 2008. The primary goal of World Cancer Day is to significantly reduce illness and death caused by cancer and is an opportunity to rally the international community to end the injustice of preventable suffering from cancer.

World Cancer Day targets misinformation, raises awareness, and reduces stigma. Multiple initiatives are run on World Cancer Day to show support for those affected by cancer. Hundreds of events around the world also take place.

== History ==
World Cancer Day was established on 4 February 2000 at the World Cancer Summit Against Cancer for the New Millennium, which was held in Paris.

The Charter of Paris against cancer, which was created to promote research, prevent cancer, improve patient services, also included an article establishing the anniversary of the document's official signing as World Cancer Day, was signed at the Summit by the then General Director of UNESCO, Kōichirō Matsuura, and then French President Jacques Chirac in Paris on 4 February 2000.

== World Cancer Day themes ==
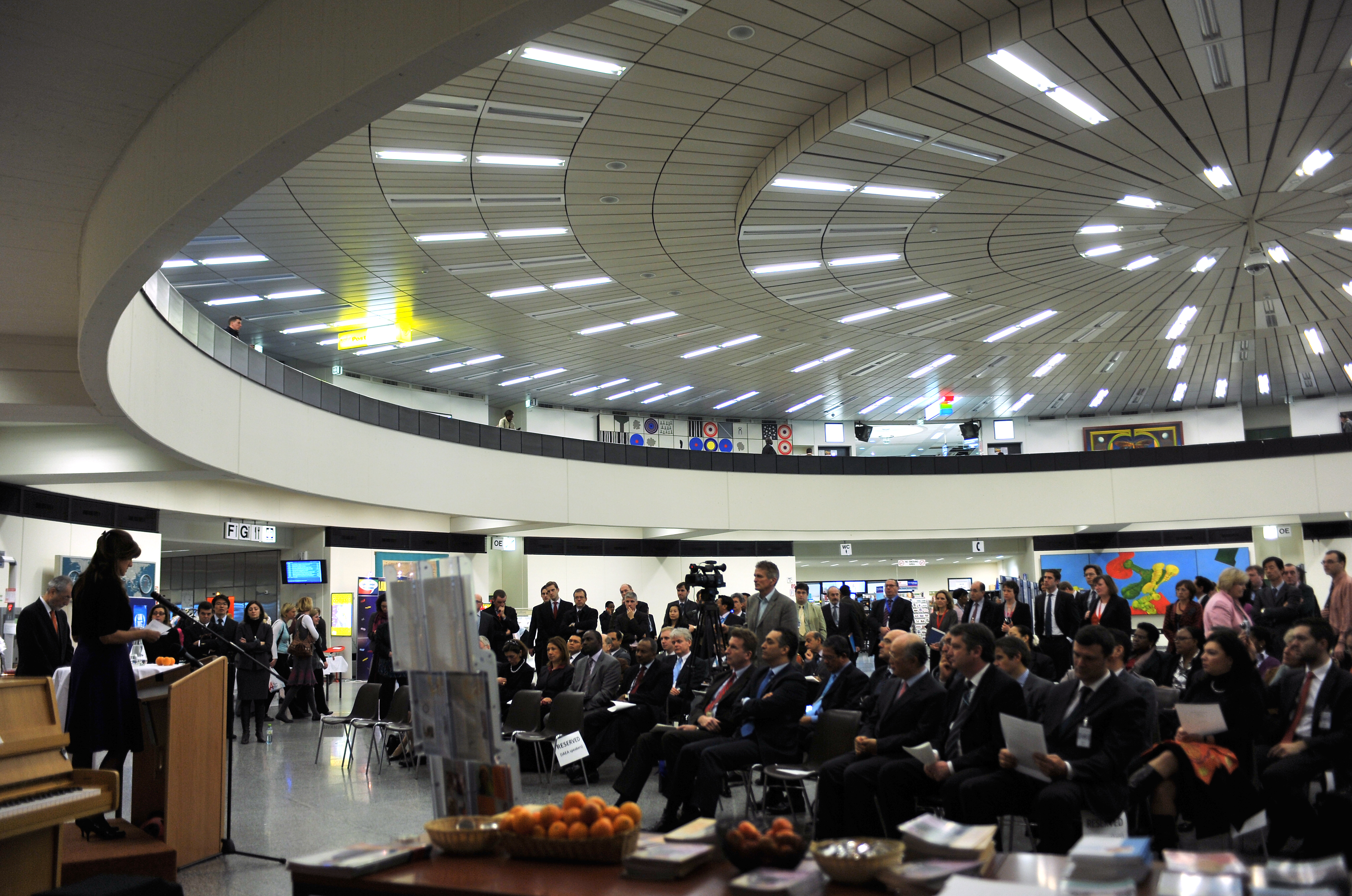
World Cancer Day 2011 in Vienna

The theme for the years 2025-2027 is 'United by Unique, which "places people at the centre of care and their stories at the heart of the conversation."

The 2022-2024 campaign theme was 'Close the care gap' that focuses on eliminating the difference in access to cancer care services faced by populations of various groups of country income, age, gender, ethnicity etc.

The 2019-2021 campaign theme was 'I Am and I Will'. The theme seeks to counter the negative attitude and fatalistic belief that nothing can be done about cancer, and instead promotes how our personal actions can be powerful and impactful.

In 2016, World Cancer Day started a three-year campaign under the tagline of 'We can. I can.', which explored the power of collective and individual actions to reduce the impact of cancer. Prior to 2016, the campaign themes included "Not Beyond Us" (2015) and "Debunk the Myths" (2014).

Year	Theme
2025 -2027	'United by Unique'
2022 -2024	'Close the care gap'
2019 - 2021	'I Am and I Will.'
2016 - 2018	'We can. I can.'
2015	Not Beyond Us
2014	Debunk the Myths
2013	Cancer Myths - Get the Facts
2012	Together let's do something
2010 - 2011	Cancer can be prevented
2009 - 2010	'I love my healthy active childhood'

== The Sustainable Development Goals ==
Cancer and the Sustainable Development Goals (SDGs) share a multifaceted and core link to achieving worldwide development and health goals. An overview of such a nexus in brief is presented below: The SDGs adopted in 2015 have an expansive agenda of sustainable development and recognize non-communicable diseases (NCDs), of which cancer forms a part, as major development and health problems. Specifically, SDG 3.4 establishes a target for reducing NCD deaths, including cancer, by one-third through prevention and treatment.

Cancer represents a significant economic and social burden, particularly in low- and middle-income nations (LMICs), which account for the majority of cancer-related deaths. Reducing the burden is important for relieving social and economic inequality and achieving sustainable development.

Strengthening healthcare systems via cost-effective cancer interventions can elevate the capacity of a country to respond to health needs and contribute to an overall SDG target.

In conclusion, the elimination of cancer is part of the realization of the SDGs, particularly SDG 3, because it has implications on health, economic growth, and social equity. Such achievements require coordinated efforts in prevention, treatment, and strengthening healthcare systems.

== Results ==
World Cancer Day is marked by the international cancer community, governments and individuals around the world. Each year, nearly 1,000 activities take place in over 100 countries,

World Cancer Day generates over 25,000 press mentions in more than 150 countries, half a million social media mentions, and trends each year on social media on 4 February.

In recent years, cities have begun to support the day by lighting up important landmarks in orange and blue – nearly 140 landmarks in 80 countries in 2024. At least 60 governments officially observe World Cancer Day.

== See also ==
- Breast Cancer Awareness Month (October in the United States)
- National Prostate Health Month (September in the United States)
- World Lymphoma Awareness Day (15 September)
- World Health Observances
- World Ovarian Cancer Day (May 8)
