= Charter of Paris against Cancer =

Charter of Paris against cancer
- Host country: France
- Date: 4 February 2000
- Cities: Paris
- Venues: Palais de l'Elysee
- Chair: David Khayat
- Website: parischarteragainstcancer.org

The Charter of Paris against Cancer is an international convention that commits signatory countries and individuals to better combat cancer, notably through support for medical research, the implementation of screening policies, and the development of support measures for patients.

President Jacques Chirac, representing France, was the first signatory of the Charter on February 4, 2000. It is in memory of this event that February 4 was chosen to become World Cancer Day.

Since its first ratification, the Charter continues to be promoted by the AVEC Foundation established by oncologist David Khayat, who was among the personalities behind the text. Each year, the Foundation organizes an annual gala at the Palace of Versailles, during which the "Charter of Paris against cancer Awards" are presented to recognize individuals committed to the fight against cancer.

== History ==
In 1999, Professor David Khayat decided with several colleagues to draw attention from governments and public opinion to the fight against cancer. During a meeting in Paris among specialists on the subject, including David Khayat and doctors Gabriel N. Hortobagyi, Peter Harper, James F. Holland, Lawrence H. Einhorn, and Martine Piccart, the idea emerged to create the "Charter of Paris against cancer," an international political document that would establish the general principles for global action against this disease, considered by WHO as a major cause of death worldwide.

On February 4, 2000, during the first World Summit against cancer organized in Paris, the Charter was signed at the Élysée Palace by French President Chirac, UNESCO Director-General Kōichirō Matsuura, and over a hundred doctors, oncologists, and biologists from around the world. The text of the Charter was subsequently intended to be signed by politicians and doctors from around the world, but also by patients and their families.

The ratification of this text by the French government led to the simultaneous adoption of a "National Cancer Control Program" in the country, aimed at strengthening prevention, screening, the quality of care, and patients' rights. This plan foreshadowed the first Cancer Plan, announced on March 23, 2003, by President Jacques Chirac, and implemented between 2003 and 2007 with the objective of raising public awareness about cancer and taking effective measures to defeat it. This program also gave rise to the French National Cancer Institute in 2005.

With the support of oncologists from around the world and significant patient associations, the Charter of Paris against cancer has been translated into many languages to facilitate its global reach. It is now promoted by the AVEC Foundation, chaired by Khayat.

== Content ==
The Charter consists of ten articles. These define principles and actions to be implemented to improve access to and the quality of care for patients in order to increase their chances of survival.

- Article 1 upholds the dignity of patients by stating that "Every person with cancer has the same rights as any human being." This is a principle of non-discrimination aimed at preserving the patient's place in society.
- Article 2 emphasizes the need to change the way individuals view cancer and cancer patients and "redefine this disease as a potentially curable biological condition and not a social condition."
- Article 3 requires signatories to support medical research against cancer. "The parties commit to making every effort to improve government and industrial funding for fundamental research (...) and to improve conditions that allow scientists to work freely." The article also emphasizes the importance of clinical research to "enable the realization of rapid and effective clinical trials."
- Article 4 urges parties to focus on the quality of care provided to patients to reduce statistical disparities observed in survival rates.
- Article 5 promotes cancer prevention and the implementation of awareness campaigns to curb the rapid progression of the disease forecasted by the World Health Organization. The article particularly highlights the importance of "public education on tobacco consumption."
- Article 6 advocates for the development of screening so that all individuals can benefit from it "regardless of their race, nationality, or socio-economic conditions."
- Article 7 aims to improve patient care and make them "an active partner in the fight against cancer" by strengthening their ties with healthcare professionals.
- Article 8, starting from the premise that "survival probabilities can be affected by the mental and physical state of the patient," requires the commitment of signatories to improve the quality of life of patients "at all stages of the disease," including "when cancer is not curable."
- Article 9 pushes for national planning in the fight against cancer to establish a relevant strategy "based on resources and local needs."
- Article 10 encourages the establishment of global alliances and networks, alongside the national effort required in Article 9, to more effectively achieve all the objectives set by the Charter. It also proclaims that February 4 will be considered World Cancer Day.

== Signatories ==
During its initial ratification on February 4, 2000, the Charter was signed by 156 individuals, a majority of whom were doctors and oncologists, often directors of specialized medical institutes in oncology. On the diplomatic front, in addition to Jacques Chirac and Kōichirō Matsuura, signatories included Elie Wiesel and Princess Chulabhorn of Thailand. In total, the signatories hailed from about thirty different countries. A few months later, in July 2000, the Charter was also signed by cyclist Lance Armstrong, himself a cancer survivor, at the conclusion of the 2000 Tour de France.

Several countries subsequently joined the Charter in the following years, including Tunisia in 2006, Ukraine in 2007, Uzbekistan in 2010, and Kazakhstan in 2011.

== Charter of Paris against cancer Awards ==
The AVEC Foundation, responsible for promoting the Charter, organizes an annual charity gala held at the Palace of Versailles, with the venue graciously provided by the French State. These events bring together several hundred guests, including celebrities from the worlds of music, cinema, politics, and business. On this occasion, the foundation presents the "Paris Charter Against Cancer Awards," which annually recognize several individuals who have demonstrated their commitment to the fight against cancer.

Among the recipients of the award are notably scientists or institute directors who have been able to advance cancer research, leaders of foundations or associations dedicated to supporting patients, as well as significant donors. The award was notably presented in 2010 to the Princess of Morocco, Lalla Salma, President of the Lalla Salma Foundation for Cancer Prevention and Treatment, or in 2012 to François Pinault.
