= World Day of the Sick =

Catholic awareness day on February 11

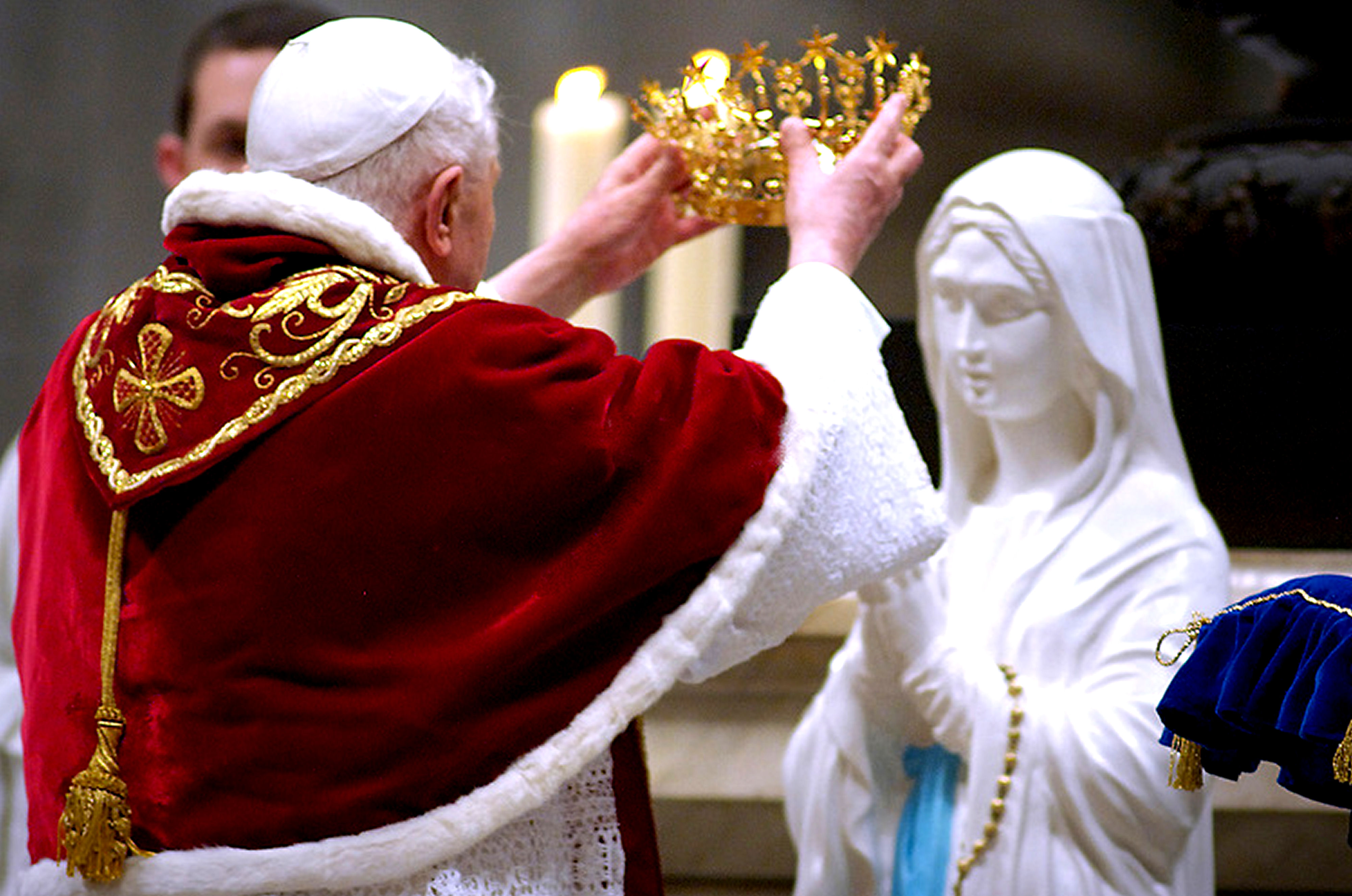
- Pope Benedict XVI placing a crown on a statue of Our Lady of Lourdes on the World Day of the Sick, 11 February 2007, Saint Peter's Basilica
- Observed by: Catholic Church
- Date: 11 February
- Next time: 11 February 2027
- Frequency: Annual
- First time: 11 February 1993
- Related to: Our Lady of Lourdes

The World Day of the Sick is an awareness day, or observance, in the Catholic Church intended for "prayer and sharing, of offering one's suffering for the good of the Church and of reminding everyone to see in his sick brother or sister the face of Christ". The day was instituted on 13 May 1992 by Pope John Paul II and is celebrated on 11 February, also the memorial of Our Lady of Lourdes. The day is not a liturgical celebration.

== History ==
Pope John Paul II had been diagnosed with Parkinson's disease as early as 1991, an illness which was only confirmed in 2001, and it is significant that he decided to create the World Day of the Sick only one year after his diagnosis. The pope had written a great deal on the topic of suffering and believed that it was very much a salvific and redeeming process through Christ, as he indicated in his apostolic letter Salvifici doloris.

He chose the memorial of Our Lady of Lourdes for the date of the observance because many pilgrims and visitors to Lourdes, France, have been reported to have been healed at the Marian Sanctuary there through the intercession of the Blessed Virgin. The pope also venerated the sanctuary of Harissa in Lebanon.

Pope Francis continued the practice of celebrating the day, which was celebrated for the 33rd time in February 2025. Pope Leo XIV likewise issued a message for the 34th annual celebration on 11 February 2026, emphasising "the beauty of charity and the social dimension of compassion".

== See also ==
- World Health Observances
