= David Khayat =

French oncologist

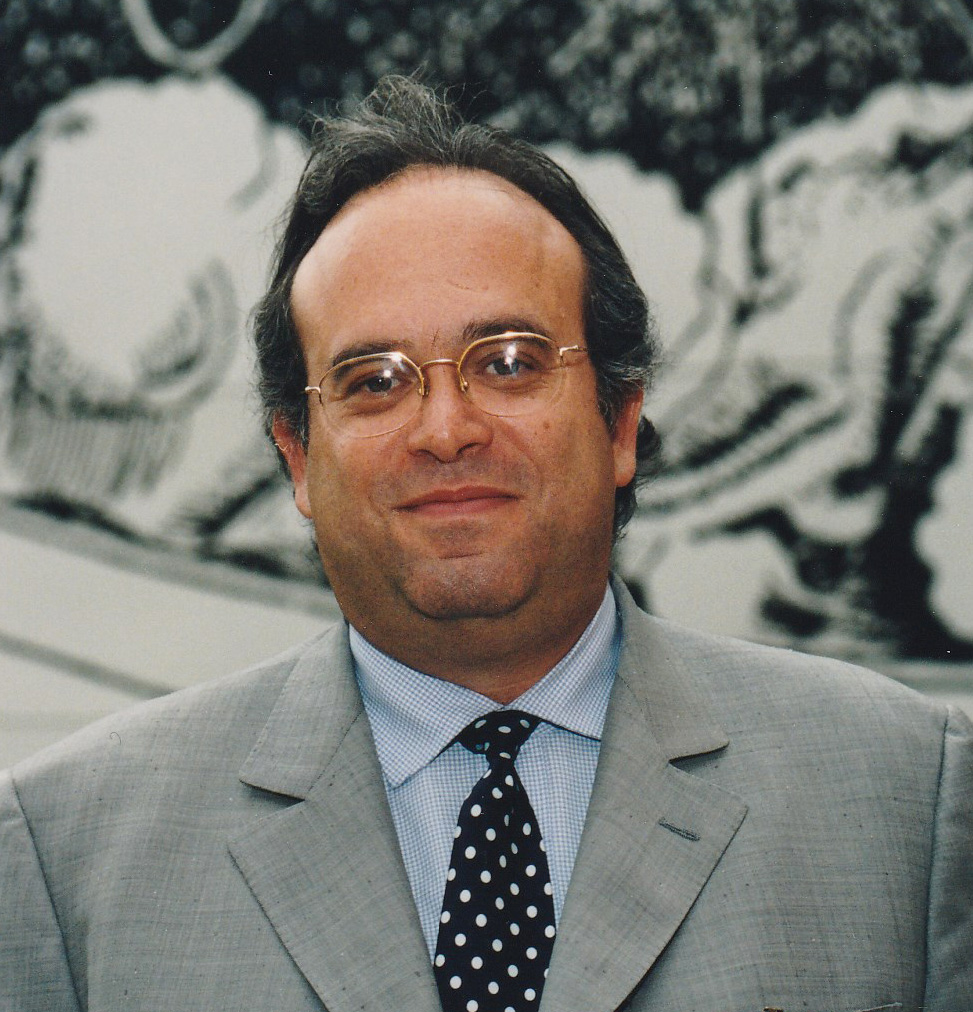
David Khayat, president of the International Geography Festival in 2000

David Khayat (born August 27, 1956) is a French oncologist. Head of the Department of Medical Oncology at the Pitié-Salpêtrière Hospital since 1990, he is also Professor of oncology at the University Pierre and Marie Curie and adjunct professor at the MD Anderson Cancer Center in Houston, Texas. He was elected at the American Society of Clinical Oncology board in 2013. Organiser of the World Summit against Cancer at the UNESCO, he initiated the Charter of Paris against Cancer and headed the French Cancer National Institute between April 2004 and September 2006. He is its Honorary President now. Khayat is the founder and the president of the Foundation AVEC, a non-profit organisation declared of public utility since 2013 (dissolved in 2020) . He also became a consultant for various industries in the 2010s; in particular, he is paid by Philip Morris International for a lobbying activity in favor of heated tobacco product.

== Education ==
David Khayat made his medical studies at the University of Nice from 1974 to 1980. Over the next five years he undertook internship and residency training at hospitals in Paris, and moved towards the field of oncology.

Later, during his formal studies in oncology, he attained a Master of Science in tumor immunology. Part of these studies were conducted in Israel with Professor Isaac Witz, at the University of Tel Aviv. Then, back to France in 1985, he finished his training in medical oncology and got his MD and became board certified in oncology the same year.

In 1986, David Khayat went to the Mount Sinaï school medicine in New York (Department of Biochemistry, J.C Unkeless) and got his Ph.D. in tumor immunology in 1988 at the University Pierre and Marie Curie in Paris. During his Ph.D., he has been working on the identification and purification of the soluble Fc receptors both, in mouse and human sera, and set up a new ELISA sandwich assay for the detection and the quantitive dosage of this soluble molecule. He demonstrated the relationship between the release of this soluble receptor in human serum (called also immunoglobulin binding factors IBF) and different pathologic conditions (AIDS, ITP ...).

== Career ==
Professor Khayat landed an assistant professorial position at the Department of Medical Oncology at Pitié-Salpetrière, a teaching hospital in the Assistance Publique-Hôpitaux de Paris network, in 1985. He moved onto a full professorship at University Pierre and Marie Curie in 1989 after getting his PhD.

David Khayat returned to Pitié-Salpetrière in 1990 as Head of the Department of Medical Oncology. In this role, he developed a research laboratory that worked on tumor immunology and the pharmacokinetics of anti-cancer drugs.

In April 2004, Professor Khayat became the Founding President of Cancer National Institute (INCa). Since 2006, he is Honorary President of the INCa.

Professor Khayat is the president of the Foundation AVEC, a non-profit organisation which finances actions to improve the quality of life of cancer patients and research programmes.

Khayat serves as a professor emeritus for a number of educational institutes worldwide, including the Suzhou Institute for oncology, China, and Matsumoto University, Japan. He is also Adjunct Professor of Medicine of the Department of Breast Diseases at the MD Anderson Cancer Center, University of Texas, United States. He was elected at the American Society of Clinical Oncology board in 2013.

=== National oncology teaching program ===
Khayat has set up a national oncology teaching program for young French oncologists — the "Master of Excellence in Medicine in Oncology" (Master d'excellence en médecine oncologique). This program is aimed to allow participants to learn the necessary skills to become the future key opinion leaders in oncology and promote French oncology in the international community.

=== Social activities ===
Working to organise French oncologists, he formed the French Federation of Medical Oncologists (FFOM) in 1998. He was elected the Federation's first president and held this position until 2001. Along with Gabriel Hortobagyi, David Khayat organised the World Summit Against Cancer in 2000 and 2001, as well as the Charter of Paris against cancer in 2000. This text was firmed by French President Jacques Chirac and Koïchiro Matsuura, Director-General of the UNESCO.

Professor Khayat became a member of French President Jacques Chirac's "war on cancer plan"(Plan cancer) in July 2002, and was President of a high-level bilateral committee for Franco-Israeli cooperation.

David Khayat sits on several French, European and International Committees. He is steering committee member of the World Alliance of Cancer Research Organizations. He is an advisor to the LEED program at the Organization for Economic and Cooperative Development (OECD). He is the associate editor of the Journal of Clinical Oncology and Cancer and is a member of several other editorial boards.

Khayat is also the ambassador of the Republic of San Marino at UNESCO.

=== Lobbyist for the tobacco industry ===
An investigation by Stéphane Horel and Jérémie Baruch for Le Monde relates that David Khayat, capitalizing on his worldly knowledge, undertook in the 2010s a consulting activity with industrialists on risk reduction. He is notably paid by Philip Morris International for lobbying activities in favor of heated tobacco product, which Philip Morris International markets. In particular, he sought to influence public decisions in France (where senators indicate that they did not understand, at the time, that he was working for the tobacco company) and in Hong Kong.

== Research interests ==
David Khayat is an active researcher in oncology and clinical pharmacology, and has at least 500 peer-reviewed publications to his name.

Presently, he is employed at one of the few fully equipped research centers in France which is deeply involved in evaluation of new drugs and new targets for exploitation in treatment and diagnosis of cancer. He works on basic research on factors that can predict response to immunotherapy in melanoma patients, as well as the development of phase I and II studies to test anti-cancer agents that may be used to treat breast cancer, colorectal cancer, lung cancer and melanoma.

== Awards ==
Khayat received the American Association for Cancer Research public service award in 2000 and was also selected to receive the research grant from the Bristol Myers Squibb Foundation in 2000.

He is chevalier of the National Order of Merit, of the Legion of Honor, of the Order of Sainte Agathe, and the Academics Palms. He is Commander of the Order of the British Empire (CBE), Chevalier de l’ordre du Lion du Sénégal, and officer in the Russian order of the friendship between people.

== Personal life ==
Khayat is married and has three daughters, Julie, Barabara and Cécile. Khayat's wife is a former-pharmacist, and presently an art historian at the Louvre School in Paris.

Khayat is also an author of not only medical texts, but some medical thriller fiction.
