= Men's Health Network =

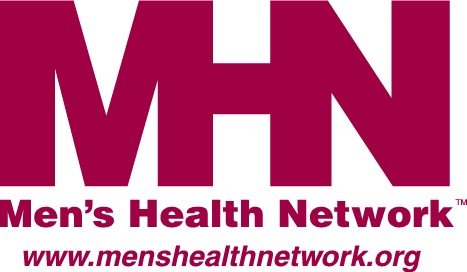
- Abbreviation: MHN
- Formation: 1995
- Type: 501(c)(3) non-profit educational organization
- Purpose: men's health and wellness
- Location: United States of America
- Executive Director, Tennessee Affiliate: Mike Leventhal
- Board of directors: Ronald K. Henry, (Chair), Mark Perry, Ph.D, Jerome Tokars, MD, Warren Farrell, Ph.D, Joseph DePasqualin, Derek Griffith
- Website: menshealthnetwork.org

Men's Health Network (MHN) is a non-profit international educational organization of health care professionals and interested individuals that focuses on improving male health and wellness. MHN has since been classified as a tax-exempt entity under Section 501(c)(3) of the U.S. Internal Revenue Service code.

MHN is based in the United States and is incorporated in the District of Columbia.

== Networks ==
In 1994, MHN provided the impetus for Men's Health Week in the week leading up to and including Father's Day and Men's Health Month (June), typical events include educational lectures by sports figures, free health screenings, and health fairs.

The organization also offers health information online through digital libraries, directories, free screening calendars, and websites such as www.checkmensfacts.com and as over the phone through Men’s Healthline.

== Executives ==
- Ana Fadich - Vice President
- Mike Leventhal - Executive Director of Tennessee Affiliate
- Judy Seals-Togbo - Manager, Faith-based Initiatives and Minority Health Programs
- Ramon Llamas - External Relations and Strategic Partnerships, and Minority Health Initiatives
- Ronald K. Henry - Board of Directors Chair

== See also ==
- Men's Health Forum
