= International Men's Health Week =

Event focused on issues facing men's health

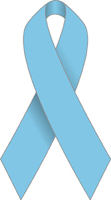
Prostate Cancer Awareness Ribbon

International Men's Health Week (IMHW) is an international week celebrated in several countries the week preceding and including Father's Day to focus on issues facing men's health. International Men's Health Week began at an international level in 2002 when representatives from six men's health organizations around the world met in a meeting organized by Men's Health Network at the 2nd World Congress on Men's Health in Vienna, Austria, and resolved to work together to launch IMHW. This meeting followed preliminary discussions in 2001, at the first World Congress on Men's Health, about the need to coordinate awareness periods around the globe.

Observers of IMHW are sometimes seen wearing a blue ribbon as a symbol of their support for the fight against prostate cancer. However, problems affecting men's health extend far beyond prostate cancer and other commonly recognized men's illnesses. Physicians and men's health activists mark IMHW with awareness campaigns to highlight additional health concerns such as diabetes, osteoporosis, family health, workplace accidents, and men's higher likelihood of suicide or being a victim of homicide.

== Vienna Declaration ==
The European Men's Health Forum returned to Austria in 2005 to create the Vienna Declaration which serves as a plan of action for improving the state of men's health. According to the Society for Men's Health and Gender, the five main points of the Vienna Declaration are:

- Recognizing men's health is a critical issue and that there are health issues which only affect men
- Promoting awareness of men's approach to health
- Changing the way health care is provided to be more sensitive towards men's needs
- Creating school and community programs which target boys and young men
- Connecting health and social policies to better pursue men's health goals

== Participants ==
The aim of IMHW is slightly wider than its domestic equivalent, aiming to increase awareness of general male health issues and to encourage inter- and intra-national institutions to provide better care for health issues affecting men around the world. Some affiliates of IMHW include The Men's Health Forum in England and Wales, Men's Health Society of BC, in British Columbia, Rotary International, the San Maarten Public Health Department in the Netherlands Antilles, the Men's Health Information and Resource Centre in Australia and Men's Health Network in the United States and other countries.

Although IMHW is most widely observed in Australia, Canada, Europe, and the United States, there has been collaboration with reproductive and sexual health programs for men in Central and South America, Africa, and Asia as well.

Because men's health is still an emerging issue, IMHW has been helpful in bringing awareness of the issue to areas where men's health has yet to become accepted. Countries in which men's health has come to be viewed as a more legitimate concern have collaborated with men's health activists elsewhere.

=== International Men's Health Week Activities ===
- Australia: Men's Health Information and Resource Centre Men's Health Week campaign of events and resources
- Austria: Hospitals offered free health screenings and restaurants offered healthy selections
- Canada: The Men's Health Society of British Columbia organized a picnic, open house, and athletic event
- Denmark: Symposium on Men's Health
- England, Scotland and Wales: Events made by a coalition of related organizations
- Netherlands - Antilles: A variety of events
- United States: Work place health screenings & educational events, lectures by athletes, public awareness campaigns, and social media engagement. The official Wear Blue Day is the Friday of Men's Health Week.

== History ==
=== Men's Health Week ===
Men's Health Week

Men's Health Week, celebrated annually during the week preceding and including Father's Day, honors the importance of men's health and wellness. Men's Health Week was chosen for this specific time of year to make use of the extra attention paid to male family members near the holiday. Observing Men's Health Week is meant to educate the public about what can be done to improve the state of men's health and provide free and convenient health services to men who wouldn't otherwise receive such care.

Men's Health Week was created by Congress in 1994 to heighten awareness of preventable health problems and encourage early detection and treatment of disease among men and boys. The bills creating Men's Health Week were sponsored by former Senator Bob Dole and former Congressman Bill Richardson. The sponsors cited the cost-effectiveness of a shift from treatment to prevention in health care emphasis when presenting the bill. The supporters of Men's Health Week also noted that prevention requires public awareness and designating a week would spread information on preventing illnesses affecting men, which includes nationwide events and screenings. "I especially thank Jimmy Boyd of the men's health network for ... tireless efforts on behalf of this legislation," Congressman Bill Richardson (NM), upon Congressional passage of Men's Health Week in 1994.{Congressional Record, May 24, 1994}

The governors of the states and territories in the USA have adopted the week, as have the mayors of many of the major cities. The proclamations are display on the Men's Health Month / Men's Health Week website. Typical Men's Health Week events include educational lectures by sports figures, free health screenings, health fairs, and seminars. Men's Health Week events are planned so that they are easily attended even by men with a full work schedule. Things to do can be found on the official Men's Health Month website. Although not officially recognized by Congress, men's health activists observe Men's Health Month throughout June.

=== Internationalization ===
Men's Health Week expanded to an international level when representatives from six men's health organizations around the world met at the 2nd World Congress on Men's Health in Vienna, Austria in 2002 and resolved to work together to launch International Men's Health Week (IMHW). The aim of IMHW is slightly wider than its domestic equivalent, aiming to increase awareness of general male health issues and to encourage inter- and intra-national institutions to provide better care for health issues affecting men around the world. Some affiliates of IMHW include Men's Health Forum in England and Wales, The Men's Health Forum Scotland (MHFS), Men's Health Network (USA and other countries), Australasian Men's Health Forum and Men's Health Society of BC, in British Columbia, Rotary International, and the San Maarten Public Health Department in the Netherlands Antilles.

=== Wear BLUE for Men's Health ===
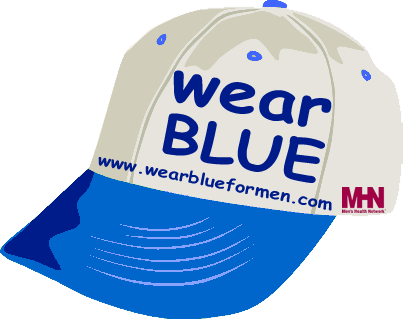
Wear blue for men's health cap

Friday of Men's Health Week has been officially named Wear BLUE Day for the week. Organizations and individuals can host a Wear BLUE day to raise awareness and money for education about men's need to seek regular checkups, or testicular cancer education, prostate cancer education, or other health issues that affect men. (Cardiovascular disease, skin cancer, lung cancer, diabetes, gout, and more.) Wear BLUE was created by Ana Fadich-Tomsic, MPH, CHES of Men's Health Network to raise awareness about the importance of male health and to encourage men to live longer and healthier lives. Many people take advantage of less stringent work attire to show their support of men's health by wearing blue. The social media hashtag has #ShowUsYourBlue has grown over the years

=== Blue Monday ===
Blue Monday is the official kickoff for National Men's Health Week, proclaimed by President Clinton in 1994. Created by Dr. Michael Lutz from the Michigan Institute of Urology nonprofit Men's Health Foundation, Blue Monday was first recognized in 2015 by the Michigan Senate designating Blue Monday as the kickoff for Men's Health Week. The bipartisan resolution proclaims "Blue Monday" as a day to kick off Men's Health Week and promote men's health engagement, education and advocacy. One in seven men are diagnosed with prostate cancer and 1 in 38 will die, even though prostate cancer is 100% curable when caught early. The goal of Blue Monday is to create awareness of men's health issues worldwide and to save lives. The first Blue Monday, June 15, 2015, was recognized and promoted in Michigan, Kentucky, Ohio, Wisconsin, Canada, and Florida. Blue Monday continues to grow each year and the Men's Health Foundation has partnered with the nonprofit Men's Health Initiative and together they are working to achieve international recognition for Blue Monday.

== See also ==
- International Men's Day
- Men's World Day
