= International Day of Epidemic Preparedness =

Observance day by the UN

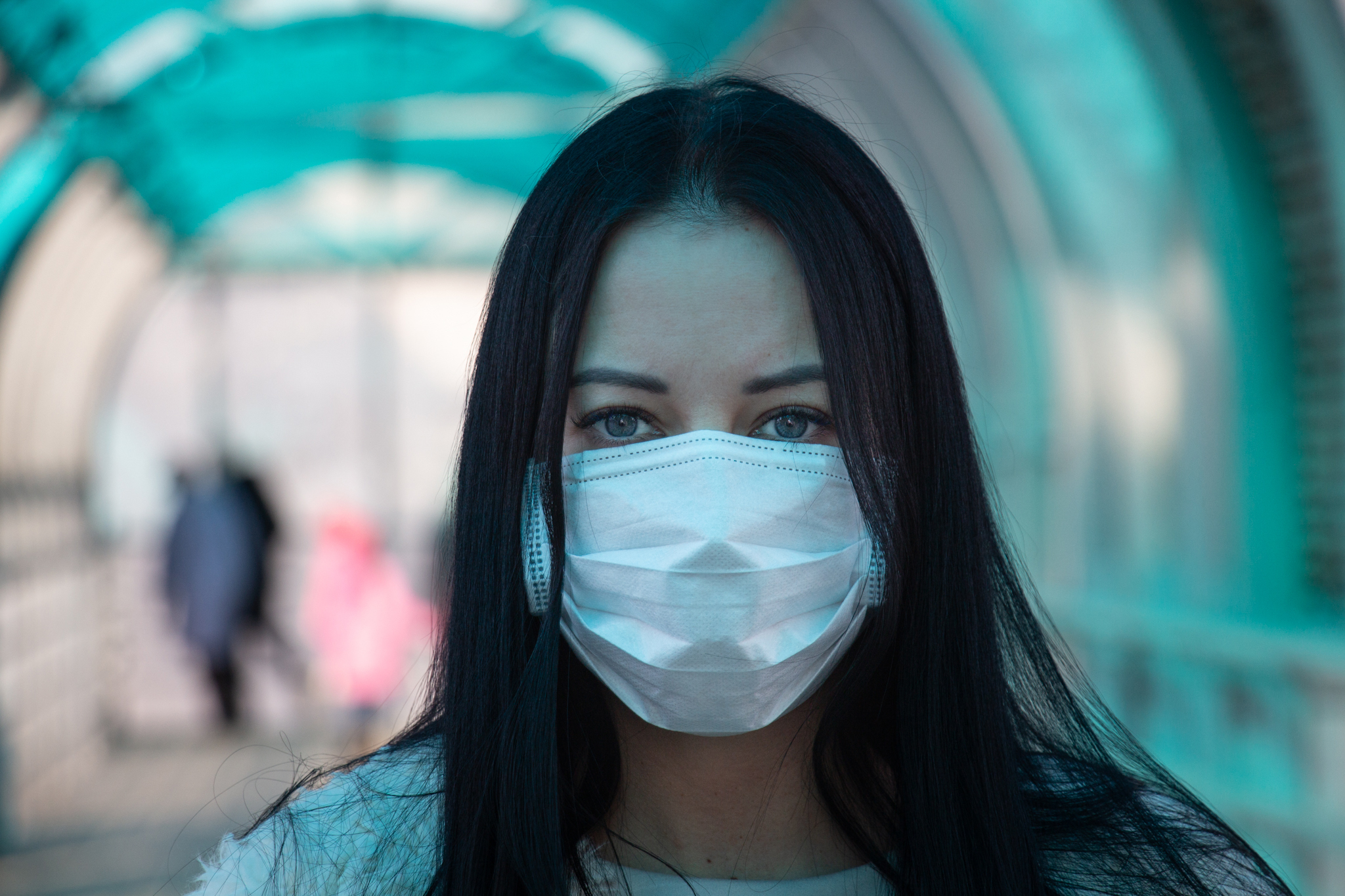
- Girl in mask (by www.vperemen.com)
- Observed by: UN Members
- Begins: 2020
- Date: 27 December
- Next time: 27 December 2026
- Frequency: annual

The International Day of Epidemic Preparedness is an international day that encourages every individual, every institution and every government to observe the International Day annually "... in an appropriate manner and in accordance with national contexts and priorities, through education and awareness-raising activities, in order to highlight the importance of the prevention of, preparedness for and partnership against epidemics".

The United Nations General Assembly designated December 27 as the International Day of Epidemic Preparedness in its Resolution on December 7, 2020.

The impuls for designating a specific day to this topic obviously was the experience with the unending and still uncontained coronavirus COVID-19 epidemic. The World Health Organization, as well as the governments and leaders around the world have realized, that "There is an urgent need to have resilient and robust health systems, reaching those who are vulnerable or in vulnerable situations." And specifically, that "There is great need of raising awareness, the exchange of information, scientific knowledge and best practices, quality education, and advocacy programmes on epidemics at the local, national, regional and global levels as effective measures to prevent and respond to epidemics."

Many countries and regions welcome the extra attention which observance of this International Day can bring to their efforts to not only contain the epidemic of COVID-19, but to improve their response capabilities going forward, so they are better equipped for future challenges.

== See also ==
- World Health Organization
- World Health Observances
