= John Chisholm (doctor) =

British medical doctor

John William Chisholm CBE FRCGP is a British medical doctor who worked as a general practitioner (GP). Chisholm was chairman of the British Medical Association's General Practitioners' Committee (GPC) between 1997 and 2007.

== Early life ==
Chisholm was educated at Clifton College, Bristol. He studied at Peterhouse College at the University of Cambridge, and Westminster Hospital Medical School.

== Career ==
Chisholm is a GP in Twyford, Berkshire.

He became a member of the GP committee of the BMA in 1977, then was elected joint deputy chair in 1991 which he held until being elected chair in 1997.

He is a member of BMA's council. He was a vice-president of the BMA. He was the lead negotiator for the 2004 GP contract.

He was a Council Trustee for the Royal College of General Practitioners, having been a member of the RCGP's council for more than fourteen years. He was the chair of the Men's Health Forum, then a trustee. He was the chair of the BMA's Medical Ethics Committee.

== Honours and awards ==
He was awarded a Commander of the Most Excellent Order of the British Empire (CBE) in the Queen's Birthday honours in 2000.
