= World Leprosy Day =

International observance

World Leprosy Day is observed internationally every year on the last Sunday of January to increase the public awareness of leprosy or Hansen's Disease. This date was chosen by French humanitarian Raoul Follereau as a tribute to the life of Mahatma Gandhi who had compassion for people afflicted with leprosy. The day began to be observed in 1954.

Leprosy is one of the oldest recorded diseases in the world. It is an infectious chronic disease that targets the nervous system, especially the nerves in the cooler parts of the body: the hands, feet, and face. Pope Francis has spoken in support of the observation.

== See also ==
- World Health Observances
