= National Prostate Health Month =

Annual health campaign

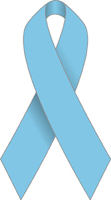
A light blue ribbon is the symbol for prostate cancer

National Prostate Health Month (NPHM), also known as National Prostate Cancer Awareness Month, is observed every September in North America by health experts, health advocates, and individuals concerned with men's prostate health and prostate cancer. Designating a month for the issue serves the purpose of:

- Increasing public awareness of the importance of prostate health and prostate cancer awareness
- Providing easily accessible prostate health screenings and prostate cancer screenings
- Educating about risk factors and symptoms of prostate health and prostate cancer
- Advocating for further research on prostate health issues and prostate cancer

== Origins ==
September was first designated National Prostate Health Month by the American Foundation for Urological Disease (AFUD) in 1999. AFUD is now known as the Urology Care Foundation. Originally the aims of observing NPHM were more proscribed, concentrating on making the public better informed about prostate health issues

In 2001, Senate Resolution 138 sponsored by Sen. Conrad Burns (R-MT) endorsed the week and affirmed that Prostate Health Month would be observed annually. In a 2003 presidential proclamation, President George W. Bush voiced his support for the month, but instead of designating the month to be for prostate health in general, specifically named the month "National Prostate Cancer Awareness Month".

September 2015 was designated National Prostate Cancer Awareness Month by the Obama administration.

== Related observances ==
In 1989, a decade before the creation of National Prostate Health Month, the week of September 17 to September 24 was chosen as Prostate Cancer Awareness Week. After the creation of NPHM, September came to incorporate observances of other related health weeks. Prostatitis Awareness Week is observed from September 10 to September 16 and Benign prostatic hyperplasia (BPH) Awareness Week is observed from September 24 to September 30. However, not all men's health issues are commemorated in September. Testicular Cancer Awareness Week, for example, is celebrated during the week of April 1 to April 7.

- 9/10 – 9/16: Prostatitis Week
- 9/17 – 9/24: Prostate Cancer Week
- 9/24 – 9/30: Benign Prostatic Hyperplasia Week
- 4/1 – 4/7: Testicular Cancer Awareness Week

== Events ==
Oncology funds, health systems, medical centers, and NGOs, such as Men's Health Network, are just a few of the US organizations that sponsor events during National Prostate Health Month. Free screenings for prostate-related diseases are offered at hospitals, health centers, and the workplace. Physicians are sent information on how NPHW can be used as a way to remind their patients about prostate health. The Prostate Cancer Education Council uses the popularity of sports to spread awareness of prostate health effects and resources. For example, NFL teams dedicate home games to prostate cancer awareness, and golf tournaments and 5k races distribute informational material to audiences and participants in exchange for the incentive of prizes.

== Sources ==
- "Prostate Cancer Awareness Month". www.prostatehealthguide.com. 20 August 2015.
- "Prostate Cancer Awareness Month is about Being Aware and Informed".
