= William Wales (optician) =

English-American optical instrument inventor (1838–1907)

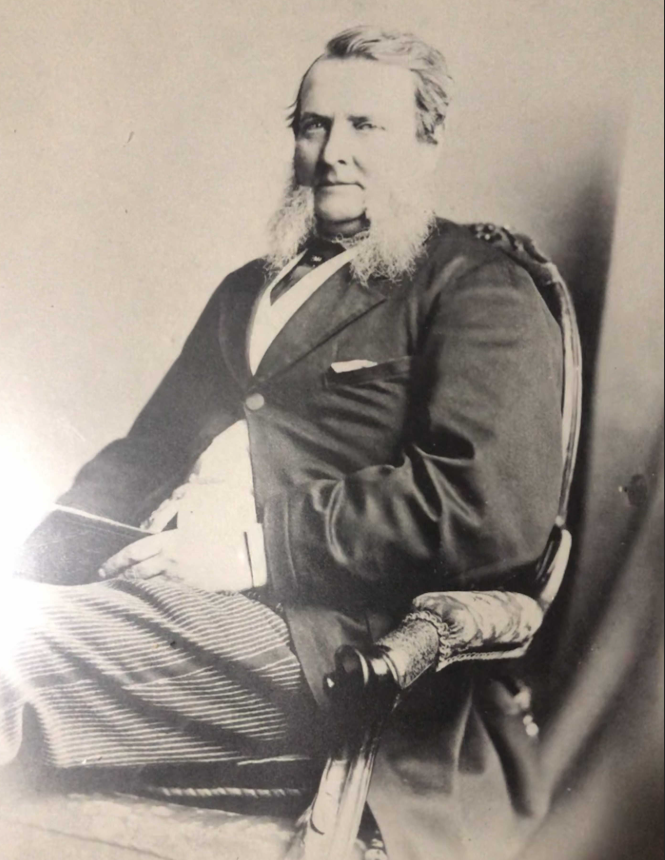
- William Wales, c. 1900
- Born: August 13, 1838; Hackney, Middlesex, England
- Died: September 15, 1907; Englewood, New Jersey, United States
- Occupations: Objective lens manufacturer and inventor
- Years active: 1855-1907

William Wales (August 13, 1838 – September 15, 1907) was an English-American optical instrument inventor specializing in the manufacture of objectives for use in microscopes. Wales's objective inventions were used frequently in contemporary microscopes and many examples survive in private and museum collections today.

== Early life ==
William Wales was born on August 13, 1838, to parents Richard Wales, who was born in Hunstanton, and Honour Lapthorne Smith who was born in London. He was born and baptized within the parish of Hackney, London. He was the eldest son and one of eight children born to Richard and Honour.

== Career ==
Wales was first employed with the London-based optics firm Smith & Beck. There, he ground lenses for use in microscopes. He immigrated to the United States from England in 1862, settling in Fort Lee, New Jersey, and quickly opened his own business manufacturing objectives. In 1864, Wales entered a partnership with W. H. Bulloch under the name William Wales & Co., although this dissolved in 1866 when Bulloch moved to Chicago.

Although he did not manufacture microscopes as a whole device, Wales's optics were used frequently in microscopes sold across the United States. Wales assisted with John Leonard Riddell's invention of the monobjective binocular microscope, constructing the objective in such a way that it could illuminate itself rather than needing to be separately lit.

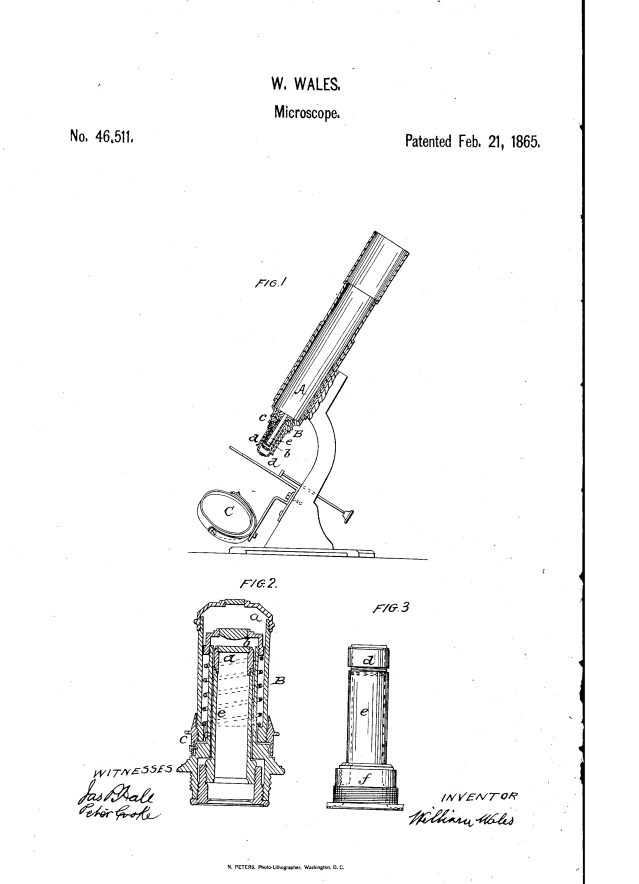
"Improvement in Microscopes" patent awarded to William Wales.

On February 21, 1865, Wales filed an application for a patent on a microscope. This invention used two or more oblique lenses that could allow natural light to pass through; previous microscopes had to be manually shifted to accommodate lighting.

In 1876, Wales was awarded the Centennial Award, a medal given to him at The Centennial Exposition of 1876, in Philadelphia. He won this medal alongside fellow inventor Alexander Graham Bell, who won the award for the invention of the Telephone. Some notable attendees of the event was the then aspiring inventor Thomas Edison, then President Ulysses S. Grant, social reformist Susan B. Anthony, and Emperor Dom Pedro II of Brazil.

Wales was also involved in the Grand Lodge of Good Templars and was elected to their New Jersey board in 1878.

On October 18, 1889, he was elected President of the New-York Microscopical Society pro tempore and continued to be on its committee on admissions between 1889 and 1891.

== Personal life ==
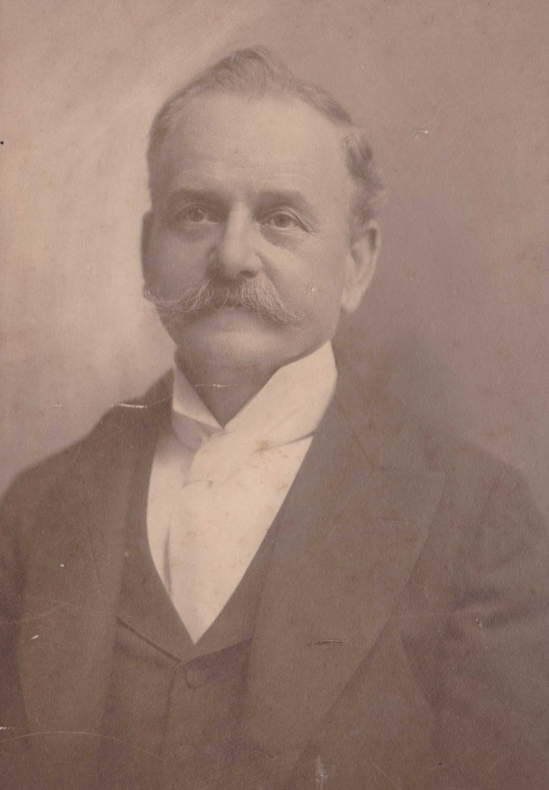
William Wales, c. 1905.

He was first married to Mary Emma Angus, in London around 1859. With Mary, he had five children, one of whom was born in England. He arrived to the United States with his wife and first-born son on July 12, 1862, on the steamship the SS Great Eastern. He first settled in Fort Lee, and had four more children, of whom three were born in Hackensack and one of whom was born in Leonia. In the late 1870s, and into the early 1880s, the family was living in New York City. He returned to New Jersey by 1885, settling in Leonia. His first wife died in 1900, and around 1903 he married Sarah Florence Powell, born Sarah Ann Sewell, an English-born woman who had immigrated in 1902. William was 28 years her senior. When William was 66, he had a son with Sarah, Edward, who was born on August 22, 1904, in Leonia. William lived in Leonia until his death in 1907.

== Death ==
On September 13, 1907, Wales and his family returned home to Leonia, New Jersey, after a trip to Europe. That night, Wales attempted suicide by cutting his wrist and throat and was discovered by his wife. He was transported to the hospital in Englewood, where he died of his injuries on the afternoon of September 15. The New York Times cited "insane jealousy" over his wife as his motive, although Wales himself did not provide a reason before his death. Wales was survived by his second wife and four children.

== Legacy ==
Contemporary microscopists regarded Wales's objectives as exemplary. One early edition of The American Naturalist described his inventions, "With no equal power of Powell & Leland's of London, of Hartnack of Paris, of Tolles & Grunow of this country, or of Gundlach of Vienna, various objectives of each and all of which makers I have examined, have either, I myself, or other microscopists of my acquaintance been able to effect this".

Microscopes that include objectives supplied by Wales are in collections at various institutions, including Harvard University, East Carolina University, and the United States Army Medical Museum.

== Publications ==
- Wales, William (1885). "The Proper Care and Use of Microscope Lenses". Journal of the New-York Microscopical Society. 1 (5). New-York Microscopical Society: 113–116 – via Google Books.
- Wales, William (1892). "C. A. Spencer's Use of Fluorite in 1891". Journal of the New York Microscopical Society. 8 (20). New York Microscopical Society.
