= List of ambassadors of Hungary to the United Kingdom =

This is a list of the heads of mission from Hungary to the Court of St James's in London.

== Ambassadors from the Kingdom of Hungary ==
=== Charge d'affaires ===
- 1921-1922: István Hedry

=== Envoy extraordinary ===
- 1922-1924: Count László Szapáry
- 1924-1932: Baron Iván Rubido-Zichy
- 1933-1935: Count László Széchenyi
- 1936-1938: Szilárd Masirevich
- 1938-1941: György Barcza

After the Invasion of Yugoslavia, the diplomatic relations were interrupted by the United Kingdom on 7 April 1941, which were only recovered after the Paris Peace.

== Ambassadors from the People's Republic of Hungary ==
=== Envoy extraordinary ===
- 1947-1948: István Bede
- 1948-1949: János Erőss
- 1949-1951: Elek Bolgár
- 1951-1953: Imre Horváth
- 1953-1957: János Katona
- 1957-1959: Pál Földes
- 1959-1963: Béla Szilágyi

=== Ambassador extraordinary and plenipotentiary ===
- 1963-1969: Jenő Incze

=== Charge d'affaires ===
- 1969-1970: György Varsányi

=== Ambassador extraordinary and plenipotentiary ===
- 1970-1976: Vencel Házi
- 1976-1981: János N. Lőrincz
- 1981-1984: Rezső Bányász
- 1984-1989: Mátyás Domokos
- 1989-1990: Dr. József Györke

== Ambassadors from Hungary ==
=== Ambassador extraordinary and plenipotentiary ===
- 1990-1995: Tibor Antalpéter
- 1995-1997: Tádé Alföldy
- 1997-2002: Gábor Szentiványi
- 2002-2006: Béla Szombati
- 2007-2010: Borbála Czakó
- 2011-2014: János Csák
- 2014-2016: Péter Szabadhegy
- 2016-2020: Kristóf Szalay-Bobrovniczky
- 2020- : Ferenc Kumin

== See also ==
- List of diplomatic missions of Hungary
- List of ambassadors of the United Kingdom to Hungary
