= Tibor Antalpéter =

Hungarian diplomat and volleyball player

Hungarian Ambassador to the United Kingdom
- In office 1990–1995
- Preceded by: József Györke
- Succeeded by: Tádé Alföldy

Personal details
- Born: February 4, 1930 Budapest, Hungary
- Died: September 15, 2012 (aged 82)
- Spouse: Adél Mátha
- Children: Katalin; Sára
- Parent(s): István Antalpéter; Viktória Dobai
- Education: Calvinist Grammar School (Budapest); Karl Marx University
- Occupation: economist
- Profession: volleyball player

Tibor Antalpéter (4 February 1930 – 15 September 2012) was a Hungarian volleyball player who played for Csepel SC and the Hungarian national team. He served as Hungarian Ambassador to the United Kingdom from 1990 to 1995.

== Biography ==
He was born in Budapest on 4 February 1930. His parents were István Antalpéter and Viktória Dobai. He married Adél Mátha in 1956. They had two daughters: Katalin (b. 1958) and Sára (b. 1961).

He finished his secondary studies at the Calvinist Grammar School in Budapest. He graduated from the Karl Marx University of Economic Sciences in 1954.

=== Sports career ===
Antalpéter was a player of the Csepel SC from 1948 to 1960. He competed at the FIVB Men's Volleyball World Championship in 1949 where the team reached a seventh place. His best result is a third place from the 1950 Men's European Volleyball Championship. Two years later, the national team became fifth in the 1952 FIVB Men's Volleyball World Championship. He appeared in 64 international matches for the Hungarian national team since making his debut in 1947 until 1956. He won the National Championship seven times.

He served as coach of the adult team of Csepel SC between 1960 and 1969 which won the National Championship twice. He was a Board Member of the Hungarian Volleyball Federation since 1966. He functioned as leader of the Coaches' Committee from 1966 to 1970. He served as Vice President (1970–1973) then President (1981–1986) of the Federation. He was also a member of the Hungarian Olympic Committee between 1980 and 1986.

Diplomatic posts
Preceded by József Györke	Hungarian Ambassador to the United Kingdom; 1990–1995	Succeeded by Tádé Alföldy
