= World Lymphoma Awareness Day =

International observance, 15 September

World Lymphoma Awareness Day (WLAD) is held on September 15 every year and is a day dedicated to raising awareness of lymphoma, an increasingly common form of cancer. It is a global initiative hosted by the Lymphoma Coalition (LC), a non-profit network organization of 83 lymphoma patient groups from 52 countries around the world. WLAD was initiated in 2004 to raise public awareness of both Hodgkin and non-Hodgkin lymphoma in terms of symptom recognition, early diagnosis and treatment.

Lymphoma is increasing in incidence and is a potentially life-threatening disease. One million people worldwide live with lymphoma and nearly 1,000 people are diagnosed with the disease every day, but there continues to be very little awareness of the signs and symptoms of lymphoma.

2008 Global Patient Survey shows that:

- When asked if they know their nodes, only half (49 percent) of people said they know what nodes do
- Although most respondents have heard of lymphoma, 52 percent of people know very little or nothing about it
- Two-thirds (67 percent) of respondents did not know lymphoma is a type of cancer and that it has one of the fastest growing incidence rates worldwide
- 90 percent of people do not think enough is being done to fund lymphoma research

Increasing awareness of lymphoma may contribute to improved recognition of its signs and symptoms, which can be associated with earlier diagnosis and treatment. It may also be linked to greater patient engagement with healthcare services, including access to specialist care and information about available treatment options.

== WLAD Campaigns ==
Know Your Nodes

Know Your Nodes is a public awareness campaign created with the insight that people know little about their lymphatic systems and, in turn, lymphoma. An international survey conducted in 2006 by the Lymphoma Coalition revealed that nearly three-quarters (74 per cent) of people did not know lymphoma was a type of cancer and less than half (49 per cent) knew anything about lymphoma at all. With this knowledge in mind, the Know Your Nodes campaign was created to take people back to the basics and learn more about their lymph nodes, lymphatic systems and lymphoma in time for WLAD.

Know Your Nodes engages people around the world in learning more about their lymph nodes, the lymphatic system, and the signs and symptoms of lymphoma. Lymphoma’s signs and symptoms can be similar to other, less serious illnesses, and increasing awareness of lymphoma will allow people around the world to better recognise its signs and symptoms, leading to earlier diagnosis and more timely treatment.

Beacons of Hope

The Beacons of Hope program was created in 2006 to celebrate inspiring people around the world that have been affected by lymphoma. Lymphoma Coalition members were asked to nominate individuals affected by lymphoma who acted as global Beacons of Hope ambassadors. The ambassadors spread the word of hope across the world, bringing real life experience to WLAD.

The Lymphoma Club

The Lymphoma Club was founded in 2010 to recognize those affected by all lymphomas (Hodgkin's and non-Hodgkin's lymphoma) and to help raise awareness for lymphoma.

== History ==
Since its launch in 2004, WLAD has made its mark internationally, from inspirational showcases of art in Argentina, to bike tours in France, and patient seminars in New Zealand. The global campaign continues to provide a platform for doctors, nurses, patient support groups, patients and their families to share vital knowledge about lymphoma, its signs and symptoms, and how it affects lives of thousands of people around the world.

In 2007, Lymphoma Coalition launched the Know Your Nodes campaign internationally to help people learn more about lymph nodes, the lymphatic system and lymphoma.

== About Lymphoma Coalition ==
Lymphoma Coalition is a non-profit network organization of lymphoma patient groups. Established in 2003, it is a global initiative dedicated to raising awareness of lymphoma, a common form of cancer, and promoting the well-being of people affected by lymphoma worldwide. Its mission is to:

- Be the global source for lymphoma facts and statistics
- Improve awareness and understanding of lymphomas
- Build capacity for new and existing lymphoma groups.

== Theme of the Year ==
- 2025: Honest Talk.
- 2024: It’s time for some Honest Talk about how we’re feeling.
- 2023: We Can't Wait to Focus on Our Feelings.
- 2022: We Can't Wait to address the ways the pandemic has affected people living with lymphomas.
- 2021: We Can't Wait.
- 2020: Focusing on Patients and their Gratitude.
- 2011: Know your Nodes.
