= Men's Health Forum =

British health charity

- Founded: 1994
- Type: Non-profit
- Headquarters: London, United Kingdom
- Website: www.menshealthforum.org.uk

Men's Health Forum is a charity based in Great Britain. Its mission is to improve the health of men and boys in England, Wales, and Scotland.

The Men's Health Forum was founded in 1994. It was set up by the Royal College of Nursing but became completely independent of the RCN when it was established as a registered charity in 2001. It is now an independent body with working with a wide range of individuals and organisations to develop health services that meet men's needs and enable men to change their risk-taking behaviours. It is a strategic partner of the Department of Health.

The Chief Executive is Martin Tod; and the chair of trustees is Dr John Chisholm. The world's first professor of men's health, Alan White from the Centre for Men's Health at Leeds Metropolitan University, is Patron.

It lobbies policy-makers and service commissioners, runs projects, carries out research, publishes reports and health information booklets and online information and coordinates Men’s Health Week in Great Britain.
