= World Patient Safety Day =

Annual observance

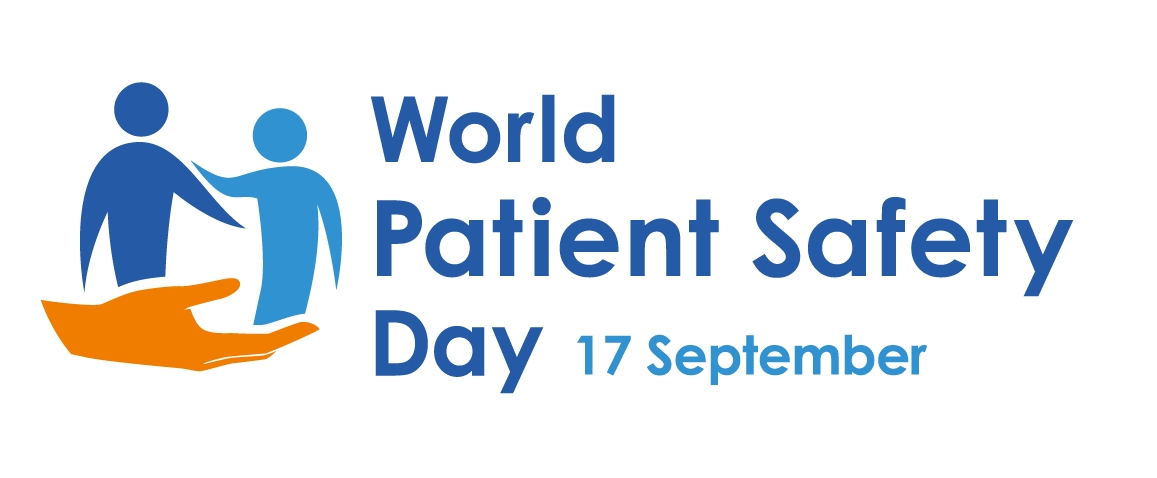
- Observed by: All Member States of the World Health Organization
- Date: 17 September
- Next time: 17 September 2027
- Frequency: annual
- Related to: WHO global health campaigns

World Patient Safety Day (WPSD), observed annually on 17 September, aims to raise global awareness about patient safety and call for solidarity and united action by all countries and international partners to reduce patient harm. Patient safety focuses on preventing and reducing risks, errors and harm that happen to patients during the provision of health care.

World Patient Safety Day is one of 11 official global public health campaigns marked by the World Health Organization (WHO), along with World Tuberculosis Day, World Health Day, World Chagas Disease Day, World Malaria Day, World Immunization Week, World No Tobacco Day, World Blood Donor Day, World Hepatitis Day, World Antimicrobial Awareness Week or World AMR (Anti-Microbial Resistant) Awareness Week, and World AIDS Day.

== Background ==
Patient safety is a health care discipline that emerged due to the growing complexity of health care systems and the rise of patient harm in health care facilities. Patient harm due to adverse events is one of the leading causes of morbidity and mortality worldwide. The available evidence suggests that hospitalization in low- and middle-income countries leads to 134 million adverse events annually, which in turn result in 2.6 million deaths. In high-income countries, approximately one in ten patients is harmed while receiving hospital care.

World Patient Safety Day was established in May 2019 when the 72nd World Health Assembly adopted resolution WHA 72.6 on ‘Global action on patient safety’. This global campaign builds on a series of annual Global Ministerial Summits on Patient Safety initiated in 2016, as well as the high-level advocacy and commitment of major international and national stakeholders.

== Themes ==
Each year is focused on a different theme.

=== 2026: Safe care for noncommunicable diseases ===
The 2026 theme comes with the slogan “Safe care for life!”, It calls for multisectoral and multi-stakeholder action to ensure that no one is harmed while receiving care for NCDs.

=== 2025: Safe care for every newborn and every child ===
The 2025 theme comes with the slogan “Patient safety from the start!”, recognizing the vulnerability of this age group to risks and harm caused by unsafe care.

=== 2024: Improving diagnosis for patient safety ===
The 2024 theme comes with the slogan “Get it right, make it safe!”, highlighting the critical importance of correct and timely diagnosis in ensuring patient safety and improving health outcomes.

=== 2023: Engaging Patients for Patient Safety ===
2023 WPSD Objectives were: (1) Raise global awareness of the need for active engagement of patients, families, and caregivers; (2) Engage policy-makers, health care leaders, health and care workers, patients’ organizations, civil society and other stakeholders in efforts to engage patients and families; (3) empower patients and families for active healthcare involvement and healthcare safety improvement; and (4) advocate urgent action on patient and family engagement, aligned with the Global Patient Safety Action Plan 2021–2030.

=== 2022: Medication Safety ===
Key action area foci for 2022 are high-risk situations, transitions of care, and polypharmacy.

=== 2021: Safe and Respectful Maternal and Newborn Care ===
WHO Patient Safety Flagship is organizing a Global Conference "Together for safe and respectful maternal and newborn care."

=== 2020: Health Worker Safety: A Priority for Patient Safety ===
"World Patient Safety Day 2020 focuses on the interrelationship between health worker safety and patient safety. The slogan, 'Safe health workers, Safe patients'", emphasizes the need for a safe working environment for health workers as a prerequisite for ensuring patient safety. Along with this slogan, WHO is proposing the following call for action: 'Speak up for health worker safety!'." Health Worker Safety Charter and World Patient Safety Day Goals 2020 were launched on 17 September 2020 to call for action to improve health worker safety globally.

=== 2019: Patient Safety: A Global Health Priority ===
"The theme for the very first World Patient Safety Day was ‘Patient Safety: A Global Health Priority’. To promote open communication for learning from errors and to emphasize the importance of everyone's voice in prioritizing patient safety, the slogan was 'Speak up for patient safety!'."

== Global Observation ==
A signature mark of the global campaign is the lighting up of prominent monuments, landmarks, and public places in the colour orange, in collaboration with local authorities.

== See also ==
- Patient safety
