= World Chagas Disease Day =

World awareness day

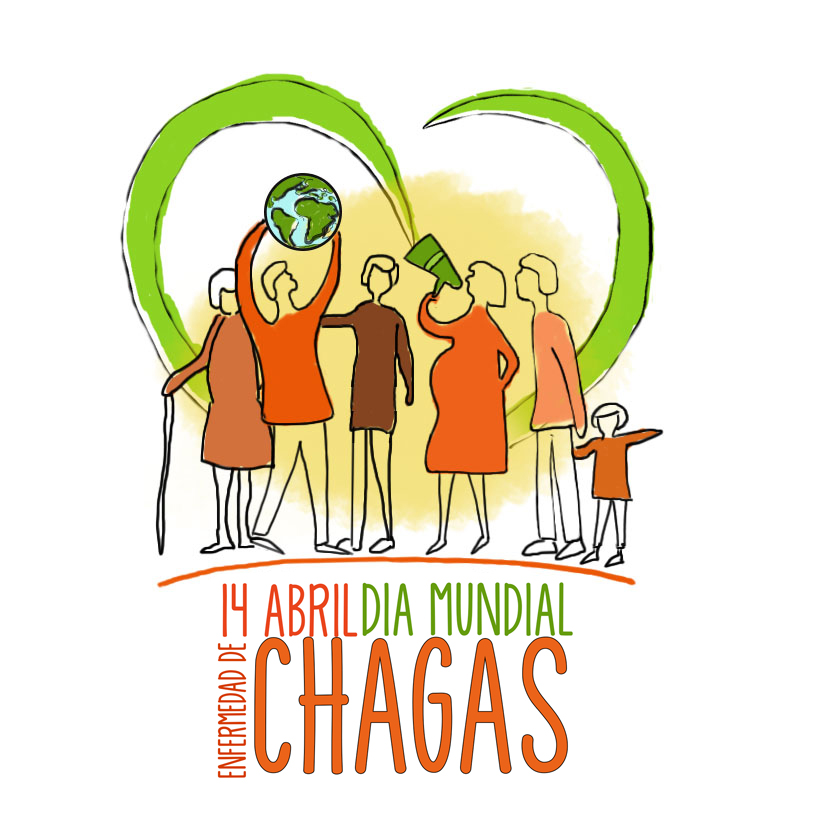
World Chagas Disease Day logo in Spanish

World Chagas Disease Day is observed on April 14 to raise awareness around Chagas disease, a neglected tropical disease present mostly in Latin America. It was first celebrated on April 14, 2020, and was named after Carlos Ribeiro Justiniano Chagas, the Brazilian doctor who diagnosed the first case on April 14, 1909. World Chagas Disease Day was approved for creation on May 24, 2019, at the 72nd session of the World Health Assembly, and officially created at the WHA plenary on May 28, 2019. The proposal for a World Chagas Disease Day was instituted by the International Federation of Associations of People Affected by Chagas Disease, and was supported by several health institutions, universities, research centres, organizations and foundations.

"An annual day celebrated at global level is bound to attract international attention," said Dr Pedro Albajar Viñas, WHO Medical Officer (Chagas disease). "These days can help to provide visibility and commit countries to enhance control interventions for a disease that has remained largely neglected, but still present in many countries." Celebrating World Chargas Disease Day provides a unique opportunity to express a voice in favor of this disease.

World Chagas Disease Day is one of 11 official global public health campaigns marked by the World Health Organization (WHO), along with World Tuberculosis Day, World Health Day, World Malaria Day, World Immunization Week, World No Tobacco Day, World Blood Donor Day, World Hepatitis Day, World Patient Safety Day, World Antimicrobial Awareness Week and World AIDS Day.
