= World Malaria Day =

International observance, 25 April

World Malaria day
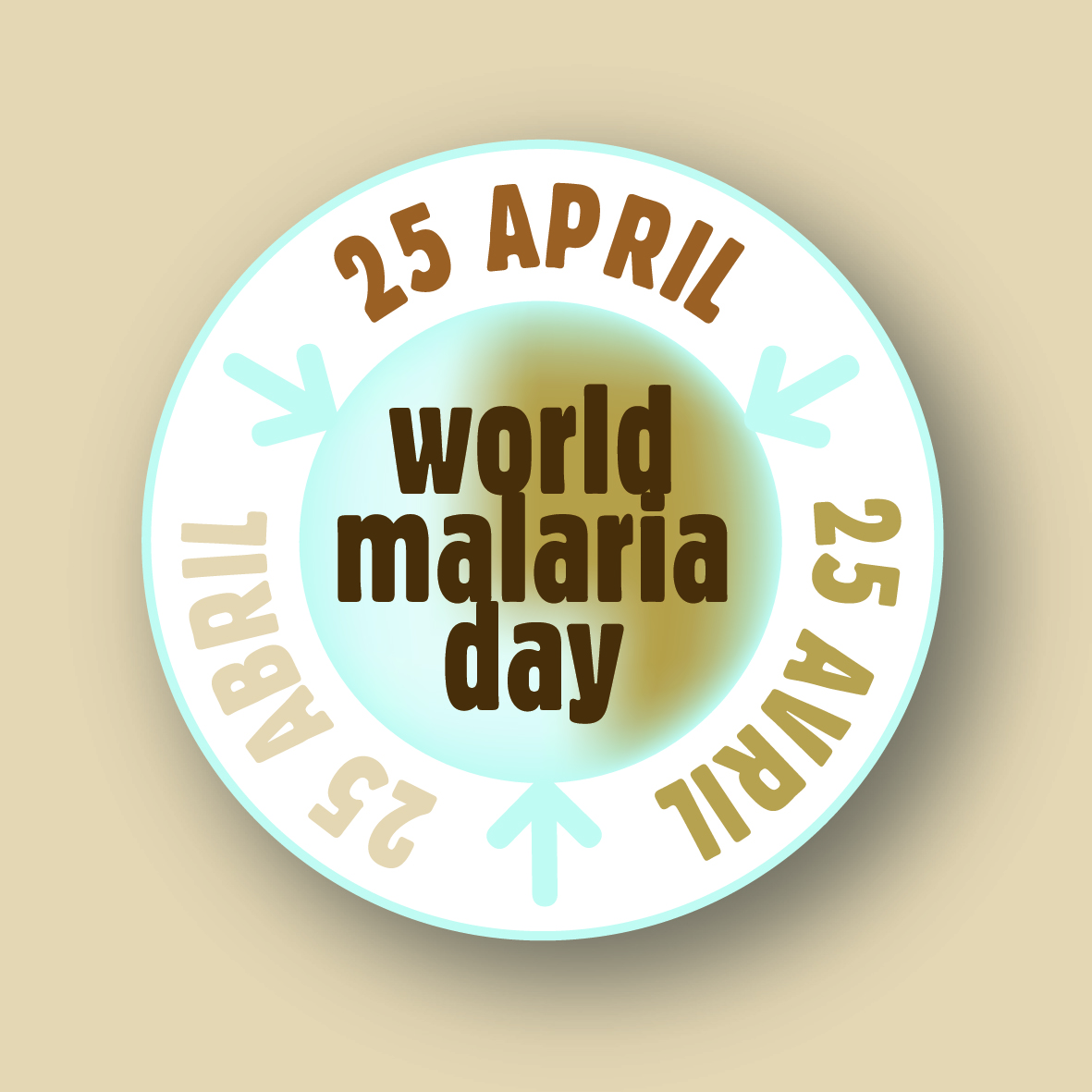
- Observed by: All Member States of the World Health Organization
- Date: April 25
- Next time: 25 April 2027
- Frequency: annual

World Malaria Day (WMD) is an international observance commemorated every year on 25 April to raise awareness and highlight the global efforts against malaria. Globally, 3.3 billion people in 106 countries are at risk of malaria. In 2012, malaria caused an estimated 627,000 deaths, mostly among African children. Asia, Latin America, and to a lesser extent the Middle East and parts of Europe are also affected.

World Malaria Day sprang out of the efforts taking place across the African continent to commemorate Africa Malaria Day. WMD is one of 11 official global public health campaigns currently marked by the World Health Organization (WHO), along with World Health Day, World Blood Donor Day, World Immunization Week, World Antimicrobial Awareness Week, World Patient Safety Day, World Tuberculosis Day, World Chagas Disease Day, World No Tobacco Day, World Hepatitis Day and World AIDS Day.

According to the most recent World Malaria Report, the global tally of malaria reached 429,000 malaria deaths and 212 million new cases in 2015. The rate of new malaria cases fell by 21 per cent globally between 2010 and 2015, and malaria death rates fell by 29 per cent in the same period. In sub-Saharan Africa, case incidence and death rates fell by 21 per cent and 31 per cent, respectively.

== History ==
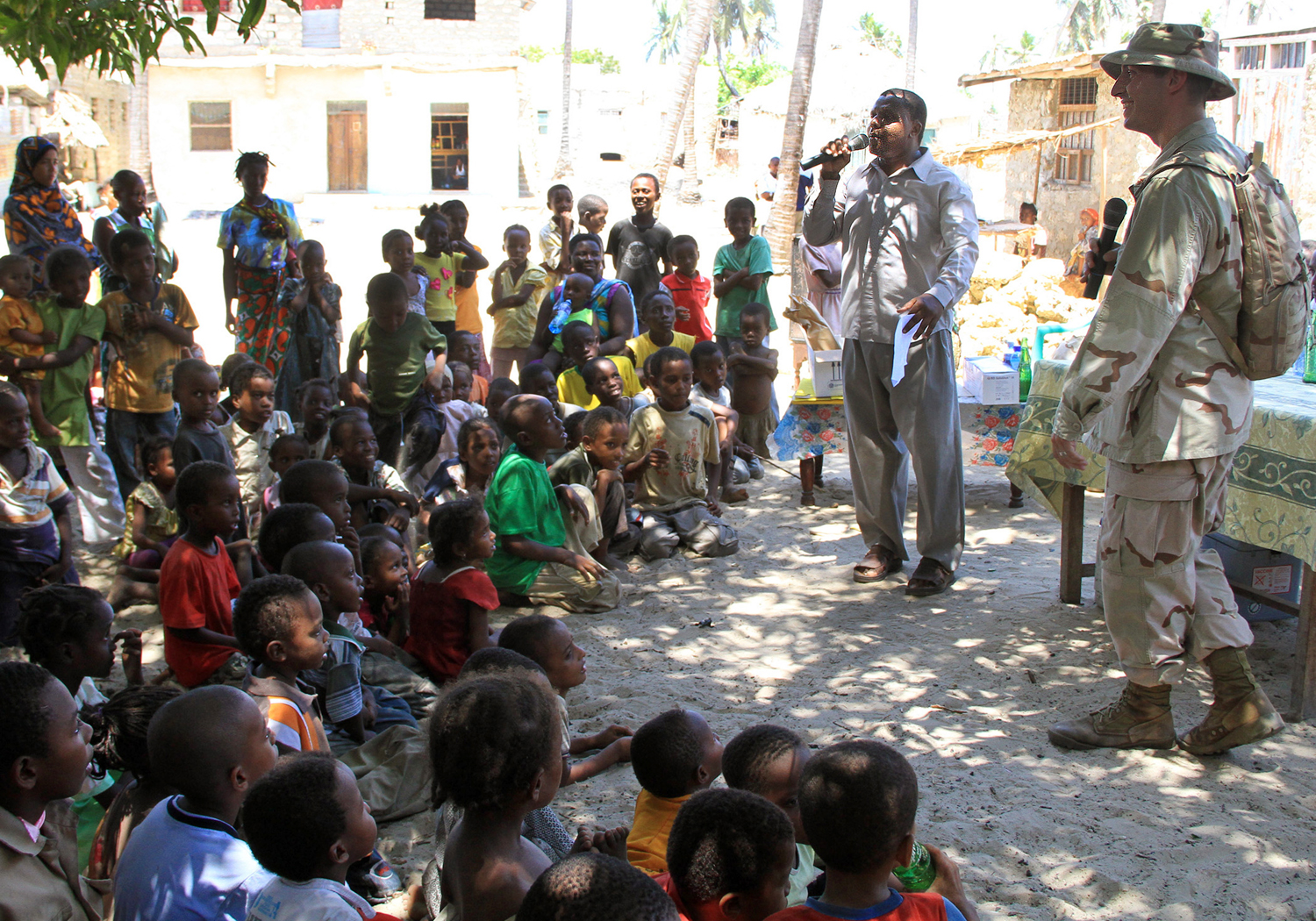
A World Malaria Day event in Lamu, Kenya in 2011

World Malaria Day was established in May 2007 by the 60th session of the World Health Assembly, WHO's decision-making body. The day was established to provide "education and understanding of malaria" and spread information on "year-long intensified implementation of national malaria-control strategies, including community-based activities for malaria prevention and treatment in endemic areas." Prior to the establishment of WMD, Africa Malaria Day was held on April 25. Africa Malaria Day began in 2001, one year after the historic Abuja Declaration was signed by 44 malaria-endemic countries at the African Summit on Malaria. World Malaria Day allows for corporations (such as ExxonMobil), multinational organizations (such as Malaria No More) and grassroots organizations (such as Mosquitoes Suck Tour) globally to work together to bring awareness to malaria and advocate for policy changes.

== Themes ==
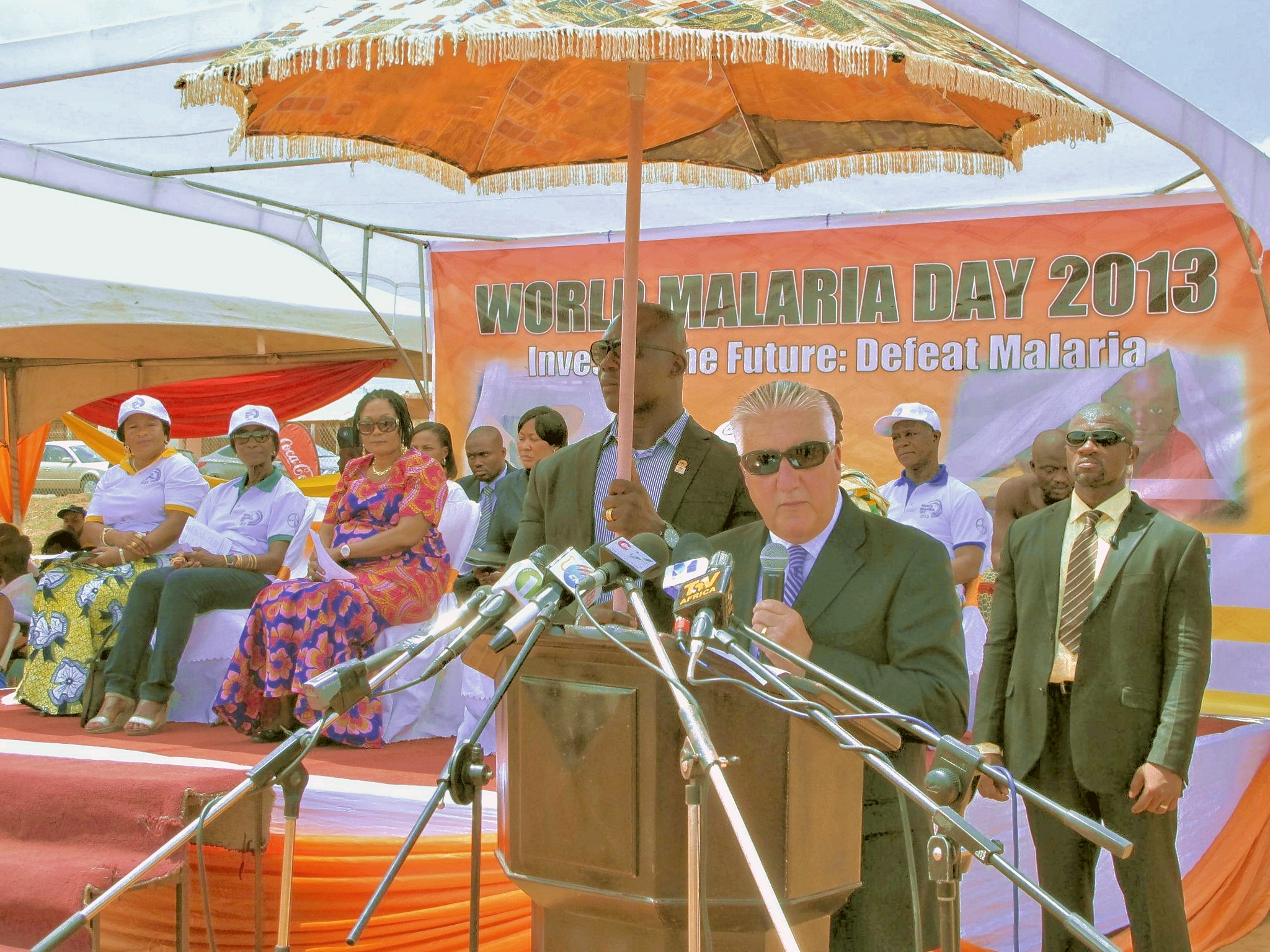
World Malaria Day in Adenta, Ghana, in 2013

Each World Malaria Day focuses on a specific theme. Current and past themes include the following:

- World Malaria Day 2026: "Driven to End Malaria: Now we can. Now we must."
- World Malaria Day 2025: "Malaria Ends with Us: Reinvest, Reimagine, Reignite"
- World Malaria Day 2024: "Accelerating the fight against malaria for a more equitable world",
- World Malaria Day 2023: “Time to deliver zero malaria: invest, innovate, implement”
- World Malaria Day 2022: "Harness innovation to reduce the malaria disease burden and save lives."
- World Malaria Day 2019-2020-2021: "Zero malaria starts with me"
- World Malaria Day 2018: "Ready to beat malaria"
- World Malaria Day 2017: "LETS Close The Gap"
- World Malaria Day 2016: "End Malaria For Good"
- World Malaria Day 2013-2014-2015: "Invest in the future: defeat malaria"
- World Malaria Day 2012: "Sustain Gains, Save Lives: Invest in Malaria"
- World Malaria Day 2011: "Achieving Progress and Impact"
- World Malaria Day 2009-2010: "Counting malaria out"
- World Malaria Day 2008: "Malaria: a disease without borders"

== Global Events ==
=== Europe ===
Leading to World Malaria Day 2014, the European Vaccine Initiative announced sixteen new projects for the acceleration of malaria vaccine development. The projects were to be undertaken by an international consortium involving partners from the public and private sectors from Europe, USA and Africa.

=== India ===
For World Malaria Day 2017, efforts across India included a series of measures to control the spread of this vector-borne disease. The coastal city of Mangaluru identified open water resources to target for eliminating mosquitos that spread malaria.

=== Nigeria ===
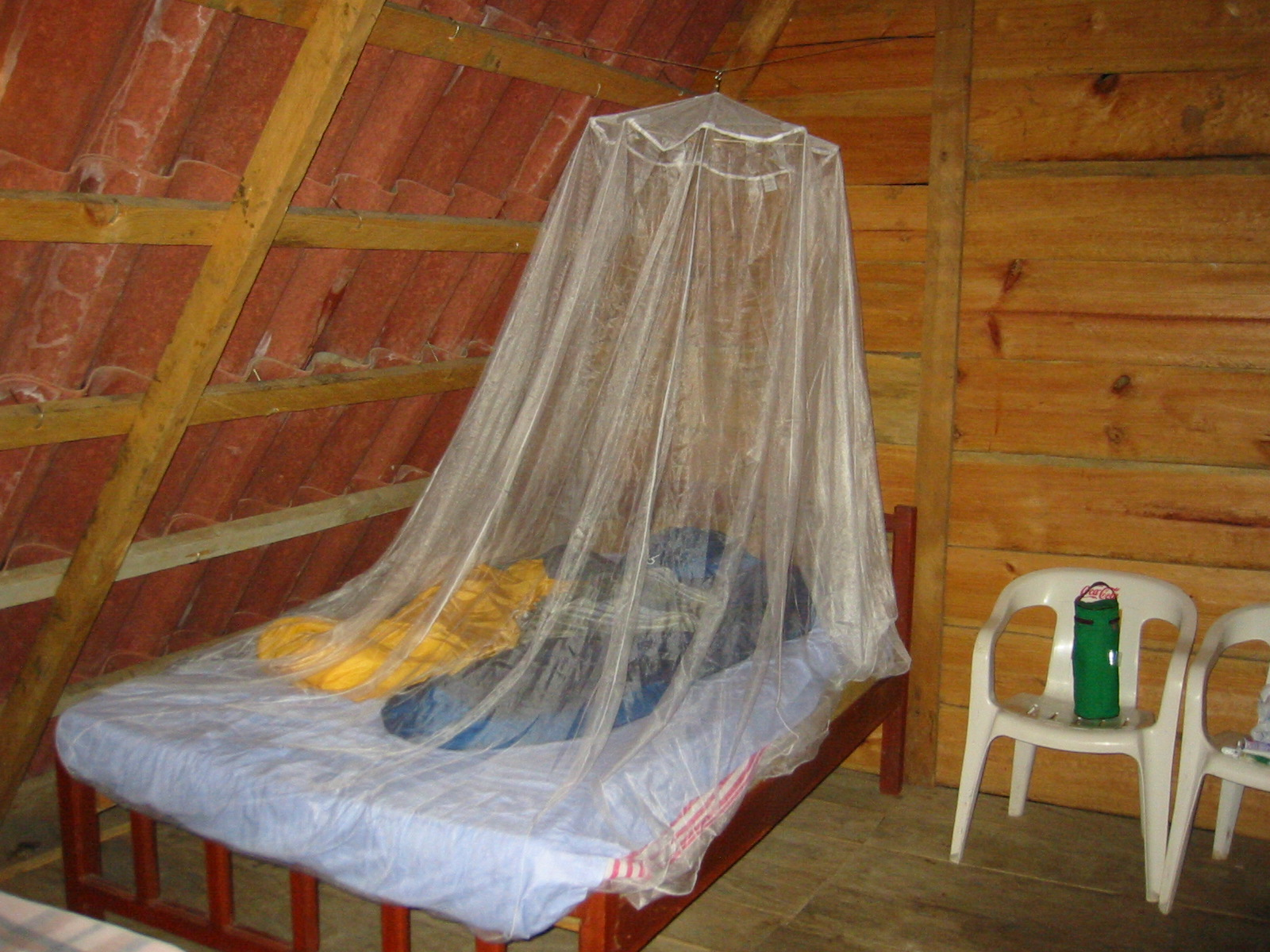
Ceiling hung mosquito netting

Events marking World Malaria Day 2014 in Nigeria included a demonstration of anti-malarial bed nets, testing and distribution of anti-malarial drugs, seminars on progress in combating and controlling malaria, and the inclusion of African footballers in the campaign to combat malaria.

As of 2016, the Federal Ministry of Health has pledged to end Malaria. The U.S. Ambassador to Nigeria, James F. Entwistle, has pledged continued support and noted the possibility of ending Malaria in Nigeria.

=== United States ===
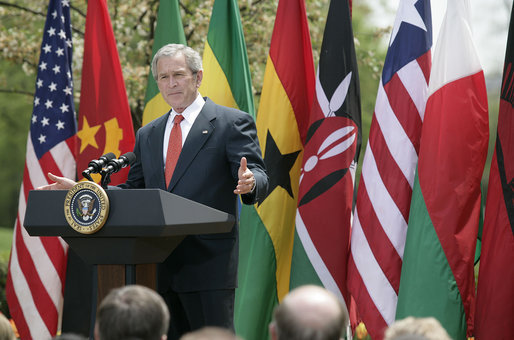
President Bush addresses Americans in The White House Rose Garden about the issues of malaria.

April 25 was designated as Malaria Awareness Day in 2007 by President George W. Bush, who called on Americans to join in on the goal to eradicate malaria on the African continent. President Bush described it as a day when "we focus our attention on all who suffer from this terrible disease -- especially the millions on the continent of Africa. We remember the millions more who died from this entirely preventable and treatable disease." President Bush shared the White House's strategic plan against malaria, which included endeavors to distribute bed nets with the New York-based nonprofit group Malaria No More.

Other former U.S. Presidents are involved in anti-malaria efforts. Former President Bill Clinton's Clinton Foundation includes an anti-malaria component that, according to director Inder Singh has distributed anti-malaria drugs to millions in Africa and Asia.

Many prominent companies, organizations, and celebrities have declared initiatives to join the fight against malaria to mark this day. These include a $3 million "challenge grant" announced by ExxonMobil to match donations dollar by dollar to Malaria No More, as part of the "Idol Gives Back" episodes of American Idol, which was aired on Malaria Awareness Day. Major League Soccer Commissioner Don Garber also announced that the league would promote malaria awareness and bed net fundraising promotions in the month of April leading up to Malaria Awareness Day. Actress Ashley Judd announced the April launch of a new initiative called "5 & Alive", which will focus on the devastating effects of malaria on children under 5. The Boys & Girls Clubs of America announced their own national campaign called "Malaria Prevention: Deadly Disease. Simple Solution", which will partner with Malaria No More to approach all 4.7 Million Club members worldwide to ask for $10 bed net donations.

The movement is not without its critics, such as the African economist Dambisa Moyo, who warns that the short term benefits of aid such as mosquito nets can have long term detrimental effects to the sustainability of African economies. When the markets are flooded with foreign nets then this puts African entrepreneurs out of business.

== See also ==
- Global Malaria Action Plan
- Malaria Day in the Americas
- World Mosquito Day
