= World No Tobacco Day =

International observance on 31 May

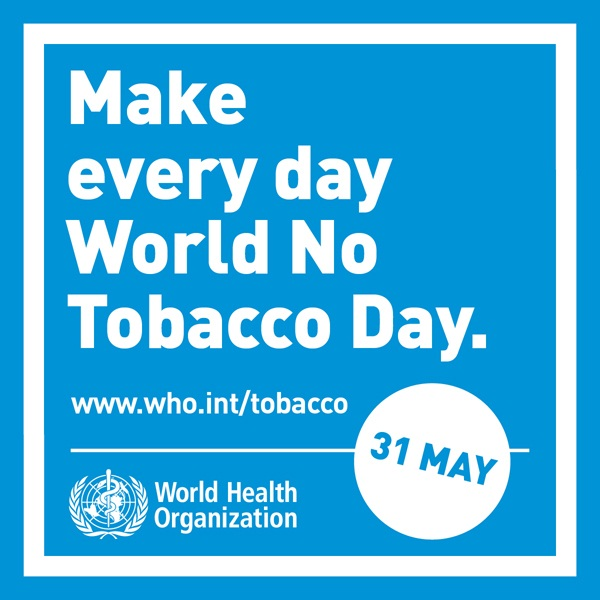
- World No Tobacco Day poster by the WHO
- Official name: World No Tobacco Day
- Observed by: All UN member states
- Type: Awareness
- Date: 31 May
- Next time: 31 May 2027
- Frequency: Annual
- Related to: Abstaining from tobacco

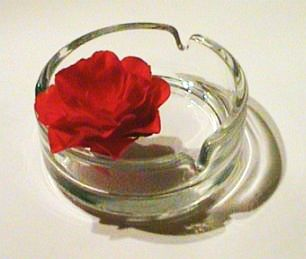
Ash trays with fresh flowers are a common symbol of World No Tobacco Day.

World No Tobacco Day (WNTD) is observed around the world every year on 31 May. The annual observance informs the public on the dangers of using tobacco, the business practices of tobacco companies, what the World Health Organization (WHO) is doing to fight against the use of tobacco, and what people around the world can do to claim their right to health and healthy living and to protect future generations.

The member states of the WHO created World No Tobacco Day in 1987 to draw global attention to the tobacco epidemic and the preventable death and disease it causes. The day is further intended to draw attention to the widespread prevalence of tobacco use, whose negative health effects lead to more than 8 million deaths each year worldwide, including 1.2 million as the result of non-smokers being exposed to second-hand smoke. The day has been met with both enthusiasm and resistance around the globe from governments, public health organizations, smokers, growers, and the tobacco industry.

== WHO and World No Tobacco Day ==
WNTD is one of 11 official global public health campaigns marked by the WHO, along with World Health Day, World Blood Donor Day, World Immunization Week, World Tuberculosis Day, World Malaria Day, World Hepatitis Day, World Chagas Disease Day, World Patient Safety Day, World Antimicrobial Awareness Week, and World AIDS Day.

=== Timeline ===
- In 1987, the WHO's World Health Assembly passed Resolution WHA40.38, calling for 7 April 1988 to be "a world no-smoking day". The objective of the day was to urge tobacco users worldwide to abstain from using tobacco products for 24 hours, an action they hoped would provide assistance for those trying to quit.
- In 1988, Resolution WHA42.19 was passed by the World Health Assembly, calling for the celebration of World No Tobacco Day, every year on 31 May. Since then, the WHO has supported World No Tobacco Day every year, linking each year to a different tobacco-related theme.
- In 1998, the WHO established the Tobacco Free Initiative (TFI), an attempt to focus international resources and attention on the global health issue of tobacco. The initiative provides assistance for creating global public health policy, encourages mobilization between societies, and supports the World Health Organization Framework Convention on Tobacco Control (FCTC). The WHO FCTC is a global public health treaty adopted in 2003 by countries around the globe as an agreement to implement policies that work towards tobacco cessation.
- In 2008, on the eve of the World No Tobacco Day, the WHO called for a worldwide ban on all tobacco advertising, promotion, and sponsorship. The theme of that year's day was "Tobacco-free youth"; therefore, this initiative was especially meant to target advertising efforts aimed at youth. According to the WHO, the tobacco industry must replace older quitting or dying smokers with younger consumers. Because of this, marketing strategies are commonly observed in places that will attract youth such as movies, the Internet, billboards, and magazines. Studies have shown that the more youth are exposed to tobacco advertising, the more likely they are to smoke.
- In 2015, WNTD highlighted the health risks associated with tobacco use and advocated for effective policies to reduce tobacco consumption, including ending the illicit trade of tobacco products.
- In 2017, the focus was "A threat to development". The campaign aims to demonstrate the threats that the tobacco industry poses to sustainable development, including the health and economic well-being of citizens in all countries.
- Following years: see the next section.

=== Themes ===
Each year, the WHO selects a theme for the day in order to create a more unified global message for WNTD. This theme then becomes the central component of the WHO's tobacco-related agenda for the following year. The WHO oversees the creation and distribution of publicity materials related to the theme, including brochures, fliers, posters, websites, and press releases. Videos were created as a part of the 2008 WNTD awareness campaign for the theme "Tobacco-free youth" and published on YouTube, and podcasts were first used in 2009.

In many of its WNTD themes and related publicity-materials, the WHO emphasizes the idea of "truth". Theme titles such as "Tobacco kills, don't be duped" (2000) and "Tobacco: deadly in any form or disguise" (2006) indicate a WHO belief that individuals may be misled or confused about the true nature of tobacco; the rationale for the 2000 and 2008 WNTD themes identify the marketing strategies and "illusions" created by the tobacco industry as a primary source of this confusion. The WHO's WNTD materials present an alternate understanding of the "facts" as seen from a global public health perspective. WNTD publicity materials provide an "official" interpretation of the most up-to-date tobacco-related research and statistics and provide a common ground from which to formulate anti-tobacco arguments around the world.

Current and past themes include the following:

- 2016: "Get ready for plain packaging".
- 2017: "Tobacco: a threat to development"
- 2018: "Tobacco breaks hearts: choose health, not tobacco"
- 2019: "Tobacco and lung health".
- 2020: "Tobacco and related industry tactics to attract younger generations".
- 2021: "Commit to quit".
- 2022: "Tobacco: threat to our environment"
- 2023: "Grow food, not tobacco"
- 2024: "Protecting children from tobacco industry interference".
- 2025: "Unmasking the appeal: exposing industry tactics on tobacco and nicotine products".
- 2026: "Unmasking the appeal: countering nicotine and tobacco addiction".

=== Event coordination ===
The WHO serves as a central hub for fostering communication and coordinating WNTD events around the world. The WHO website provides a place for groups to share news of their activities, and the organization publishes this information online by country.

=== Awards ===
Since 1988, the WHO has presented one or more awards to organizations or individuals who have made exceptional contributions to reducing tobacco consumption. World No Tobacco Day Awards are given to individuals from six different world regions (Africa, Americas, Eastern Mediterranean, Europe, South-East Asia, and Western Pacific), and Director-General Special Awards and Recognition Certificates are given to individuals from any region.

== Global observance ==
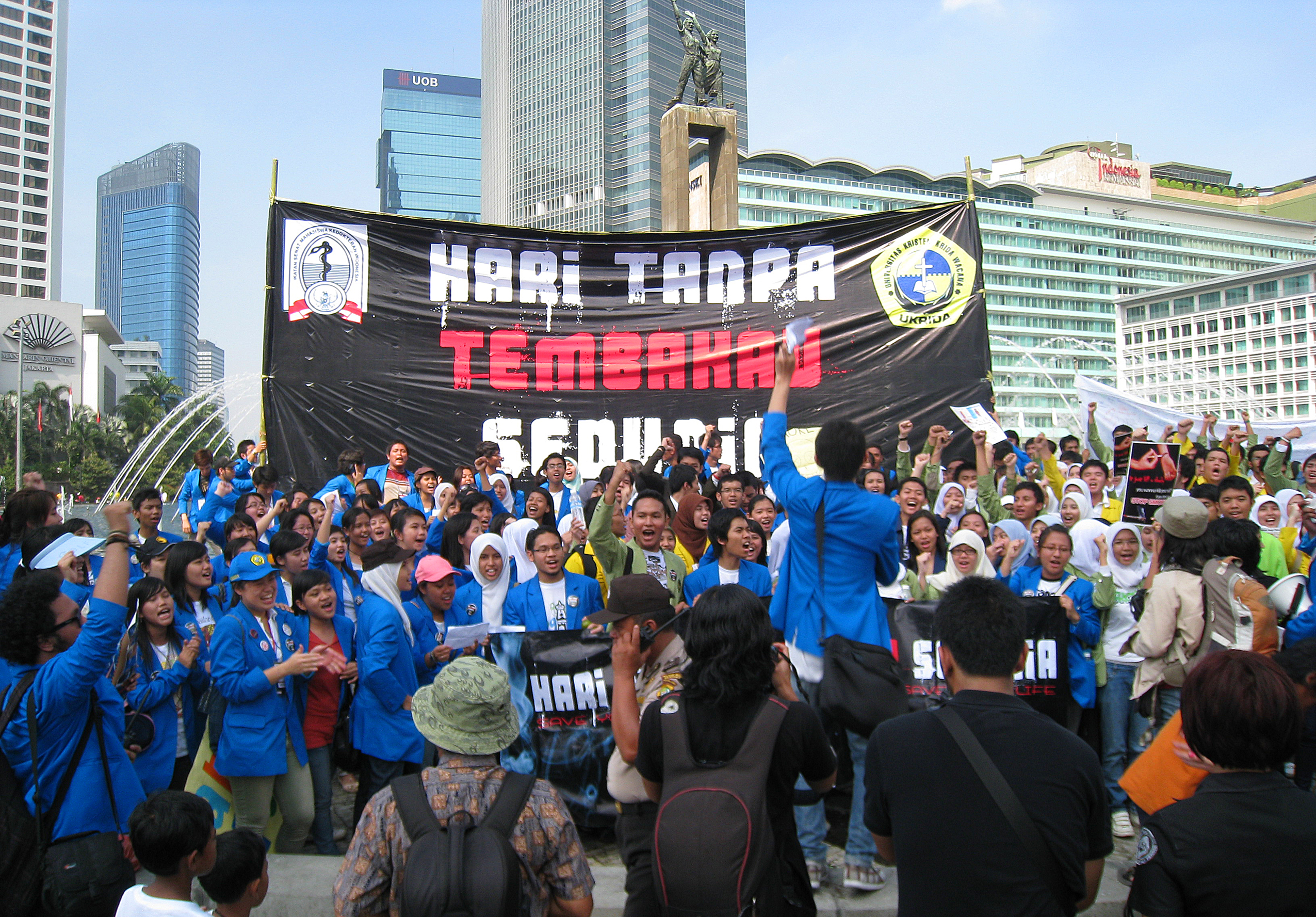
Medical students in Jakarta demonstrate against tobacco, Sunday, 30 May 2010, a day before World No Tobacco Day. The action was meant to raise public awareness on negative effect of smoking. Bundaran Hotel Indonesia, Central Jakarta, Indonesia.

Groups around the world – from local clubs to city councils to national governments – are encouraged by the WHO to organize events each year to help communities celebrate World No Tobacco Day in their own way at the local level. Past events have included letter writing campaigns to government officials and local newspapers, marches, public debates, local and national publicity campaigns, anti-tobacco activist meetings, educational programming, and public art.

In addition, many governments use WNTD as the start date for implementing new smoking bans and tobacco control efforts. For example, on 31 May 2008, a section of the Smoke Free Ontario Act came into effect banning tobacco "power walls" and displays at stores in this Canadian province, and all hospitals and government offices in Australia became smoke-free on 31 May 2010.

The day has also been used as a springboard for discussing the current and future state of a country as it relates to tobacco—for example in India which, with 275 million tobacco users, has one of the highest levels of tobacco consumption in the world. The Government of India has also launched a Smoking Cessation Helpline to help curb the widespread addiction in the country.

== Resistance ==
For some, WNTD is seen as a challenge to individual freedom of choice or even a culturally acceptable form of discrimination. From ignoring WNTD, to participating in protests or acts of defiance, to bookending the day with extra rounds of pro-tobacco advertisements and events, smokers, tobacco growers, and the tobacco industry have found ways to make their opinions heard.

=== Smoker response ===
There has been no sustained or widespread effort to organize counter-WNTD events on the part of smokers. However, some small groups, particularly in the United States, have created local pro-smoking events. For example, the Oregon Commentator, an independent conservative journal of opinion published at the University of Oregon, hosted a "Great American Smoke-in" on campus as a counter to the locally more widespread Great American Smokeout: "In response to the ever-increasing vilification of smokers on campus, the Oregon Commentator presents the Great American Smoke-in as an opportunity for students to join together and enjoy the pleasures of fine tobacco products". Similarly, "Americans for Freedom of Choice", a group in Honolulu, Hawaii, organized "World Defiance Day" in response to WNTD and Hawaii's statewide ban on smoking in restaurants.

=== Industry response ===
World No Tobacco Days have not induced a positive vocal response from the tobacco industry. For example, a memo made publicly available through the Tobacco Archives website was sent out to executives of R. J. Reynolds Tobacco Company in preparation for the third annual World No Tobacco Day, which had the theme of "Childhood and Youth Without Tobacco". The memo includes a warning about the upcoming day, a document that explains the arguments they anticipate the WHO making, and an explanation of how the company should respond to these claims. For example, in response to the anticipated argument that their advertisements target children, the company's response includes arguments that claim their advertisements are targeted towards adults by using adult models, and that advertisements lack the power to influence what people will actually purchase. In Uganda, since the World No Tobacco Day is the one day that the media is obligated to publicize tobacco control issues, the British American Tobacco company uses the eve of the day to administer counter-publicity. In 2001, their strategy included events such as a visit with the President of the International Tobacco Growers Association.

Some major pharmaceutical companies publicly support WNTD. For example, Pfizer was a large sponsor for many WNTD events in the United Arab Emirates in 2008. At the time, Pfizer was preparing to release its drug Chantix (varenicline) into the Middle Eastern market. The drug was "designed to activate the nicotinic receptor to reduce both the severity of the smoker's craving and the withdrawal symptoms from nicotine".

=== Grower response ===
Many tobacco growers feel that anti-tobacco efforts by organizations such as the WHO jeopardize their rights. For example, the International Tobacco Growers Association (ITGA) argues that poor farmers in Africa may suffer the consequences if WHO anti-tobacco movements succeed. They also argue that these efforts may gang up on manufacturers of tobacco and be an attack on the industry, therefore hurting the growers.

=== Potential for Indigenous American opposition ===
As some traditions and ceremonies of a number of cultures and ethnicities of Native Americans in the United States and First Nations in North America have been based on tobacco since pre-Columbian times, some potential for unintended abrogation of such traditions may exist from authorities seeking to eliminate tobacco from worldwide use – traditions of non-combustive use of tobacco for some forms of indigenous American ceremonial purposes have begun to be used for cessation of cigarette use among indigenous tribal members, while members of the Oglala Lakota have had their struggles to retain important historic tribal artifacts used for tobacco's traditional role in their ethnicity's traditions, to prevent their illegal sale. It is possible that a 2015 survey from Health Canada concerning future tobacco control legislation in Canada, having a section requesting advice from indigenous peoples within Canada, showed the potential of concern over such issues.

== See also ==
- International Pipe Smoking Day
- List of smoking bans
- No Smoking Day
- Tobacco control
