= World Blood Donor Day =

International observance, June 14

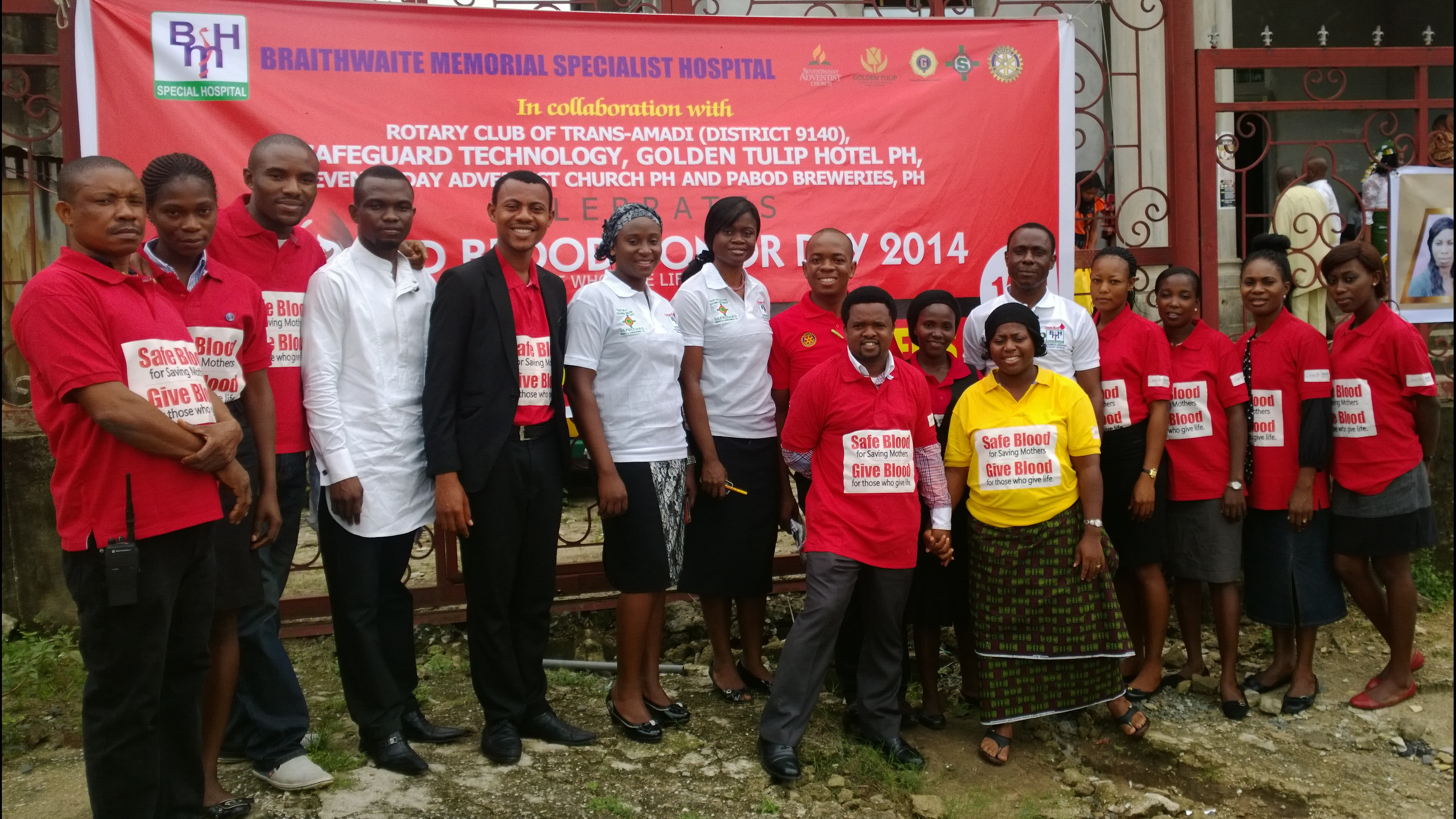
- A 2014 World Blood Donor Day celebration
- Observed by: All member states of the World Health Organization
- Date: 14 June
- Next time: 14 June 2027
- Frequency: annual

World Blood Donor Day (WBDD) is held on June 14 each year. The event was organised for the first time in 2004, by four core international organizations: the World Health Organization, the International Federation of Red Cross and Red Crescent Societies; the International Federation of Blood Donor Organizations (IFBDO) and the International Society of Blood Transfusion (ISBT) to raise awareness of the need for safe blood and blood products, and to thank blood donors for their voluntary, life-saving gifts of blood. World Blood Donor Day is one of 11 official global public health campaigns marked by the World Health Organization (WHO), along with World Health Day, World Chagas Disease Day, World Tuberculosis Day, World Immunization Week, World Patient Safety Day, World Malaria Day, World No Tobacco Day, World Hepatitis Day, World Antimicrobial Awareness Week and World AIDS Day.

== Background ==
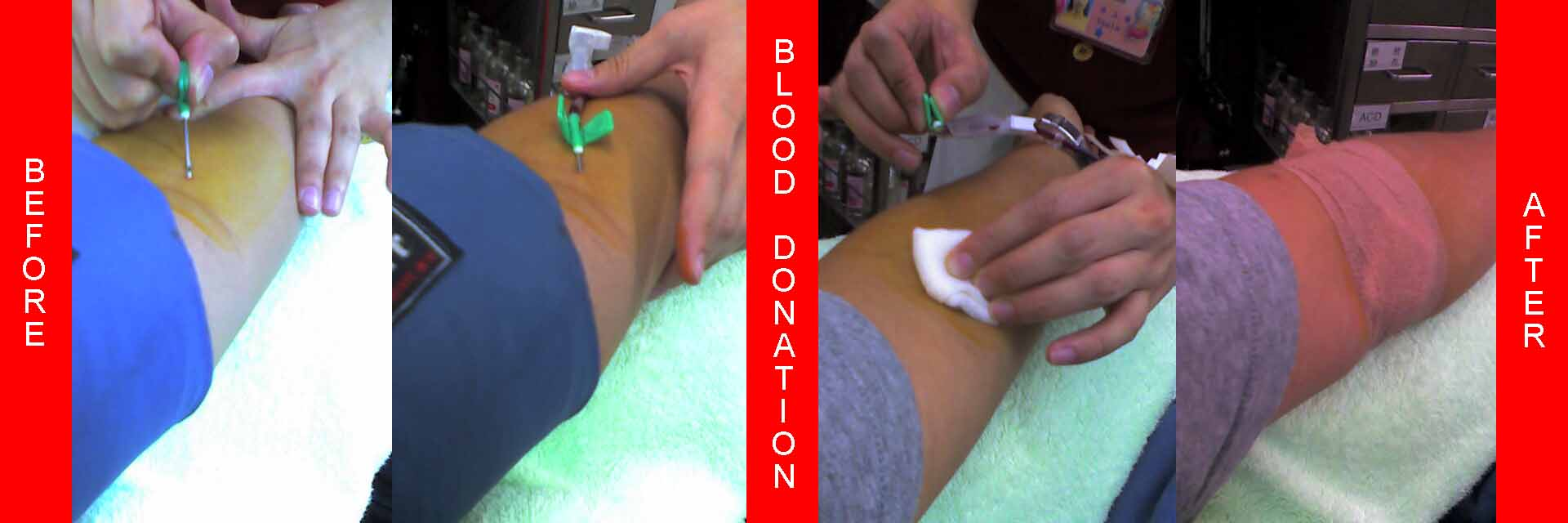
A donor's arm at various stages of donation. The two photographs on the left show a blood pressure cuff being used as a tourniquet.

Transfusion of blood and blood products helps save millions of lives every year. It can help patients who are suffering from life-threatening conditions live longer and with higher quality of life, and supports complex medical and surgical procedures. It also has an essential, life-saving role in maternal and perinatal care. Access to safe and sufficient blood and blood products can help reduce rates of death and disability due to severe bleeding during delivery and after childbirth.

In many countries, there is not an adequate supply of safe blood, and blood services face the challenge of making sufficient blood available, while also ensuring its quality and safety.

An adequate supply can only be assured through regular donations by voluntary unpaid blood donors. The WHO's goal is for all countries to obtain all their blood supplies from voluntary unpaid donors by 2020. In 2014, 60 countries have their national blood supplies based on 99-100% voluntary unpaid blood donations, with 73 countries still largely dependent on family and paid donors.

== History ==
World Blood Donor Day is celebrated every year by people around the world on June 14. It is celebrated on the birthday anniversary of Karl Landsteiner on June 14, 1868. Landsteiner was awarded the Nobel Prize for his discovery of the ABO blood group system.

== Importance ==
Blood is a necessary resource for planned treatments and urgent interventions. It is helpful for patients who are suffering from life-threatening conditions to live longer and with a higher quality of life. It supports complex medical and surgical procedures.

== Themes ==
=== 2025: Give blood, give hope: together we save lives ===
The theme for World Blood Donor Day 2025 is "Give blood, give hope: together we save lives".

=== 2024: 20 years of celebrating giving: thank you blood donors! ===
The theme for World Blood Donor Day 2024 was "20 years of celebrating giving: thank you blood donors!".

=== 2023: Give Blood, Give Plasma, Share Life, Share Often ===
The theme for World Blood Donor Day 2023 was “Give Blood, Give Plasma, Share Life, Share Often”. This theme reflects the important role blood donors play in maintaining the health and well-being of communities around the world.

=== 2022: Blood donation is an act of solidarity. Join the effort and save lives ===
The theme for Blood Donor Day 2022 was 'Blood donation is an act of solidarity. Join the effort and save lives'. This year, the global event on blood donor day was hosted by Mexico on June 14, 2022.

=== 2021: Give blood and keep the world beating ===
The theme for Blood Donation Day 2021 was 'Give Blood and keep the world beating'.

=== 2020: Safe Blood Saves Lives ===
The theme for Blood Donation Day 2020 was 'Safe Blood Saves Lives'. The Slogan of "Blood Donation Day 2020" was 'Give Blood And Make The World A Healthier Place'. This year WHO announced a virtual rally for COVID-19 pandemic.

=== 2019: Safe Blood for All ===
The theme for Blood Donation Day in 2019 was 'Safe Blood For All'.

=== 2018: Be there for someone else. Give blood. Share life ===
The theme for Blood Donation Day in 2018 was "Be there for someone else. Give blood. Share life."

=== 2017: Give Blood. Give Now. Give Often ===
The theme for Blood Donation Day in 2017 focused on blood donation in emergency situations. The first response when an emergency happens is "What Can You Do?" and the answer is "Give Blood. Give Now. Give Often" which is taken by World Health Organization.

=== 2016: Blood connects us all ===
The theme of the World Blood Donor Day, blood connects us all, highlights the notions of "sharing" and "connection" amongst blood donors and patients. The WBDD 2016 focused on thanking blood donors while emphasizing the role of the voluntary donation. The 2016 campaign brought to light the stories of the different people saved through blood donation to promote awareness and inspire people to donate.

The host country of WBDD 2016 was The Netherlands. Williem-Alexander, the king of the Netherlands, opened the ceremony by thanking donors.

=== 2015: Thank you for saving my life ===
It emphasizes thanking of blood donors who save lives every day through their blood donations and inspires more people all over the world to donate blood voluntarily and regularly with the slogan “Give freely, give often". Blood donation matters. This year campaign pays attention to stories from people whose lives have been saved through blood donation. Activities include memorable events, meetings, publication of relevant stories on media, scientific conferences, publication of articles on national, regional and international scientific journals, and other activities that would help in encouraging the title of this year's World Blood Donor Day. The host country for World Blood Donor Day 2015 is China through its blood center in Shanghai, Shanghai Blood Centre, also the WHO Collaborating Center for Blood Transfusion Services.

=== 2014: Safe blood for saving mothers ===
The focus of the WBDD 2014 campaign was “Safe blood for saving mothers”. The goal of the campaign was to increase awareness about why timely access to safe blood and blood products is essential for all countries, as part of a comprehensive approach to prevent maternal deaths.

According to the World Health Organization, 800 women die every day from pregnancy and childbirth-related complications. Severe bleeding is the cause of 34% of maternal deaths in Africa, 31% in Asia and 21% in Latin America and the Caribbean.

The global host for the WBDD 2014 event was Sri Lanka. Through its national blood transfusion service, Sri Lanka promotes voluntary unpaid donation to increase access to safe and sufficient blood and blood products.

=== 2013: Give the gift of life : donate blood ===
The focus for the WBDD 2013 campaign – which marked the 10th anniversary of World Blood Donor Day – was blood donation as a gift that saves lives. The WHO encouraged all countries to highlight stories from people whose lives have been saved through blood donation, as a way of motivating regular blood donors to continue giving blood and people in good health who have never given blood, particularly young people, to begin doing so.

The host country for World Blood Donor Day 2013 was France. Through its national blood service, the Etablissement Français du Sang (EFS), France has been promoting voluntary non-remunerated blood donation since the 1950s.

=== 2012: Every blood donor is a hero ===
The 2012 campaign focused on the idea that any person can become a hero by giving blood. Blood cannot yet be manufactured artificially, so voluntary blood donation remains vital for healthcare worldwide. Many anonymous blood donors save lives every day through their blood donations.

== See also ==
- List of blood donation agencies
- Transfusion medicine
