= World Hepatitis Day =

WHO public health campaign

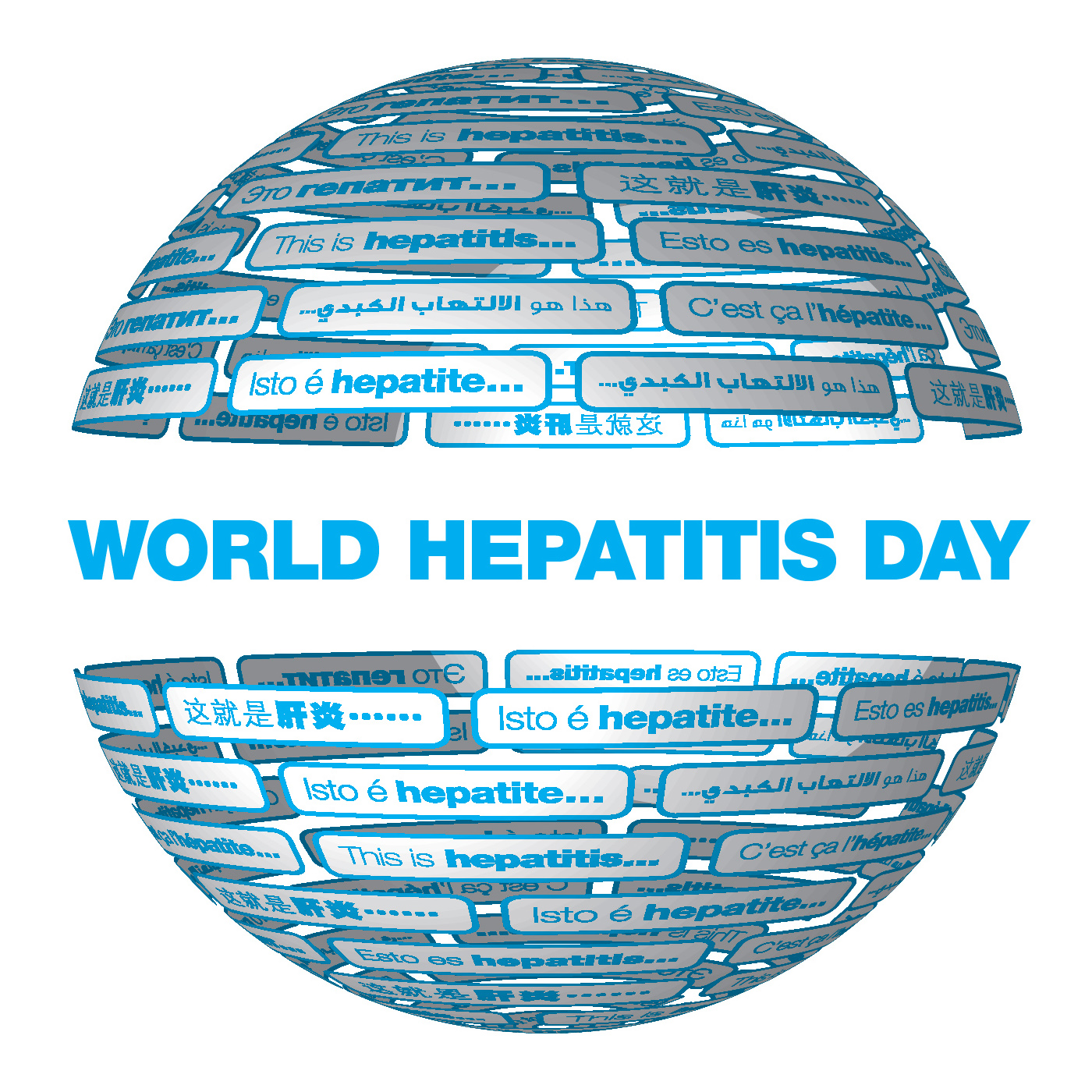
- The World Hepatitis Day logo is the global symbol for encouraging better awareness, action, and support to prevent and treat viral hepatitis.
- Date: 28 July
- Next time: 28 July 2027
- Frequency: annual

World Hepatitis Day, observed on July 28 every year, aims to raise global awareness of hepatitis — a group of infectious diseases known as hepatitis A, B, C, D, and E — and encourage prevention, diagnosis and treatment. Hepatitis affects hundreds of millions of people worldwide, causing acute and chronic disease with approximately 1.34 million lives lost every year. Hepatitis can cause inflammation of the liver both acutely and chronically, and can be fatal. In some countries, hepatitis B is the most common cause of cirrhosis and may also cause liver cancer.

World Hepatitis Day is one of 11 official global public health campaigns marked by the World Health Organization (WHO), along with World Health Day, World Chagas Disease Day, World Blood Donor Day, World Malaria Day, World Immunization Week, World Tuberculosis Day, World No Tobacco Day, World Patient Safety Day, World Antimicrobial Awareness Week and World AIDS Day.

== Background ==
Hepatitis groups, patients and advocates worldwide take part in events on 28 July. Notably in 2012, a Guinness World Record was created when 12,588 people from 20 countries did the Three Wise Monkeys actions on World Hepatitis Day to signify the willful ignorance of the disease.

== History ==
The inaugural International Hepatitis C Awareness day, coordinated by various European and Middle Eastern Patient Groups and Baby Muriel, took place on October 1, 2004. However, many patient groups continued to mark 'hepatitis day' on disparate dates. For this reason in 2008, the World Hepatitis Alliance in collaboration with patient groups declared May 19 the first global World Hepatitis Day.

Following the adoption of a resolution during the 63rd World Health Assembly in May 2010, World Hepatitis Day was given global endorsement as the primary focus for national and international awareness-raising efforts and the date was changed to July 28 (in honour of Nobel Laureate Baruch Samuel Blumberg, discoverer of the hepatitis B virus, who celebrates his birthday on that date). The resolution resolves that "28 July shall be designated as World Hepatitis Day in order to provide an opportunity for education and greater understanding of viral hepatitis as a global public health problem, and to stimulate the strengthening of preventive and control measures of this disease in Member States."

World Hepatitis Day is now recognised in over 100 countries each year through events such as free screenings, poster campaigns, demonstrations, concerts, talk shows, flash mobs and vaccination drives, amongst many others. Each year a report is published by the WHO and the World Hepatitis Alliance detailing all the events across the world.

== Themes ==
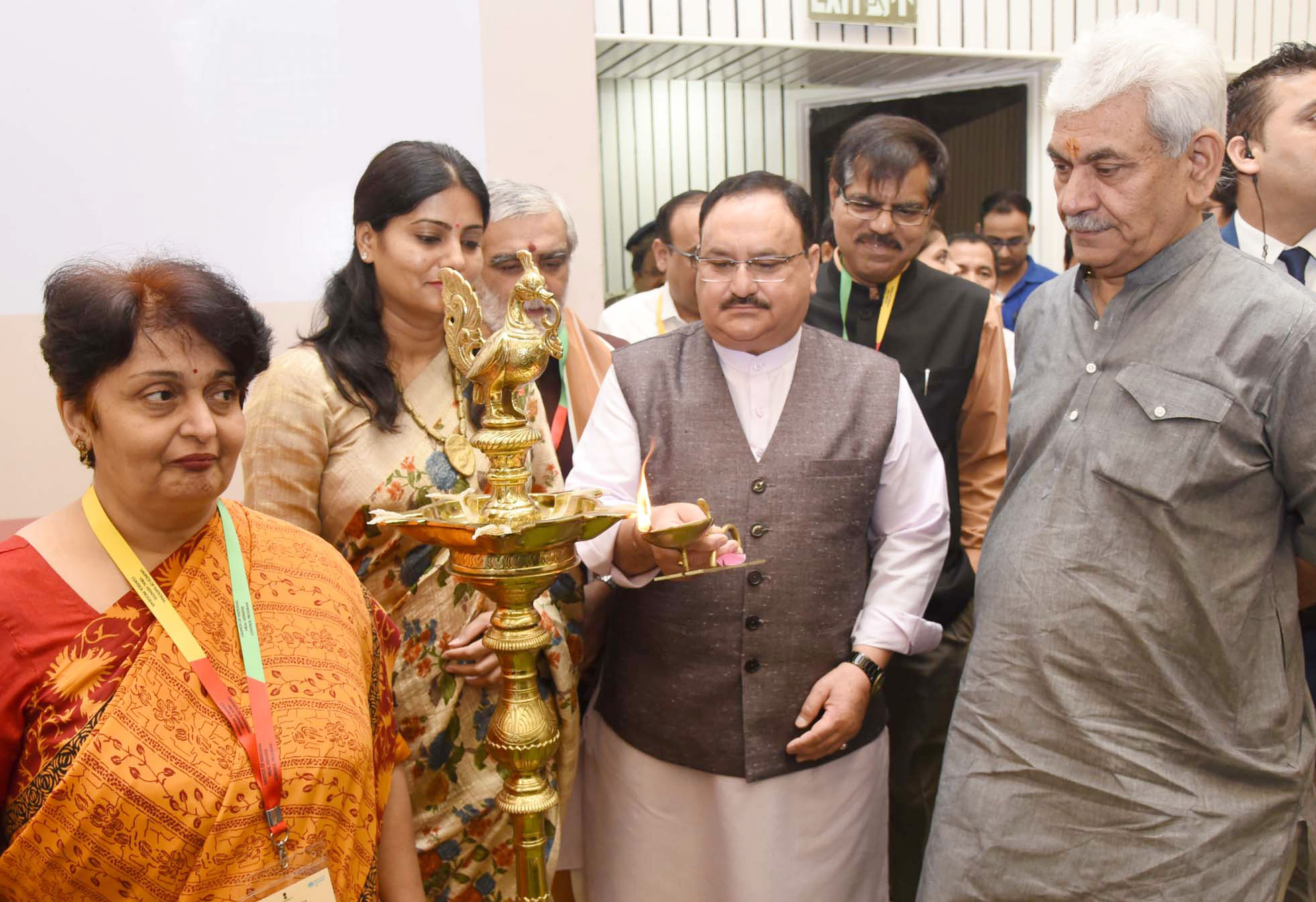
Dignitaries lighting the lamp at the launch of the National Viral Hepatitis Control Program in India, on the occasion of the World Hepatitis Day, 2018

World Hepatitis Day provides an opportunity to focus on actions such as:

- Raising awareness of the different forms of hepatitis and how they are transmitted;
- Strengthening prevention, screening and control of viral hepatitis and its related diseases;
- Increasing hepatitis B vaccine coverage and integration into national immunization programmes; and
- Coordinating a global response to hepatitis.

Each year focuses on a specific theme. The list of themes is as follows:

- 2011: Hepatitis affects everyone, everywhere. Know it. Confront it. Confront her.
- 2012: It's closer than you think.
- 2013: More must be done to stop this silent killer.
- 2014: Hepatitis: Think Again
- 2015: Prevention of viral Hepatitis. Act now.
- 2016: Know Hepatitis-Act now.
- 2017: Eliminate Hepatities.
- 2018: Test. Treat. Hepatitis.
- 2019: Invest in eliminating hepatitis.
- 2020: Hepatitis Free Future
- 2021: Hepatitis can't wait
- 2022: Bringing Hepatitis care closer to you
- 2023: Our life, our liver
- 2024: It's time for action
