= Great American Smokeout =

Day to encourage smoking cessation

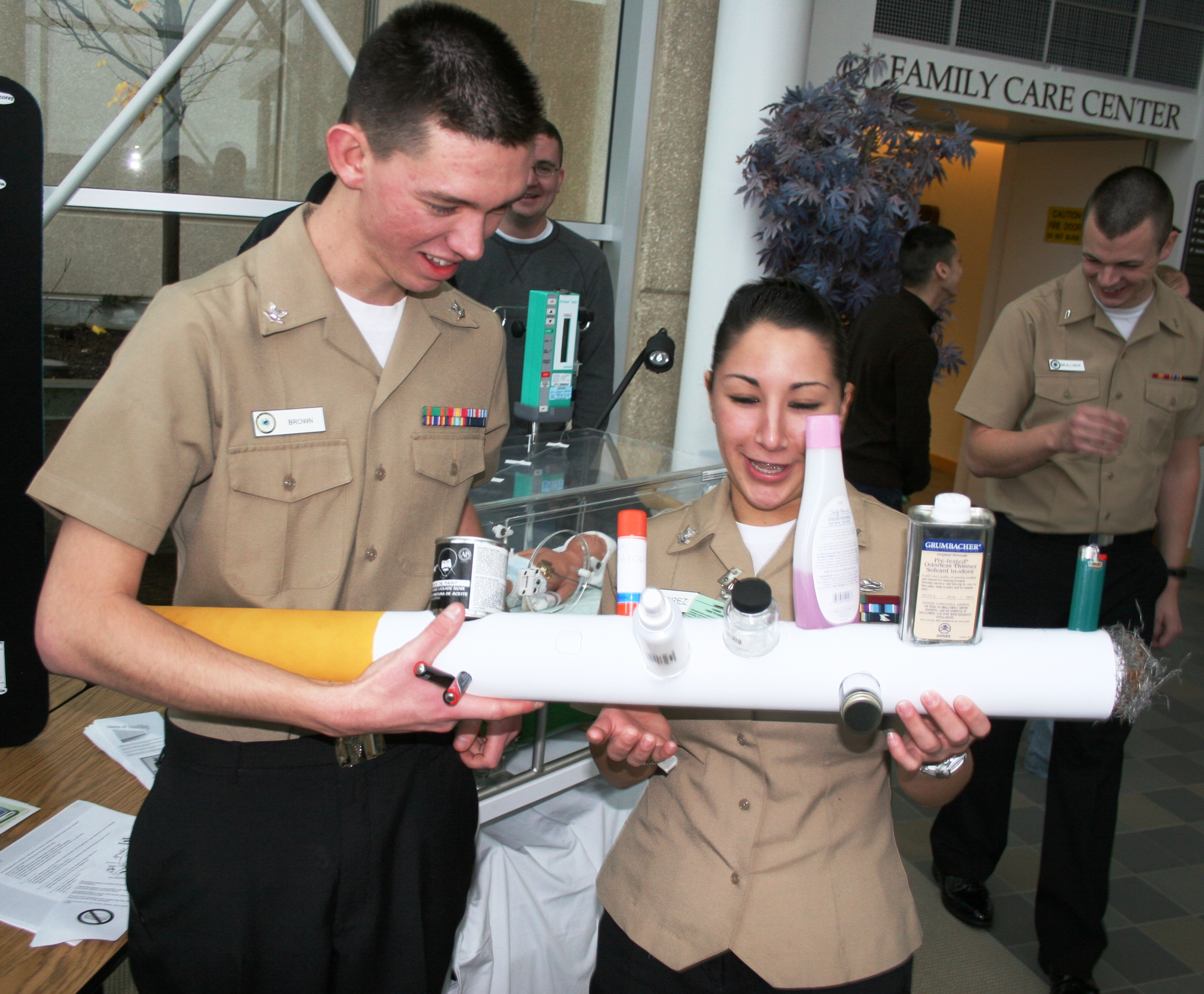
A model cigarette featuring chemicals and additives to raise awareness of the dangers of smoking for the Great American Smokeout

The Great American Smokeout is an annual intervention event on the third Thursday of November by the American Cancer Society. Approximately 40 million American adults still smoke, and tobacco use remains the single largest preventable cause of disease and premature death in the country. The event challenges people to quit on that day, or use the day to make a plan to quit.

== History ==
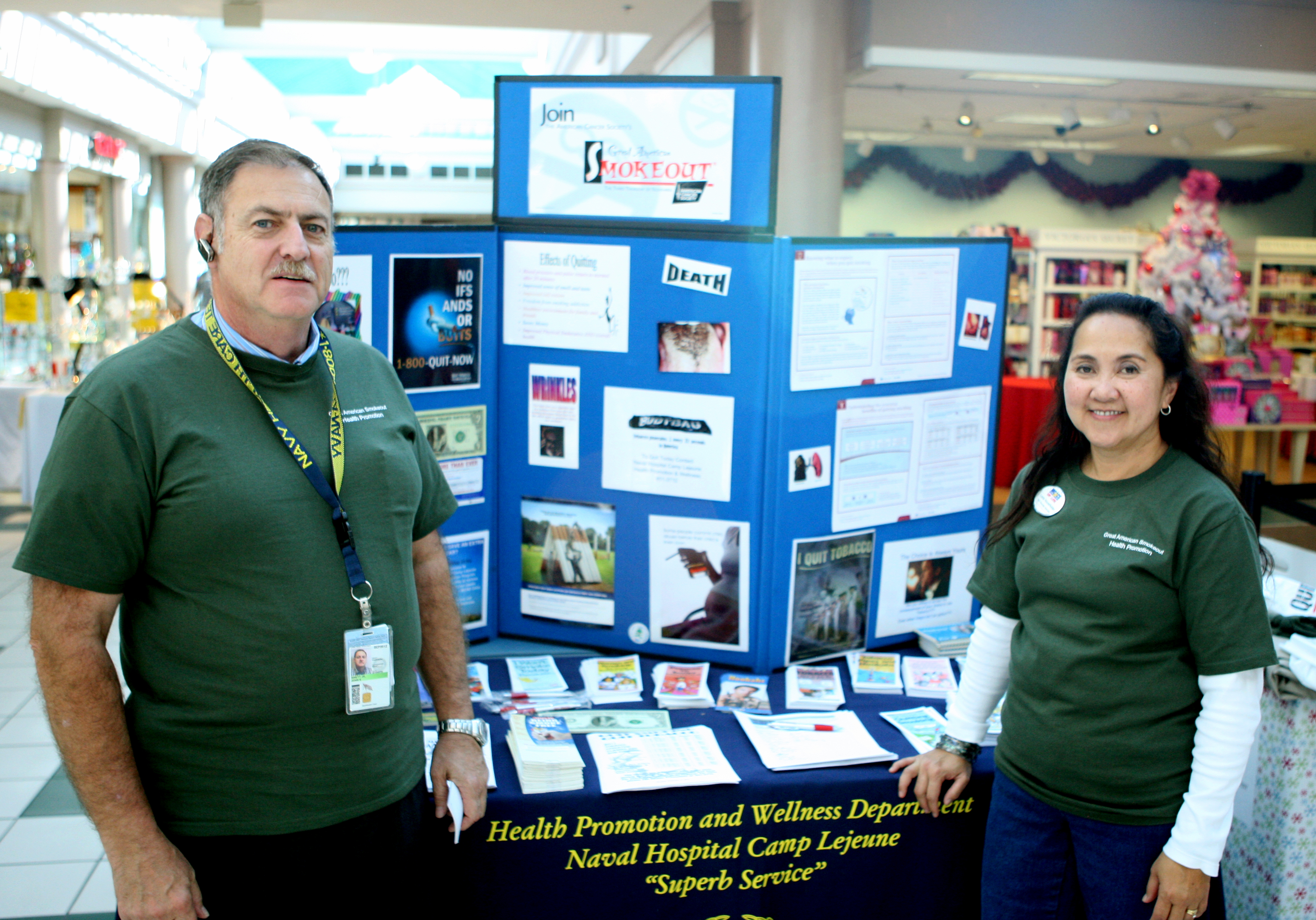
An informational booth for the Great American Smokeout

The first Great American Smokeout was held in San Francisco's Union Square on November 16, 1977. The event evolved from a series of smaller-scale initiatives. In 1970, in Randolph, Massachusetts, Arthur P. Mullaney suggested people give up cigarettes for a day and donate the money to a local high school. In 1974, a "Don't Smoke Day" (or "D-Day") was promoted by Lynn R. Smith of the Monticello Times in Monticello, Minnesota. On November 18, 1976, the California Division of the American Cancer Society successfully prompted nearly one million smokers to quit for the day. That California event marked the first Smokeout.

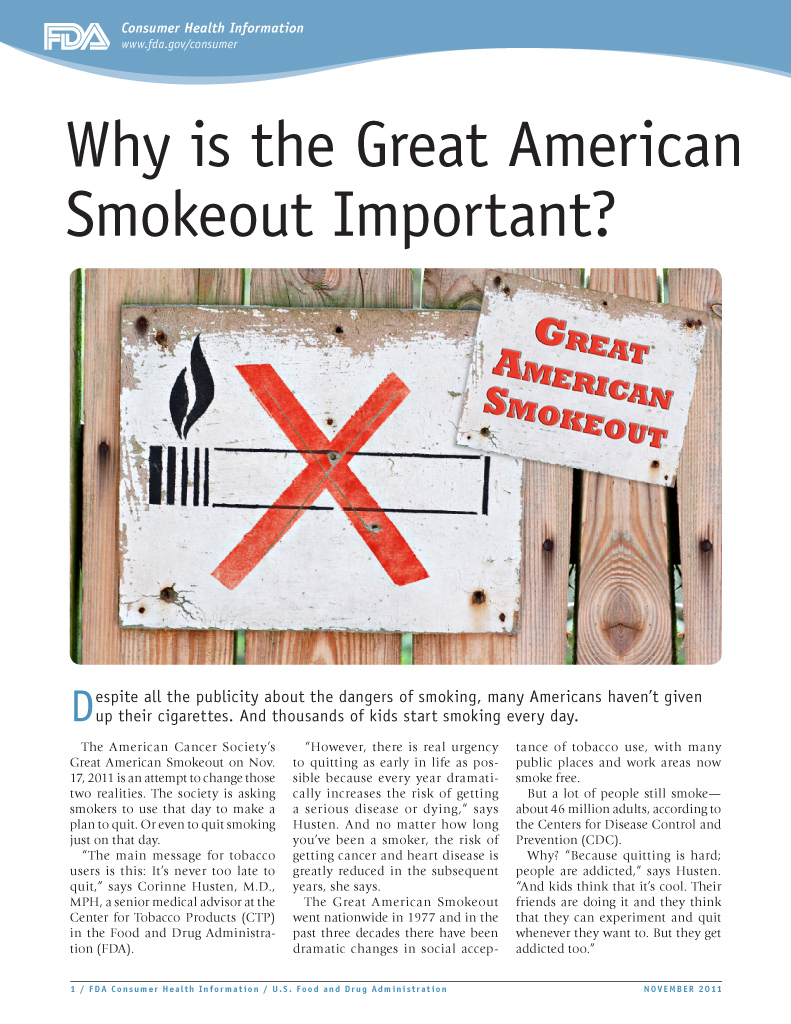
FDA leaflet about the Great American Smokeout

== See also ==
- World No Tobacco Day
- No Smoking Day (UK)
