= World Health Day =

Worldwide day of action organized by the WHO

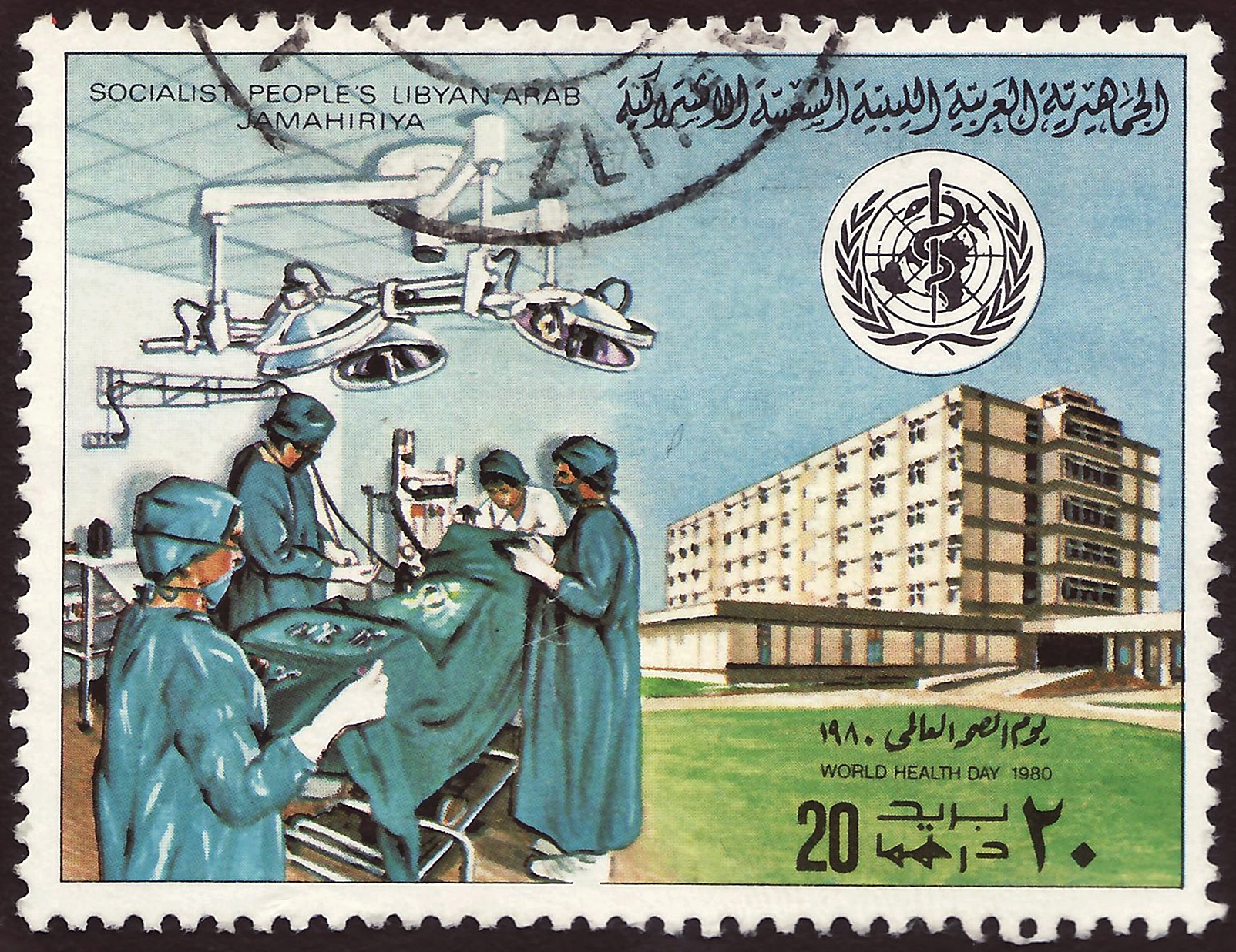
- A 1980 Libyan commemorative stamp recognizing World Health Day
- Observed by: All Member States of the World Health Organization
- Date: 7 April
- Next time: 7 April 2027
- Frequency: annual

World Health Day is a global health awareness day celebrated every year on 7 April, under the sponsorship of the World Health Organization (WHO), as well as other related organizations.

In 1948, the WHO held the First World Health Assembly. The Assembly decided to celebrate 7 April of each year, with effect from 1950, as the World Health Day. The World Health Day is held to mark WHO's founding and is seen as an opportunity by the organization to draw worldwide attention to a subject of major importance to global health each year. The WHO organizes international, regional and local events on the Day related to a particular theme. World Health Day is acknowledged by various governments and non-governmental organizations with interests in public health issues, who also organize activities and highlight their support in media reports, such as the Global Health Council.

World Health Day is one of 11 official global health campaigns marked by WHO, along with World Tuberculosis Day, World Immunization Week, World Malaria Day, World No Tobacco Day, World AIDS Day, World Blood Donor Day, World Chagas Disease Day, World Patient Safety Day, World Antimicrobial Awareness Week and World Hepatitis Day.

== List of World Health Days themes ==
- 1991: Should Disaster Strike, be prepared
- 1992: Heart beat: A rhythm of Health
- 1993: Handle life with care: Prevent violence and Negligence
- 1994: Oral Health for a Healthy Life
- 1995: Global Polio Eradication
- 1996: Healthy Cities for better life
- 1997: Emerging infectious diseases
- 1998: Safe motherhood
- 1999: Active aging makes the difference
- 2000: Safe Blood starts with me
- 2001: Mental Health: stop exclusion, dare to care
- 2002: Move for health
- 2003: Shape the future of life: healthy environments for children
- 2004: Road safety
- 2005: Make every mother and child count
- 2006: Working together for health
- 2007: International health security
- 2008: Protecting health from the adverse effects of climate change
- 2009: Save lives, Make hospitals safe in emergencies
- 2010: Urbanization and health: make cities healthier

- 2011: Antimicrobial resistance: no action today, no cure tomorrow
- 2012: Good health adds life to years
- 2013: Healthy heart beat, Healthy blood pressure
- 2014: Vector-borne diseases: small bite, big threat
- 2015: Food safety
- 2016: Halt the rise: beat diabetes
- 2017: Depression: Let's talk
- 2018: Universal Health Coverage: : everyone, everywhere
- 2019: Universal Health Coverage: : everyone, everywhere
- 2020: Support Nurses and Midwives
- 2021: Building a Fairer and Healthier World for Everyone
- 2022: Our planet, our health
- 2023: Health For All
- 2024: My health, my right
- 2025: Healthy beginnings, hopeful futures
- 2026: Together for health. Stand with science

== Themes of World Health Days ==
=== 2006: working together for health ===
Nations identified with critical health worker shortages

In 2006, World Health Day was devoted to the health workforce crisis, or chronic shortages of health workers around the world due to decades of under investment in their education, training, salaries, working environment and management. The day was also meant to celebrate individual health workers – the people who provide health care to those who need it, in other words those at the heart of health systems.

The Day also marked the launch of the WHO's World Health Report 2006, which focused on the same theme. The report contained an assessment of the current crisis in the global health workforce, revealing an estimated shortage of almost 4.3 million physicians, midwives, nurses and other health care providers worldwide, and further proposed a series of actions for countries and the international community to tackle it.

=== 2008: protecting health from the adverse effects of climate change ===
In 2008, World Health Day focused on the need to protect health from the adverse effects of climate change and establish links between climate change and health and other development areas such as environment, food, energy, transport.

The theme "protecting health from climate change" put health at the centre of the global dialogue about climate change. WHO selected this theme in recognition that climate change is posing ever growing threats to global public health security.

=== 2009: save lives. Make hospitals safe in emergencies ===
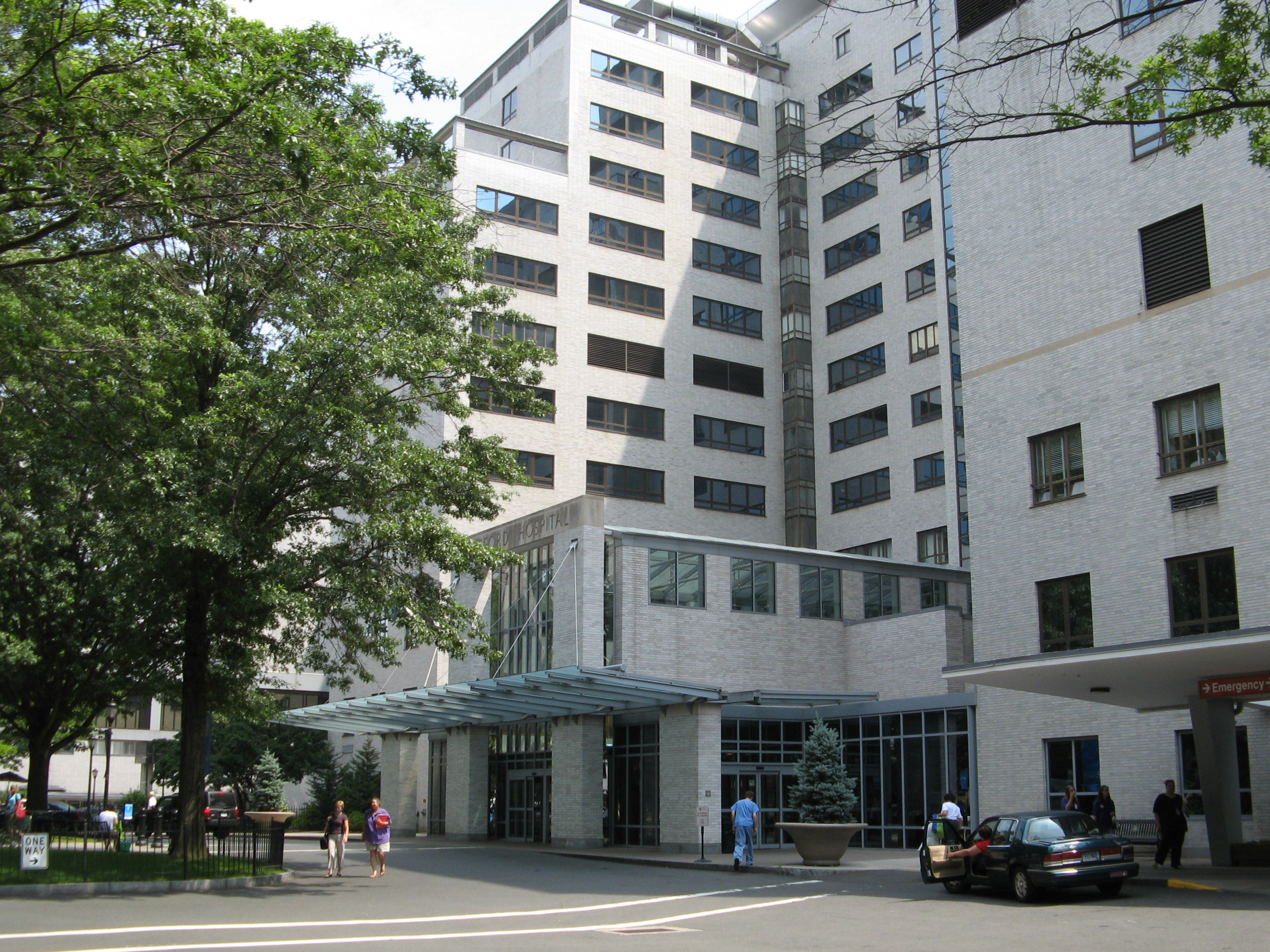
Hospital in Hartford, Connecticut

World Health Day 2009 focused on the safety of health facilities and the readiness of health workers who treat those affected by emergencies. Health centres and staff are critical lifelines for vulnerable people in disasters – treating injuries, preventing illnesses and caring for people's health needs. Often, already fragile health systems are unable to keep functioning through a disaster, with immediate and future public health consequences.

For this year's World Health Day campaign, WHO and international partners underscored the importance of investing in health infrastructure that can withstand hazards and serve people in immediate need, and urged health facilities to implement systems to respond to internal emergencies, such as fires, and ensure the continuity of care.

=== 2010: urbanization and health ===
With the campaign "1000 cities, 1000 lives", events were organized worldwide during the week starting 7 April 2010. The global goals of the campaign were:

- 1000 cities: to open up public spaces to health, whether it be activities in parks, town hall meetings, clean-up campaigns, or closing off portions of streets to motorized vehicles.
- 1000 lives: to collect 1000 stories of urban health champions who have taken action and had a significant impact on health in their cities.

=== 2011: antimicrobial resistance ===
The theme of World Health Day 2011, marked on 7 April 2011, was "antimicrobial resistance and its global spread" and focused on the need for governments and stakeholders to implement the policies and practices needed to prevent and counter the emergence of highly resistant microorganisms.

When infections caused by resistant microorganisms fail to respond to standard treatments, including antibiotics and other antimicrobial medicines – also known as drug resistance – this may result in prolonged illness and greater risk of death.

On World Health Day 2011, WHO called for intensified global commitment to safeguard antimicrobial medicines for future generations. The organization introduced a six-point policy package to combat the spread of antimicrobial resistance:

1. Commit to a comprehensive, financed national plan with accountability and civil society engagement.
2. Strengthen surveillance and laboratory capacity.
3. Ensure uninterrupted access to essential medicines of assured quality.
4. Regulate and promote rational use of medicines, including in animal husbandry, and ensure proper patient care; reduce use of antimicrobials in food-producing animals.
5. Enhance infection prevention and control.
6. Foster innovations and research and development for new tools.

=== 2012: ageing and health ===
World Health Day 2012 was marked with the slogan "Good health adds life to years". Life expectancy is going up in most countries, meaning more and more people live longer and enter an age when they may need health care. Meanwhile, birth rates are generally falling. Countries and health care systems need to find innovative and sustainable ways to cope with the demographic shift. As stated by John Beard, director of the WHO Department of Ageing and Life Course, "With the rapid ageing of populations, finding the right model for long-term care becomes more and more urgent".

Different activities were organized by WHO as well as non-governmental and community organizations around the world to mark World Health Day 2012.

=== 2013: Healthy Blood Pressure ===
The theme of World Health Day 2013, marked on 7 April 2013, was the need to control raised blood pressure (hypertension) as a "silent killer, global public health crisis". The slogan for the campaign was "Healthy Heart Beat, Healthy Blood Pressure". The WHO reports hypertension – which is both preventable and treatable – contributes to the burden of heart disease, stroke and kidney failure, and is an important cause of premature death and disability. The organization estimates one in 3 adults has raised blood pressure.

Specific objectives of the World Health Day 2013 campaign were to:

- raise awareness of the causes and consequences of high blood pressure;
- provide information on how to prevent high blood pressure and related complications;
- encourage adults to check their blood pressure and follow the advice of healthcare professionals;
- encourage self care to prevent high blood pressure;
- to make blood pressure measurement affordable to all;
- to incite national and local authorities to create enabling environments for healthy behaviours.

=== 2014: small bite, big threat ===
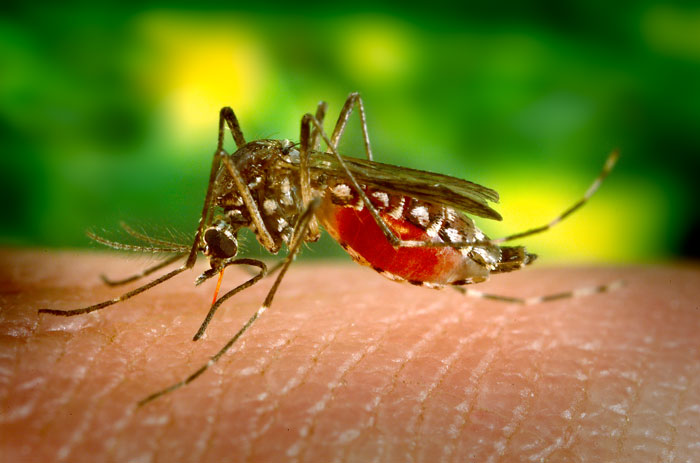
Aedes aegypti yellow fever mosquito feeding

World Health Day 2014 put the spotlight on some of the most commonly known vectors – such as mosquitoes, sandflies, bugs, ticks and snails – responsible for transmitting a wide range of parasites and pathogens that can cause many different illnesses. Mosquitoes, for example, transmit malaria – the most deadly vector-borne disease, causing an estimated 660 000 deaths annually worldwide – as well as dengue fever, lymphatic filariasis, chikungunya, Japanese encephalitis, and yellow fever. More than half of the world's population is at risk of these diseases.

The goal of the World Health Day 2014 campaign was better protection from vector-borne diseases, especially for families living in areas where diseases are transmitted by vectors, and travelers to countries where they pose a health threat. The campaign advocated for health authorities in countries where vector-borne diseases are a public health problem or emerging threat, to put in place measures to improve surveillance and protection.

=== 2015: food safety ===
The WHO promoted improvement of food safety as part of the 2015 World Health Day campaign. Unsafe food — food containing harmful bacteria, viruses, parasites or chemical substances — is responsible for more than 200 diseases, and is linked to the deaths of some 2 million people annually, mostly children. Changes in food production, distribution and consumption; changes to the environment; new and emerging pathogens; and antimicrobial resistance all pose challenges to food safety systems.

The WHO works with countries and partners to strengthen efforts to prevent, detect and respond to foodborne disease outbreaks in line with the Codex Alimentarius, advocating that food safety is a shared responsibility — from farmers and manufacturers to vendors and consumers — and raising awareness about the importance of the part everyone can play in ensuring that the food on our plate is safe to eat.

=== 2016: diabetes ===
Rates of diabetes worldwide (per 1,000 inhabitants) — world average was 2.8%.: no data ≤ 7.5 7.5–15 15–22.5 22.5–30 30–37.5 37.5–45 / 45–52.5 52.5–60 60–67.5 67.5–75 75–82.5 ≥ 82.5

The WHO focused World Health Day 2016, on diabetes – a largely preventable and treatable non-communicable disease that is rapidly increasing in numbers in many countries, most dramatically in low- and middle-income countries. Simple lifestyle measures have been shown to be effective in preventing or delaying the onset of type 2 diabetes, including maintaining normal body weight, engaging in regular physical activity, and eating a healthy diet. Diabetes can be controlled and managed to prevent complications through diagnosis, self-management education, and affordable treatment. The WHO estimates about 422 million people in the world have diabetes, with the disease the direct cause of some 1.5 million deaths. The goals of WHD 2016 are (1) scale up prevention, (2) strengthen care, and (3) enhance surveillance.

=== 2017: Depression: Let's Talk ===
World Health Day 2017, celebrated on 7 April, aims to mobilize action on depression. This condition affects people of all ages, from all walks of life, in all countries. It impacts on people's ability to carry out everyday tasks, with consequences for families, friends, and even communities, workplaces, and health care systems. At worst, depression can lead to self-inflicted injury and suicide. A better understanding of depression – which can be prevented and treated – will help reduce the stigma associated with the illness, and lead to more people seeking help.

=== 2018: Universal Health Coverage: Everyone, Everywhere ===
World Health Day 2018 theme, "Universal Health Coverage: Everyone, Everywhere", emphasized the idea that health is a fundamental human right, and that all people should be able to have access to health care. The slogan for the day was "Health For All". Several events were held including a panel discussion on universal health coverage which was live streamed. 2018 marked the 70th anniversary of the World Health Organization's founding.

=== 2019: Universal Health Coverage: Everyone, Everywhere ===
The 2019 World Health Day theme was "Universal Health Coverage: Everyone, Everywhere", a repeat of the 2018 theme, with an emphasis on the idea that "Universal Health Coverage is the WHO's number one goal". To commemorate the 2019 World Health Day theme, the World Health Organization launched a campaign to sign a petition for health for all, held a Facebook live event, and shared information about primary health care and universal health coverage "statistics and facts".

=== 2020: Support Nurses and Midwives ===
The 2020 World Health Day theme took place in the context of the COVID-19 global pandemic and was therefore launched as 'Support Nurses and Midwives". Around the world, people spent the day thanking the nurses and health care workers on the frontlines battling the COVID-19 coronavirus. The US White House released a presidential message emphasizing the role public health plays in "building strong, prosperous, and free societies around the world". The celebration of 2020 World Health Day took place around the world in a mostly virtual environment through online press conferences, announcements, and social media due to the worldwide, broad based, "stay at home" order due to the COVID-19 coronavirus pandemic. Much of the efforts were focused on raising funds for the COVID-19 solidarity response fund.

=== 2026 ===
For World Health Day on April 7, 2026, the World Health Organization (WHO) launched high-impact initiatives in collaboration with France to shift the "One Health" vision into practical action. The WHO marked the occasion under the official theme, "Together for health. Stand with science."

== See also ==
- International Day of Yoga
- World Health Organization
- Tedros Adhanom
- Health promotion
- World Health Report
- World Diabetes Day
- World Mental Health Day
