= No Smoking Day =

Annual day devoted to smoking cessation in the UK

- Observed by: United Kingdom
- Date: Second Wednesday in March
- 2025 date: March 12
- 2026 date: March 11
- 2027 date: March 10
- 2028 date: March 8
- Frequency: annual

No Smoking Day is an annual health awareness day in the United Kingdom which is intended to help smokers who want to quit smoking. The first No Smoking Day was on Ash Wednesday in 1984, and it now takes place on the second Wednesday in March. Martin Raw, a tobacco-cessation researcher, was involved in the creation of No Smoking Day.

Each year, the campaign is promoted with a theme in the form of a short phrase. In 2010, this theme was "Break free", encouraging smokers to break free from the chains of cigarettes and quit on No Smoking Day. The 2011 theme was "Time to quit?". Research conducted by GfK NOP following the 2009 campaign found that 1 in 10 smokers quit on No Smoking Day. In 2011, Parliamentary notices for the campaign reported that almost 750,000 smokers made an attempt to quit on No Smoking Day. In a 2023 the national No Smoking Day theme that year was “Stopping smoking improves your brain health”, with discussion focusing on the increased risk of dementia in smokers. The UK Department of Health and Social Care (DHSC) urged smokers in 2024 to make an attempt to quit for No Smoking Day and the DHSC adapted a regional “Smoking Survivors” TV and radio advert together with Fresh as part of the national campaign.

The campaign was run by a charity of the same name, based in London with four full-time staff, until this was merged with the British Heart Foundation in 2011. In December 2012 after the merge, it was removed from the charity register. It is funded by a coalition of governmental and voluntary sector organizations, with an interest in health. No Smoking Day's most recent President was entrepreneur, TV personality, and anti-tobacco campaigner Duncan Bannatyne OBE. Bannatyne is an ex-smoker who publicly took on British American Tobacco at its AGM in April 2008.

The Charity Commission record for the charity lists total income of £177,314 and total expenditure of £452,564 for the financial year ending 31 March 2012.

A 2009 study found the campaign to be "an extremely cost-effective public health intervention".

== See also ==
- World No Tobacco Day
- World AIDS Day
- World Cancer Day
- International Enjoy a Cigar Day
- International Pipe Smoking Day
