= World AIDS Day =

International day on 1 December

- The red ribbon is the global symbol for solidarity with HIV-positive people and those living with AIDS.
- Observed by: All UN Member States
- Type: International
- Date: 1 December
- Frequency: Annual
- First time: 1988; 38 years ago

World AIDS Day, designated on 1 December every year since 1988, is an international day dedicated to raising awareness of the AIDS pandemic caused by the spread of HIV infection and mourning those who have died of the disease. The acquired immunodeficiency syndrome (AIDS) is a life-threatening condition caused by the human immunodeficiency virus (HIV). The HIV virus attacks the immune system of the patient and reduces its resistance to other diseases. Government and health officials, non-governmental organizations, and individuals around the world observe the day, often with education on AIDS prevention and control.

World AIDS Day is one of the eleven official global public health campaigns marked by the World Health Organization (WHO), along with World Health Day, World Blood Donor Day, World Immunization Week, World Tuberculosis Day, World No Tobacco Day, World Malaria Day, World Hepatitis Day, World Antimicrobial Awareness Week, World Patient Safety Day and World Chagas Disease Day.

As of 2020, AIDS has killed between 27.2 million and 47.8 million people worldwide, and an estimated 37.7 million people are living with HIV, making it one of the most important global public health issues in recorded history. Thanks to recent improved access to antiretroviral treatment in many regions of the world, the death rate from AIDS epidemic has decreased by 64% since its peak in 2004 (1.9 million in 2004, compared to 680 000 in 2020).

== History ==
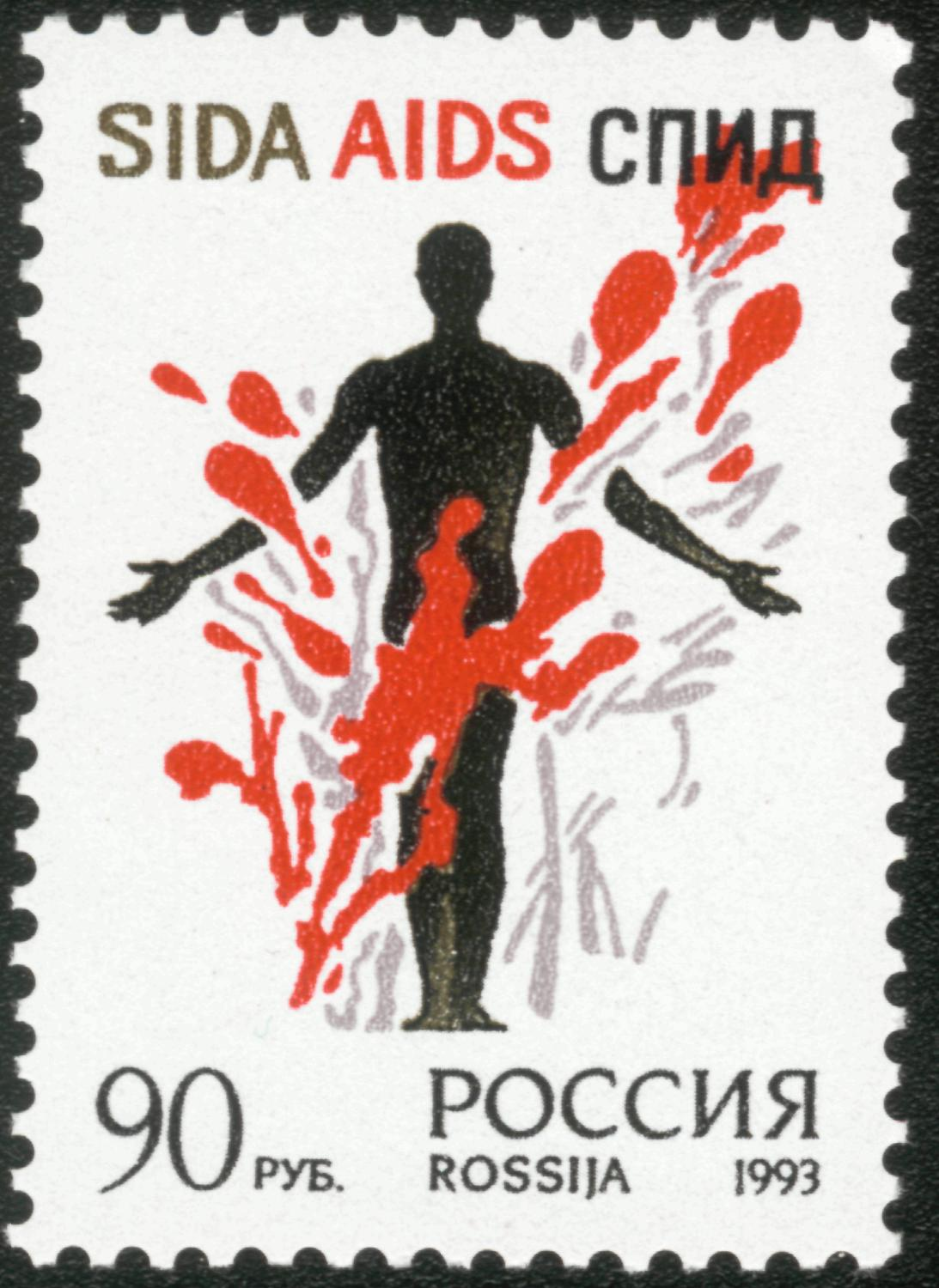
Russian stamp, 1993

World AIDS Day was first conceived in August 1987 by James W. Bunn and Thomas Netter, two public information officers for the Global Programme on AIDS at the World Health Organization in Geneva, Switzerland. Bunn and Netter took their idea to Dr. Jonathan Mann, Director of the Global Programme on AIDS (now known as UNAIDS). Mann liked the concept, approved it, and agreed with the recommendation that the first observance of World AIDS Day should be on 1 December 1988. Bunn, a former television broadcast journalist from San Francisco, had recommended the date of 1 December that believing it would maximize coverage of World AIDS Day by western news media, sufficiently long following the US elections but before the Christmas holidays.

In its first two years, the theme of World AIDS Day focused on children and young people. While the choice of this theme was criticized at the time by some for ignoring the fact that people of all ages may become infected with HIV, the theme helped alleviate some of the stigma surrounding the disease and boost recognition of the problem as a family disease.

The Joint United Nations Programme on HIV/AIDS (UNAIDS) became operational in 1996, and it took over the planning and promotion of World AIDS Day. Rather than focus on a single day, UNAIDS created the World AIDS Campaign in 1997 to focus on year-round communications, prevention and education. In 2004, the World AIDS Campaign became an independent organization.

Each year since 1988, Popes have released a greeting message for patients and doctors on World AIDS Day. In 2016, a collection of HIV, rabies, COVID and other respiratory virus NGOs (including Panagea Global AIDS and the AIDS and Rights Alliance for Southern Africa) started a campaign to rename World AIDS Day to World HIV Day. They claim the change will emphasize social justice issues, and the advancement of treatments like pre-exposure prophylaxis.

In the US, the White House began marking World AIDS Day with the iconic display of a 28 foot (8.5 m) AIDS Ribbon on the building's North Portico in 2007. White House aide Steven M. Levine, then serving in President George W. Bush's administration, proposed the display to symbolize the United States' commitment to combat the world AIDS epidemic through its landmark PEPFAR program. The White House display, now an annual tradition across four presidential administrations, quickly garnered attention, as it was the first banner, sign or symbol to prominently hang from the White House since the Abraham Lincoln administration.

Since 1993, the President of the United States has made an official proclamation for World AIDS Day (see section #US Presidential Proclamations for World AIDS Day for copies of those proclamations). On 30 November 2017, President Donald Trump along with local community college students proclaimed World AIDS Day for 1 December. In 2025, however, the Trump administration instructed American officials to not commemorate it, following cuts to HIV prevention.

== Themes ==
All the World AIDS Day campaigns focus on a specific theme, chosen following consultations with UNAIDS, WHO, and a large number of grassroots, national and international agencies involved in the prevention and treatment of HIV/AIDS. As of 2008, each year's theme is chosen by the Global Steering Committee of the World AIDS Campaign (WAC).

For each World AIDS Day from 2005 through 2010, the theme was "Stop AIDS. Keep the Promise", designed to encourage political leaders to keep their commitment to achieving universal access to HIV/AIDS prevention, treatment, care, and support by the year 2010.

As of 2012, the multi-year theme for World AIDS Day is "Getting to Zero: Zero new HIV infections. Zero deaths from AIDS-related illness. Zero discrimination." The US Federal theme for the year 2014 was "Focus, Partner, Achieve: An AIDS-Free Generation".

The themes are not limited to a single day but are used year-round in international efforts to highlight HIV/AIDS awareness within the context of other major global events including the G8 Summit, as well as local campaigns like the Student Stop AIDS Campaign in the UK.

=== World AIDS Day Themes ===
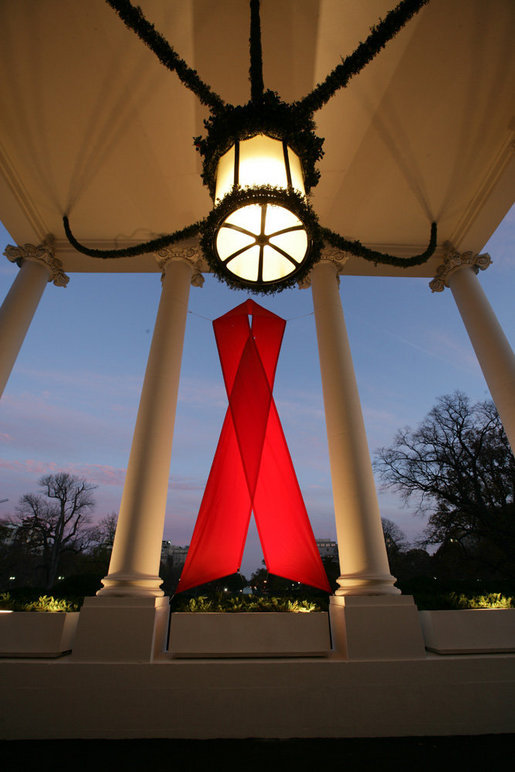
A large red ribbon hangs between columns in the north portico of the White House for World AIDS Day, 30 November 2007

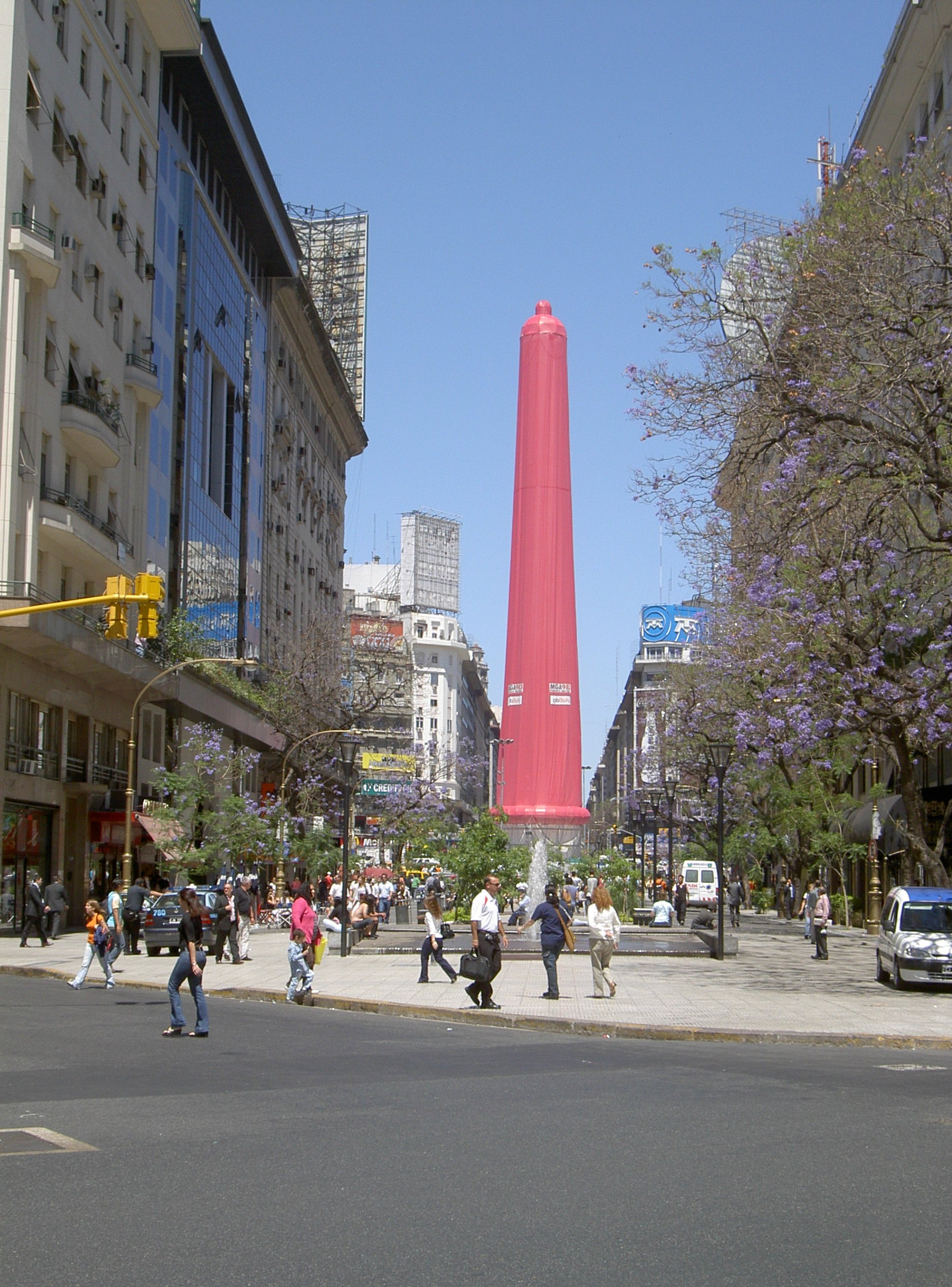
A 67 m long condom sculpture on the Obelisk of Buenos Aires, Argentina, part of an awareness campaign for the 2005 World AIDS Day

No	Year	Theme	Aspect of Note
1	1988	Communication	The first year celebrated and the first time with UN recognition.
2	1989	Youth	
3	1990	Women and AIDS	
4	1991	Sharing the Challenge	
5	1992	Community Commitment	
6	1993	Time to Act	
7	1994	AIDS and the Family	
8	1995	Shared Rights, Shared Responsibilities	
9	1996	One World. One Hope.	
10	1997	Children Living in a World with AIDS	
11	1998	Force for Change: World AIDS Campaign With Young People	
12	1999	Listen, Learn, Live: World AIDS Campaign with Children & Young People	
13	2000	AIDS: Men Make a Difference	
14	2001	I Care. Do You?	
15	2002	Stigma and Discrimination	
16	2003	Stigma and Discrimination	
17	2004	Women, Girls, HIV and AIDS	
18	2005	Stop AIDS. Keep the Promise	
19	2006	Stop AIDS. Keep the Promise – Accountability	
20	2007	Stop AIDS. Keep the Promise – Leadership	
21	2008	Stop AIDS. Keep the Promise – Lead – Empower – Deliver	
22	2009	Universal Access and Human Rights	
23	2010	Universal Access and Human Rights	
24	2011	Getting to Zero	
25	2012	Together We Will End AIDS	
26	2013	Zero Discrimination	Via this day's "Zero Discrimination" campaign, UNAIDS launched the first UN "Zero Discrimination Day" held on 1 March 2014
27	2014	Close the Gap	
28	2015	On the Fast Track to End AIDS	
29	2016	Hands up for #HIVprevention	
30	2017	My Health, My Right	
31	2018	Know your Status	
32	2019	Communities Make the Difference	
33	2020	Global Solidarity Shared Responsibility	Described as "like no other", due to COVID-19.
34	2021	End inequalities. End AIDS. End pandemics. (UN) Ending the HIV Epidemic: Equitable Access, Everyone's Voice (US)	
35	2022	Equalize	
36	2023	Let Communities Lead	
37	2024	Take the Rights Path	
38	2025	Overcoming disruption, transforming the AIDS response	
39	2026	Ending AIDS starts with access	

== See also ==
- AIDS Awareness Week
- List of LGBTQ awareness periods
- National AIDS Testing Day (United States)
- Epidemiology of HIV/AIDS
- World Health Day
- Day Without Art
- HIV.gov
- World AIDS Vaccine Day
