= Blood donation in Sri Lanka =

Blood transfusion was first performed in Sri Lanka in late 1950. It became more widely known to the public in 1959 after the assassination of Prime Minister S.W.R.D. Bandaranaike, when an appeal was made to the public to donate blood. The country's blood bank system has since expanded from a single initial site to multiple blood donation centres and laboratories nationwide, operating under the auspices of the National Blood Transfusion Service (NBTS). As of 2014, the NBTS collects over 350,000 voluntary blood donations every year.

== History ==
Initially, there was only one blood bank in Sri Lanka, confined to a room close to the surgical unit of the National Hospital of Sri Lanka (NHSL). In 1960, the NHSL blood bank was shifted to its current building, near the hospital's main entrance. In 1967, a "red donor booklet" was introduced as a certificate for free blood donors. Other donors were paid a minimum of 10 rupees for each donation. In 1968, the blood bank was semi-decentralized under the Sri Lankan Ministry of Health and placed under the direction of a superintendent blood transfusion service. It had a staff of 124 at that time.

In 1979, paid donation was discontinued and voluntary donation was encouraged to ensure the safety of collected blood. In 1980, the number of hospital-based blood banks reached 20, and 12 emergency bleeding centres were also established. Mobile blood donation programs were initiated with two mobile blood collection teams.

By 1982, volunteer non-remunerated blood donations accounted for 97% of all transfusions, and the "Anti A1" reagent was manufactured for the first time in Sri Lanka using kollu seeds. In 1985, disposable plastic bags were introduced to all Sri Lankan blood banks. Screening of blood for hepatitis B was initiated. In 1987, the emergence of AIDS led to the introduction of screening of all collected blood for HIV 1 and 2 antibodies. In 1988, the Central Blood Bank's component laboratory facility was extended to some of the larger blood banks (Colombo North and Kandy).

In 1990, the component laboratory facility was further extended to blood banks at Karapitiya, Kurunegala, CI Maharagama, Peradeniya, Anuradhapura, Matara and Badulla. By this time there were 32 blood banks and 10 emergency bleeding centres. The Central Blood Bank functioned as the training centre for medical and paramedical personnel of the National Blood Transfusion Service (NBTS). In 1999, the headquarters of the NBTS were established at the National Blood Centre, absorbing most of the vital laboratories and the majority of the staff from the Central Blood Bank. The NBTS thus became a fully decentralized unit.

In 2009, a distributed network of cluster centres was established, and more authority was given to these cluster centres for effective delivery of blood collection and transfusion services to various parts of the country. In 2012, the Anura Bandaranaike Memorial Blood Bank was opened in Wathupitiwela. In June 2014, Sri Lanka hosted the World Blood Donor Day, with the theme "Safe Blood for Saving Mothers".
