= Malaria Day in the Americas =

International annual commemoration

Malaria Day in the Americas is commemorated annually on November 6 to promote awareness, recognize past and current efforts to prevent and control malaria in the region of the Americas, build commitment, and to mobilize action to advance malaria goals and targets as the region works towards elimination. Awareness of this disease is very important in the region of the Americas, where an estimated 120 million people in 21 endemic countries are at risk of malaria. In 2012, there were 469,000 confirmed malaria cases in the region with 108 deaths. Nonetheless, declining incidence of disease and malaria-related mortality has led to low prioritization of malaria on national health agendas in the Americas.

Guyana has recognized this day since 2003, commemorating the day that Nobel Prize winner, Dr. Charles Laveran first observed the malaria parasite in blood. This date was recommended by Guyana to be the official date for the region, which is now celebrated by the Pan American Health Organization (PAHO) and Member States since 2007. This day is a mechanism for countries in Latin America and the Caribbean to engage stakeholders in the fight against malaria. Ministries of Health and other actors, such as international donors and technical partners of Amazon Malaria Initiative, are encouraged to hold local outreach events on November 6 in order to achieve critical mass and raise awareness of the issue of malaria prevention and control, which have included events in Guyana and Belize.

== History ==
Malaria Day in the Americas was envisioned by the 46th Directing Council of the Pan American Health Organization in 2005 and established in October 2007 by the 27th Pan American Sanitary Conference held in Washington, DC. November 6 was proposed by Member State Guyana and approved as it coincides with the day Charles Louise Alphonse first observed the presence of malaria parasites in the blood of patients

Malaria Day in the Americas is a separate event from World Malaria Day, which was established the same year and is marked by the World Health Organization on April 25.

Following the 2013 Malaria Day in the Americas, participating countries were encouraged to engage in a year-round campaign against the disease to attain the following objectives:

1. Improve the communication process and extension of advocacy work to all stakeholders and target audiences.
2. Enhance visibility/interest on Malaria in the Region of Americas and the global scourge that the disease brings to peoples of the world.
3. Increase awareness and understanding of the key issues among target audience/population.
4. Catalyze change of attitudes and modification of behaviors.
5. Generate advocacy/support from the public, policy makers, clients and strategic partners.
6. Encourage increased and enduring support to efforts against malaria, including the elimination of local transmission in areas where such is feasible.

== Malaria Champions of the Americas ==
Through the annual Malaria Champion of the Americas competition, the Pan American Health Organization (PAHO), the United Nations Foundation, the George Washington University Milken Institute School of Public Health (MISPH), and the Johns Hopkins University School of Public Health's Center for Communication Programs (JHU-CCP) (the PAHO Foundation was a previous sponsor of this Forum) seek to recognize organizations and initiatives in the region of the Americas that exemplify best practices and success stories in malaria prevention and control. The jury selects three finalists from among all nominated organizations, and then uses pre-determined criteria to award one “Malaria Champion of the Americas” for having made the most significant contributions to malaria prevention and control in the region of the Americas during that year. An awards ceremony is held at PAHO headquarters in Washington, DC on November 6, or on an alternate date when the sixth falls on a Friday or weekend. The Malaria Champions of the Americas awards ceremony is webcast live to encourage virtual participation throughout the region.

The 2013 Malaria Day in the Americas was celebrated on November 6 at PAHO headquarters in Washington DC, on that day, the Colombia Malaria Project was honored as Malaria Champion of the Americas 2013. There was special recognition given to the malaria program of the Dominican Republic for its efforts in cross-border coordination with Haiti, as well as to the State Health Department of Acre, Brazil for its sustained excellence in malaria control.

The 2014 Malaria Day in the Americas event focused on Accelerating the Elimination of Malaria. The 2014 Malaria Champion of the Americas was the Centro Nacional Para el Control de las Enfermedades Tropicales (CENCET) from the Dominican Republic

The 2015 Malaria Day in the Americas forum was held on November 5, 2015 at PAHO/WHO Headquarters in Washington, DC and featured videos, presentations, and discussions on Malaria Networks and Advocates, the regional launch of Roll Back Malaria's Action and Investment to Defeat Malaria (AIM) 2016 - 2030, and the work of ‘Malaria Champions of the Americas 2015.’ The finalists included the National Malaria Control Program of Brazil, the Honduras Ministry of Health Health Surveillance Unit, and the National Malaria Eradication Service (SENEPA) of Paraguay. The National Malaria Control Program from Brazil won the overall prize as the 2015 Malaria Champion of the Americas.

The 2016 Malaria Day in the Americas forum was held on November 3, 2016 at the PAHO/WHO Headquarters in Washington, DC and featured videos, presentations, and discussions around the theme "End Malaria for Good." The three countries recognized this year as "Malaria Champions of the Americas 2016", included Costa Rica, El Salvador, and Suriname.
