= World Tuberculosis Day =

Global public health campaign

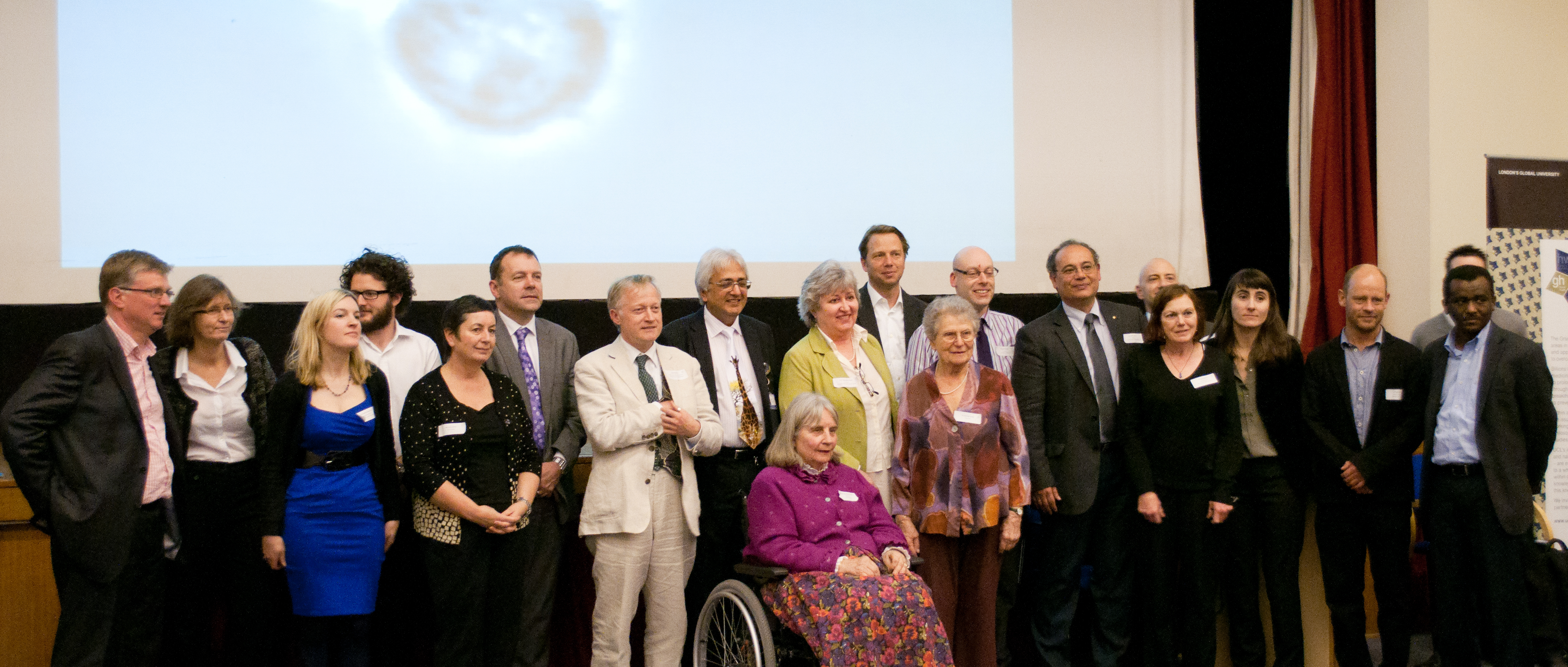
- Participants at World Tuberculosis Day 2012
- Observed by: All UN Member States
- Date: 24 March
- Next time: 24 March 2027
- Frequency: annual

World Tuberculosis Day, observed on 24 March each year, is designed to build public awareness about the global epidemic of tuberculosis (TB) and efforts to eliminate the disease. In 2018, 10 million people fell ill with TB, and 1.5 million died from the disease, mostly in low and middle-income countries. This also makes it the leading cause of death from an infectious disease.

World TB Day is one of eleven official global public health campaigns marked by the World Health Organization (WHO).

== Background ==
24 March commemorates the day in 1882 when Dr Robert Koch astounded the scientific community by announcing to a small group of scientists at the University of Berlin's Institute of Hygiene that he had discovered the cause of tuberculosis, the TB bacillus. According to Koch's colleague, Paul Ehrlich, "At this memorable session, Koch appeared before the public with an announcement which marked a turning-point in the story of a virulent human infectious disease. In clear, simple words Koch explained the aetiology of tuberculosis with convincing force, presenting many of his microscope slides and other pieces of evidence." At the time of Koch's announcement in Berlin, TB was raging through Europe and the Americas, causing the death of one out of every seven people. Koch's discovery opened the way toward diagnosing and curing tuberculosis.

== History ==
In 1982, on the one-hundredth anniversary of Robert Koch's presentation, the International Union Against Tuberculosis and Lung Disease (IUATLD) proposed that 24 March be proclaimed an official World TB Day. This was part of a year-long centennial effort by the IUATLD and the World Health Organization (WHO) under the theme "Defeat TB: Now and Forever." World TB Day was not officially recognized as an annual occurrence by WHO's World Health Assembly and the United Nations until over a decade later.

In the fall of 1995, WHO and the Royal Netherlands Tuberculosis Foundation (KNCV) hosted the first World TB Day advocacy planning meeting in The Hague, Netherlands; an event they would continue co-sponsor over the next few years. In 1996, WHO, KNCV, the IUATLD and other concerned organizations joined to conduct a wide range of World TB Day activities.

For World TB Day 1997, WHO held a news conference in Berlin during which WHO Director-General Hiroshi Nakajima declared that "DOTS is the biggest health breakthrough of this decade, according to lives we will be able to save." WHO's Global TB Programme Director, Dr. Arata Kochi, promised that, "Today the situation of the global TB epidemic is about to change, because we have made a breakthrough. It is the breakthrough of health management systems that makes it possible to control TB not only in wealthy countries, but in all parts of the developing world, where 95 percent of all TB cases now exist."

By 1998, nearly 200 organizations conducted public outreach activities on World TB Day. During its World TB Day 1998 news conference in London, WHO for the first time identified the top twenty-two countries with the world's highest TB burden. The next year, over 60 key TB advocates from 18 countries attended the three-day WHO/KNCV planning meeting for World TB Day 1999.

U.S. President Bill Clinton marked World TB Day 2000 by administering the WHO-recommended Directly Observed Therapy, Short-Course (DOTS) treatment to patients at the Mahavir Hospital in Hyderabad, India. According to Clinton, "These are human tragedies, economic calamities, and far more than crises for you, they are crises for the world. The spread of disease is the one global problem for which ... no nation is immune."

In Canada, the National Collaborating Centre for Determinants of Health noted on World TB Day 2014 that 64% of TB cases reported nationally were among foreign-born individuals and 23% among Aboriginal people, highlighting TB as a key area of concern about health equity.

Today the Stop TB Partnership, a network of organizations and countries fighting TB (the IUATLD is a member and WHO houses the Stop TB Partnership secretariat in Geneva), organizes the Day to highlight the scope of the disease and how to prevent and cure it.

== Themes by year ==
Each World TB Day addresses a different theme. The following is a list of annual themes:

- 1997: Use DOTS more widely!
- 1998: DOTS success stories
- 1999: Stop TB, use DOTS
- 2000: Forging new partnerships to Stop TB
- 2001: DOTS: TB cure for all
- 2002: Stop TB, fight poverty
- 2003: DOTS cured me – it will cure you too!
- 2004: Every breath counts – Stop TB now!
- 2005: Frontline TB care providers: Heroes in the fight against TB
- 2006: Actions for life – Towards a world free of TB
- 2007: TB anywhere is TB everywhere
- 2008–2009: I am stopping TB
- 2010: Innovate to accelerate action
- 2011: Transforming the fight towards elimination
- 2012: Call for a world free of TB
- 2013: Stop TB in my lifetime
- 2014: Reach the three million: A TB test, treatment and cure for all
- 2015: Gear up to end TB
- 2016: Unite to End TB
- 2017: Unite to End TB
- 2018: Wanted: Leaders for a TB-free world
- 2019: It's time
- 2020: It's time to end TB!
- 2021: The clock is ticking
- 2022: Invest to end TB. Save Lives
- 2023-2024: Yes! We can end TB!
- 2025: Yes! We can end TB: Commit, Invest, Deliver
- 2026: Yes! We Can End TB: Led by Countries Powered by People

=== 2008–2009: I am stopping TB ===
The two-year World TB Day campaign "I am stopping TB", launched in 2008, highlighted the message that the campaign belonged to people everywhere doing their part to stop TB.

=== 2010: Innovate to accelerate action ===
The World TB Day 2010 recognized people and partners who had introduced a variety of innovations in a variety of settings to stop TB.

On the occasion of World TB Day 2010, the International Committee of the Red Cross (ICRC) declared that attempts to stem the spread of tuberculosis across the globe are likely to fall well short of what is needed unless authorities in affected countries significantly increase their efforts to stop the deadly disease from breeding inside prisons. As a result of overcrowding and poor nutrition, TB rates in many prisons are 10 to 40 times higher than in the general public. The ICRC had been fighting TB in prisons in the Caucasus region, Central Asia, Latin America, Asia Pacific and Africa for more than a decade, either directly or by supporting local programmes.

=== 2011: Transforming the fight ===
For the World TB Day 2011 campaign, the goal was to inspire innovation in TB research and care.

=== 2012: Tell the world what you want to see in your lifetime ===
For World TB Day 2012, individuals were called upon to join the global fight to stop TB in their lifetime.

=== 2013: Stop TB in my lifetime ===
The World TB Day 2013 campaign provided an opportunity to mark progress towards global targets for reductions in TB cases and deaths: TB mortality fell over 40% worldwide since 1990, and incidence was declining. Further progress would depend on addressing critical funding gaps: an estimated 1.6 billion US dollars needed to implement existing TB interventions.

=== 2014: Reach the three million ===
Of the 9 million people a year who get sick with TB, 3 million of them are "missed" by health systems. The focus of World TB Day 2014 was for countries and partners to take forward innovative approaches to reach the 3 million and ensure that everyone suffering from TB has access to TB diagnosis, treatment and cure.

=== 2015: Gear up to end TB ===
World TB Day 2015 was seen as an opportunity to raise awareness about the burden of TB worldwide and the status of TB prevention and control efforts, highlighting WHO's vision of a world free of TB with zero deaths and suffering.

=== 2017: Unite to end TB ===
World TB 2017 focused on joining efforts to raise awareness and eliminate tuberculosis.

=== 2018: Wanted: Leaders for a TB-free world ===
World TB 2018 focused on building commitment to end TB, not only at the political level with Heads of State and Ministers of Health, but at all levels from Mayors, Governors, parliamentarians and community leaders, to people affected with TB, civil society advocates, health workers, doctors or nurses, NGOs and other partners.

=== 2019: It's time ===
The theme for World TB day 2019 was "It's time". The emphasis for this year's event is to pressure world leaders to "act on [their] commitments".

=== 2020: It's time to End TB ===
The theme for World TB day 2020 was "It's time to End TB!"

=== 2021: The clock is ticking ===
The theme of World TB Day 2021 was 'The Clock is Ticking', conveys the sense that the world is running out of time to act on the commitments to end TB made by global leaders.

=== 2022: Invest to end TB. Save Lives ===
The theme of World TB Day 2022 was "Invest to End TB. Save Lives"

=== 2023-2024: Yes! We can end TB! ===
The theme of World TB Day 2023 and 2024 was "Yes! We can end TB!"

=== 2026: Yes! We Can End TB: Led by Countries Powered by People ===
Source:

== See also ==
- Epidemiology of tuberculosis
- The Global Fund to Fight AIDS, Tuberculosis and Malaria
