= April =

Fourth month in the Julian and Gregorian calendars

<<	April					>>
Su	Mo	Tu	We	Th	Fr	Sa
			1	2	3	4
5	6	7	8	9	10	11
12	13	14	15	16	17	18
19	20	21	22	23	24	25
26	27	28	29	30
2026

April is the fourth month of the year in the Gregorian and Julian calendars. Its length is 30 days.

April is commonly associated with the season of spring in the Northern Hemisphere, and autumn in the Southern Hemisphere, where it is the seasonal equivalent to October in the Northern Hemisphere and vice versa.

== History ==
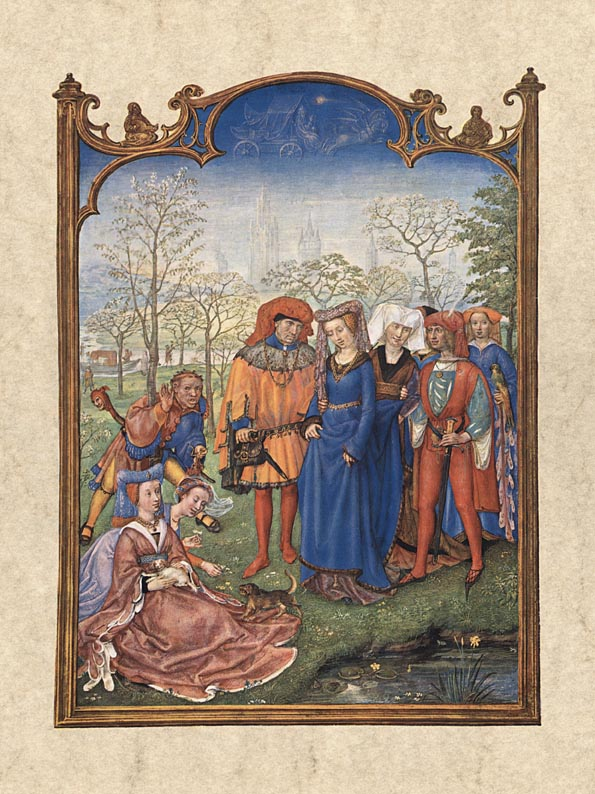
April, Brevarium Grimani, fol. 5v (Flemish)

In recent decades, the number of warm temperature records in April has outpaced cold temperature records over a growing portion of Earth's surface.

Chart shows changes in global average temperature annually in April of each year

The Romans gave this month the Latin name Aprilis but the derivation of this name is uncertain. The traditional etymology is from the verb aperire, 'to open', in allusion to its being the season when trees and flowers begin to "open", which is supported by comparison with the modern Greek use of άνοιξη (ánixi, 'opening') for spring. Since some of the Roman months were named in honor of divinities, and as April was sacred to the goddess Venus, her Veneralia being held on the first day, it has been suggested that Aprilis was originally her month Aphrilis, from her equivalent Greek goddess name Aphrodite (Aphros), or the Etruscan name Apru. Jacob Grimm suggests the name of a hypothetical god or hero, Aper or Aprus.

April was the second month of the earliest Roman calendar, before Ianuarius and Februarius were added by King Numa Pompilius about 700 BC. It became the fourth month of the calendar year (the year when twelve months are displayed in order) during the time of the decemvirs about 450 BC, when it was 29 days long. The 30th day was added back during the reform of the calendar undertaken by Julius Caesar in the mid-40s BC, which produced the Julian calendar.

The Anglo-Saxons called April ēastre-monaþ. The Venerable Bede says in The Reckoning of Time that this month ēastre is the root of the word Easter. He further states that the month was named after a goddess Eostre whose feast was in that month. It is also attested by Einhard in his work Vita Karoli Magni.

St George's day is the twenty-third of the month; and St Mark's Eve, with its superstition that the ghosts of those who are doomed to die within the year will be seen to pass into the church, falls on the twenty-fourth.

In China the symbolic ploughing of the earth by the emperor and princes of the blood took place in their third month, which frequently corresponds to April. In Finnish, April is huhtikuu, meaning slash-and-burn moon, when gymnosperms for beat and burn clearing of farmland were felled.

In Slovene, the most established traditional name is mali traven, the month when plants start growing. It was first written in 1466 in the Škofja Loka manuscript.

The month April originally had 30 days; Numa Pompilius made it 29 days long; finally, Julius Caesar's calendar reform made it 30 days long again, which was not changed in the calendar revision of Augustus Caesar in 8 BC.

In Ancient Rome, the festival of Cerealia was held for seven days from mid-to-late April, but exact dates are still being determined. Feriae Latinae was also held in April, with the date varying. Other ancient Roman observances include Veneralia (April 1), Megalesia (April 10–16), Fordicidia (April 15), Parilia (April 21), Vinalia Urbana (April 23), Robigalia (April 25), and Serapia (April 25). Floralia was held April 27 during the Republican era, or April 28 on the Julian calendar, and lasted until May 3. However, these dates do not correspond to the modern Gregorian calendar.

The Lyrids meteor shower appears on April 16 – April 26 each year, with the peak generally occurring on April 22. The Eta Aquariids meteor shower also appears in April. It is visible from April 21 to May 20 each year, with peak activity on or around May 6. The Pi Puppids appear on April 23, but only in years around the parent comet's perihelion date. The Virginids also shower at various dates in April.

The "Days of April" (journées d'avril) is a name assigned in French history to a series of insurrections at Lyons, Paris and elsewhere, against the government of Louis Philippe in 1834, which led to violent repressive measures, and to a famous trial known as the procès d'avril.

== Symbols ==
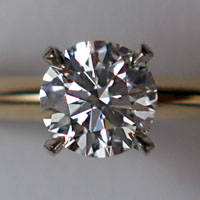
Faceted diamond

April's birthstone is the diamond. The birth flower is the common daisy (Bellis perennis) or the sweet pea. The zodiac signs are Aries (until 19 April) and Taurus (20 April onward).

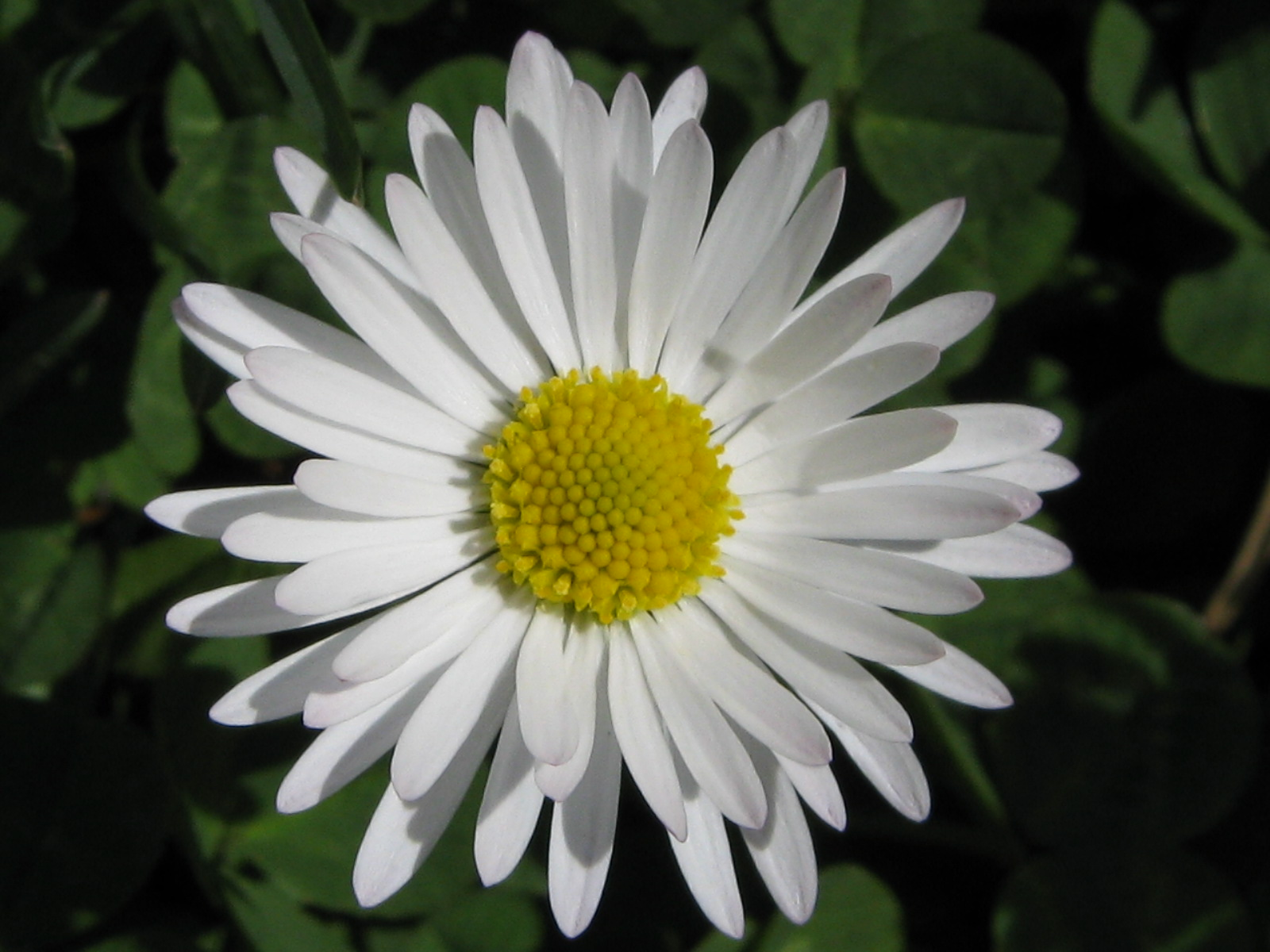
Daisy flower

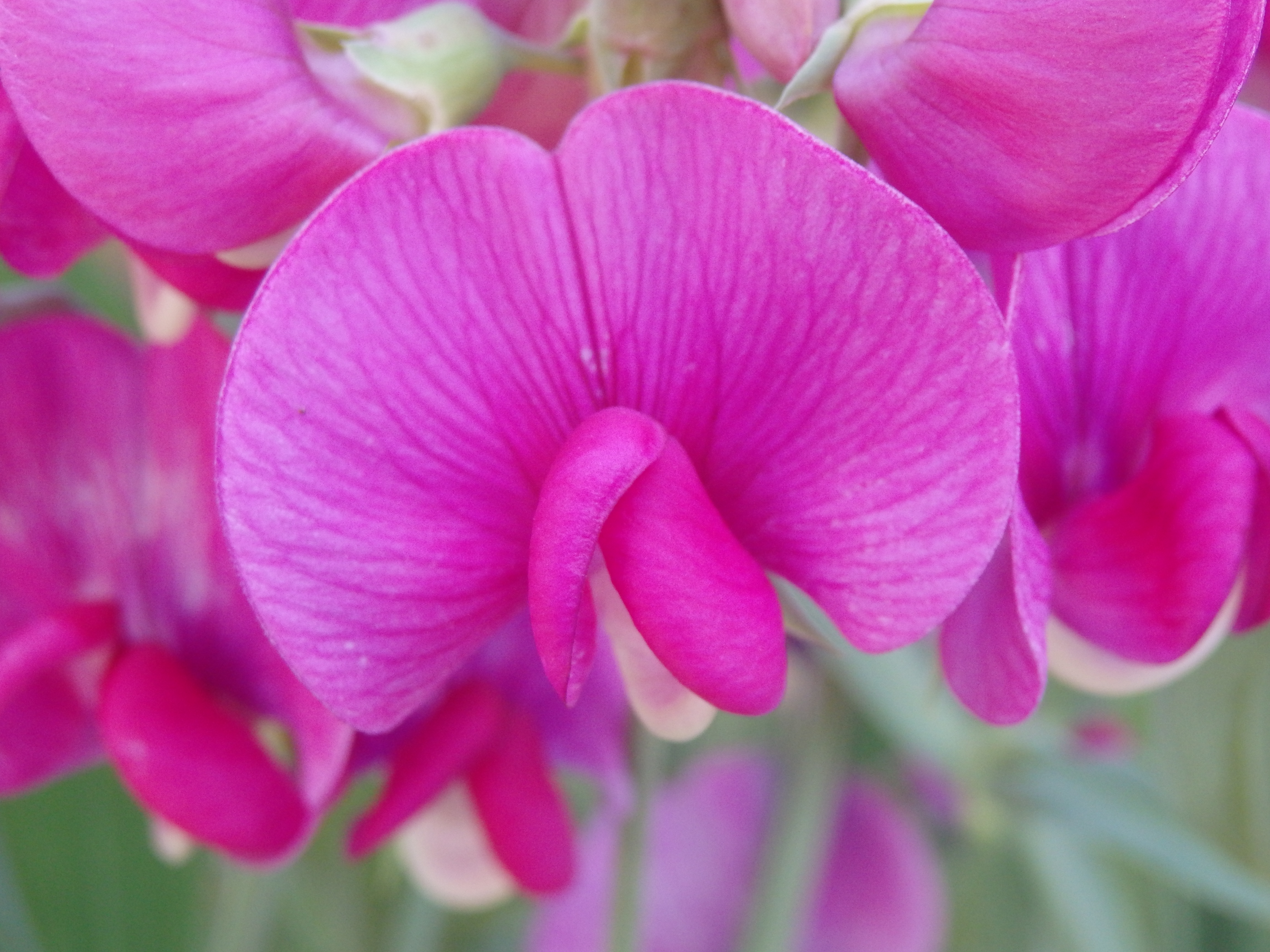
Sweet pea

== Observances ==
This list does not necessarily imply official status or general observance.

=== Month-long ===
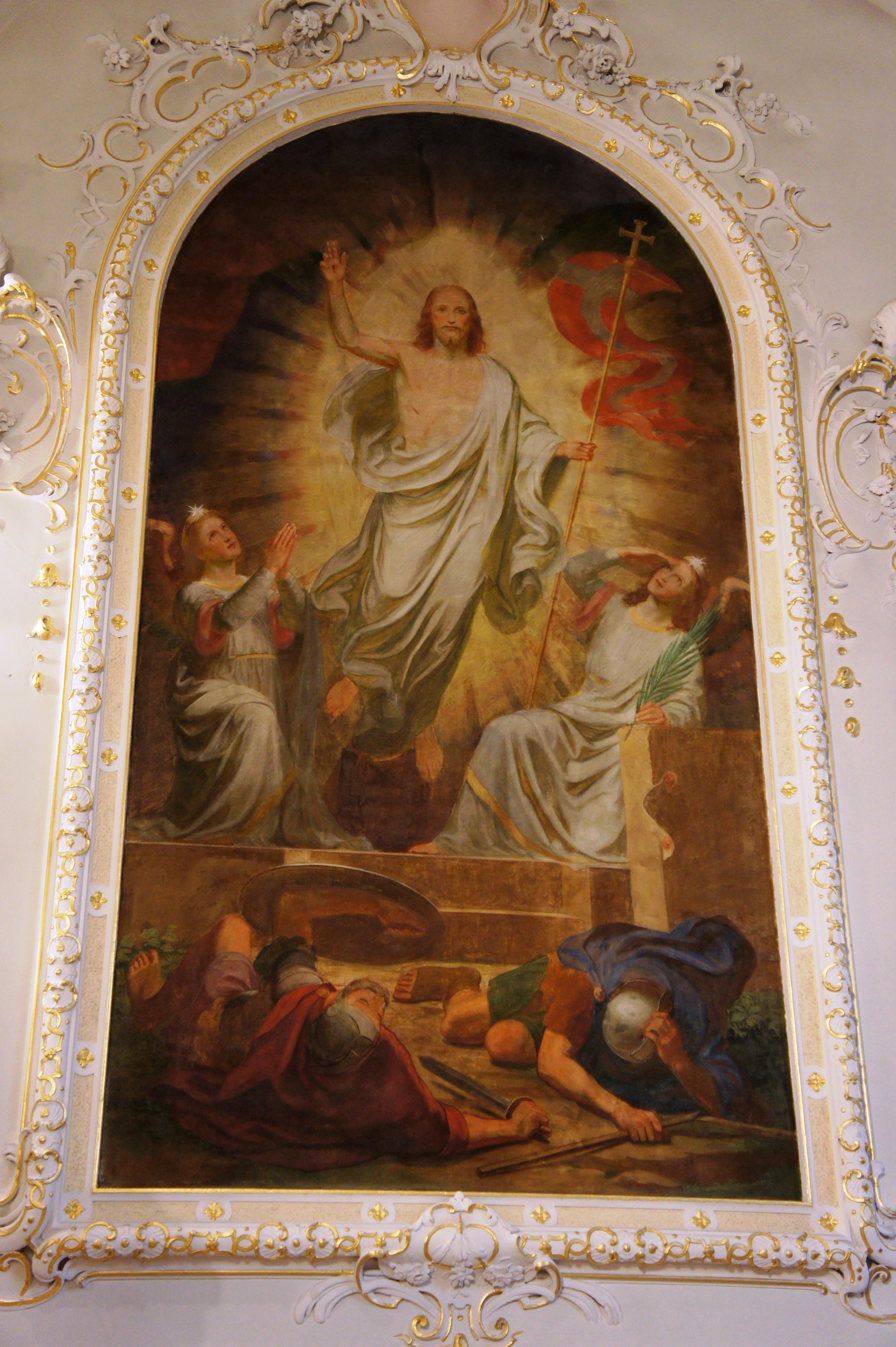
A fresco in a Catholic church in Switzerland representing the Resurrection of the Lord

- In Catholic, Protestant and Orthodox tradition, April is the Month of the Resurrection of the Lord. April and March are the months in which the moveable Feast of Easter Sunday is celebrated.
- National Pet Month (UK)

==== United States ====
- Arab American Heritage Month
- Autism Awareness Month
- Cancer Control Month
- Community College Awareness Month
- Confederate History Month (Alabama, Florida, Georgia, Louisiana, Mississippi, Texas, Virginia)
- Financial Literacy Month
- Jazz Appreciation Month
- Mathematics and Statistics Awareness Month
- Month of the Military Child
- National Poetry Month
- National Poetry Writing Month
- Occupational Therapy Month
- National Prevent Child Abuse Month
- National Volunteer Month
- Parkinson's Disease Awareness Month
- Rosacea Awareness Month
- Sexual Assault Awareness Month

==== United States food months ====
- Fresh Florida Tomato Month
- National Food Month
- National Grilled Cheese Month
- National Pecan Month
- National Soft Pretzel Month
- National Soyfoods Month

=== Non-Gregorian ===
(All Baha'i, Islamic, and Jewish observances begin at the sundown prior to the date listed, and end at sundown of the date in question unless otherwise noted.)

- List of observances set by the Bahá'í calendar
- List of observances set by the Chinese calendar
- List of observances set by the Hebrew calendar
- List of observances set by the Islamic calendar
- List of observances set by the Solar Hijri calendar

=== Movable ===
==== Variable; 2021 dates shown ====
- Youth Homelessness Matters Day
- National Health Day (Kiribati): April 6
- Oral, Head and Neck Cancer Awareness Week (United States): April 13–19
- National Park Week (United States): April 18–26
- Crime Victims' Rights Week (United States): April 19–25
- National Volunteer Week: April 19–25
- European Immunization Week: April 20–26
- Day of Silence (United States): April 24
- Pay It Forward Day: April 28 (International observance)
- Denim Day: April 29 (International observance)
- Day of Dialogue (United States)
- Vaccination Week In The Americas
- See: List of movable Western Christian observances
- See: List of movable Eastern Christian observances

==== First Wednesday ====
- National Day of Hope (United States)

==== First Saturday ====
- Ulcinj Municipality Day (Ulcinj, Montenegro)

==== First Sunday ====
- Daylight saving time ends (Australia and New Zealand)
- Geologists Day (former Soviet Union countries)
- Kanamara Matsuri (Kawasaki, Japan)
- Opening Day (United States)

==== First full week ====
- National Library Week (United States)
  - National Library Workers Day (United States) (Tuesday of National Library week, April 9 in 2024)
  - National Bookmobile Day (Wednesday of National Library week, April 10 in 2024)
- National Public Health Week (United States)
- National Public Safety Telecommunicators Week (United States)

===== Second Wednesday =====
- International Day of Pink

===== Second Thursday =====
- National Former Prisoner of War Recognition Day (United States)

===== Second Friday =====
- Fast and Prayer Day (Liberia)
- Air Force Day (Russia)
- Kamakura Matsuri at Tsurugaoka Hachiman (Kamakura, Japan), lasts until third Sunday.

==== Second Sunday ====
- Children's Day (Peru)

==== Week of April 14 ====
- Pan American Week (United States)

==== Third Wednesday ====
- Administrative Professionals Day (New Zealand)

==== Third Thursday ====
- National High Five Day (United States)

==== Third Saturday ====
- Record Store Day (International observance)

==== Last full week of April ====
- Administrative Professionals Week (Malaysia, North America)
- World Immunization Week

==== Week of April 23 ====
- Canada Book Week (Canada)

==== Week of the new moon ====
- International Dark Sky Week (United States)

==== Third Monday ====
- Patriots' Day (Massachusetts, Maine, United States)
- Queen's Official Birthday (Saint Helena, Ascension and Tristan da Cunha)
- Sechseläuten (Zurich, Switzerland)

===== Wednesday of last full week of April =====
- Administrative Professionals Day (Hong Kong, North America)

==== First Thursday after April 18 ====
- First Day of Summer (Iceland)

===== Fourth Thursday =====
- Take Our Daughters and Sons to Work Day (United States)

===== Last Friday =====
- Arbor Day (United States)
- Día de la Chupina (Rosario, Argentina)

==== Last Friday in April to first Sunday in May ====
- Arbour Week in Ontario

===== Last Saturday =====
- Children's Day (Colombia)
- National Rebuilding Day (United States)
- National Sense of Smell Day (United States)
- World Tai Chi and Qigong Day

===== Last Sunday =====
- Flag Day (Åland, Finland)
- Turkmen Racing Horse Festival (Turkmenistan)

===== April 27 (April 26 if April 27 is a Sunday) =====
- Koningsdag (Netherlands)

===== Last Monday =====
- Confederate Memorial Day (Alabama, Georgia (U.S. state), and Mississippi, United States)

===== Last Wednesday =====
- International Noise Awareness Day

=== Fixed ===
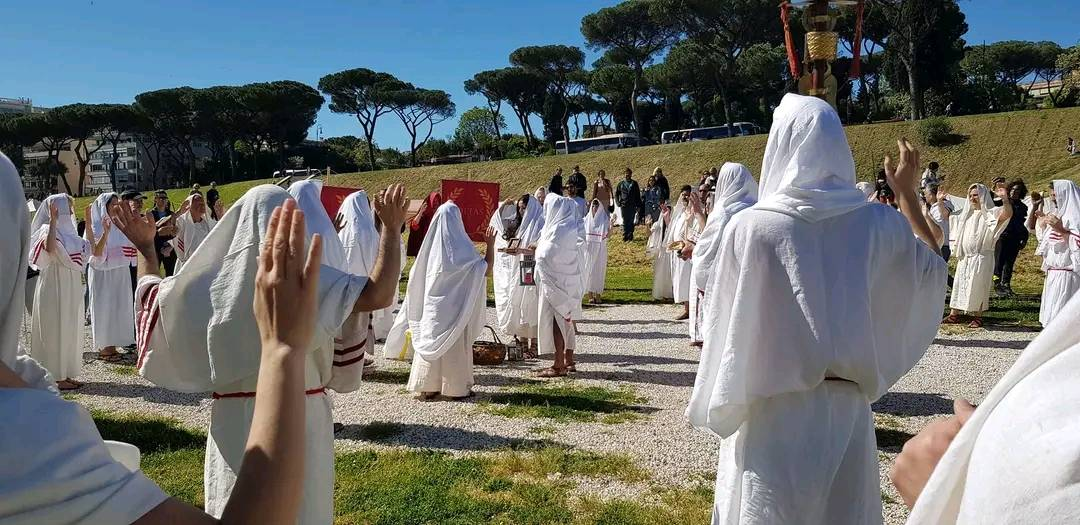
Celebration of the 2777th Natale di Roma at the Circus Maximus

- April 1
  - April Fools' Day
  - Arbor Day (Tanzania)
  - Civil Service Day (Thailand)
  - Cyprus National Day (Cyprus)
  - Edible Book Day
  - Fossil Fools Day
  - Kha b-Nisan (Assyrian people)
  - National Civil Service Day (Thailand)
  - Odisha Day (Odisha, India)
  - Start of Testicular Cancer Awareness week (United States), April 1–7
  - Season for Nonviolence January 30 – April 4
- April 2
  - International Children's Book Day (International observance)
  - Malvinas Day (Argentina)
  - National Peanut Butter and Jelly Day (United States)
  - Thai Heritage Conservation Day (Thailand)
  - Unity of Peoples of Russia and Belarus Day (Belarus)
  - World Autism Awareness Day (International observance)
- April 3
- April 4
  - Children's Day (Hong Kong, Taiwan)
  - Independence Day (Senegal)
  - International Day for Mine Awareness and Assistance in Mine Action
  - Peace Day (Angola)
- April 5
  - Children's Day (Palestinian territories)
  - National Caramel Day (United States)
  - Sikmogil (South Korea)
- April 6
  - International Asexuality Day
  - Chakri Day (Thailand)
  - National Beer Day (United Kingdom)
  - New Beer's Eve (United States)
  - Tartan Day (United States & Canada)
- April 7
  - Flag Day (Slovenia)
  - Genocide Memorial Day (Rwanda), and its related observance:
    - International Day of Reflection on the 1994 Rwanda Genocide (United Nations)
  - Motherhood and Beauty Day (Armenia)
  - National Beer Day (United States)
  - Sheikh Abeid Amani Karume Day (Tanzania)
  - Women's Day (Mozambique)
  - World Health Day (International observance)
- April 8
  - Buddha's Birthday (Japan only, other countries follow different calendars)
  - Feast of the First Day of the Writing of the Book of the Law (Thelema)
  - International Romani Day (International observance)
- April 9
  - Anniversary of the German Invasion of Denmark (Denmark)
  - Baghdad Liberation Day (Iraqi Kurdistan)
  - Constitution Day (Kosovo)
  - Day of National Unity (Georgia)
  - Day of the Finnish Language (Finland)
  - Day of Valor or Araw ng Kagitingan (Philippines)
  - Feast of the Second Day of the Writing of the Book of the Law (Thelema)
  - International Banshtai Tsai Day
  - Martyr's Day (Tunisia)
  - National Former Prisoner of War Recognition Day (United States)
  - Remembrance for Haakon Sigurdsson (The Troth)
  - Vimy Ridge Day (Canada)
- April 10
  - Day of the Builder (Azerbaijan)
  - Feast of the Third Day of the Writing of the Book of the Law (Thelema)
  - Siblings Day (International observance)
- April 11
  - Juan Santamaría Day, anniversary of his death in the Second Battle of Rivas. (Costa Rica)
  - International Louie Louie Day
  - National Cheese Fondue Day (United States)
  - World Parkinson's Day
- April 12
  - Children's Day (Bolivia and Haiti)
  - Commemoration of first human in space by Yuri Gagarin:
    - Cosmonautics Day (Russia)
    - International Day of Human Space Flight
    - Yuri's Night (International observance)
  - Halifax Day (North Carolina)
  - National Grilled Cheese Sandwich Day (United States)
  - National Redemption Day (Liberia)
- April 13
  - Jefferson's Birthday (United States)
  - Katyn Memorial Day (Poland)
  - Teachers' Day (Ecuador)
  - First day of Thingyan (Myanmar) (April 13–16)
  - Unfairly Prosecuted Persons Day (Slovakia)
- April 14
  - ʔabusibaree (Okinawa Islands, Japan)
  - Ambedkar Jayanti (India)
  - Black Day (South Korea)
  - Commemoration of Anfal Genocide Against the Kurds (Iraqi Kurdistan)
  - Dhivehi Language Day (Maldives)
  - Day of Mologa (Yaroslavl Oblast, Russia)
  - Day of the Georgian language (Georgia (country))
  - Season of Emancipation (April 14 to August 23) (Barbados)
  - N'Ko Alphabet Day (Mande speakers)
  - Pohela Boishakh (Bangladesh)
  - Pana Sankranti (Odisha, India)
  - Puthandu (Tamils) (India, Malaysia, Singapore, Sri Lanka)
  - Second day of Songkran (Thailand)
  - Pan American Day (several countries in the Americas)
  - The first day of Takayama Spring Festival (Takayama, Gifu, Japan)
  - Vaisakh (Punjab), (India and Pakistan)
  - Youth Day (Angola)
- April 15
  - Day of the Sun (North Korea).
  - Hillsborough Disaster Memorial (Liverpool, England)
  - Jackie Robinson Day (United States)
  - Pohela Boishakh (West Bengal, India) (Note: celebrated on April 14 in Bangladesh)
  - Last day of Songkran (Thailand)
  - Tax Day, the official deadline for filing an individual tax return (or requesting an extension). (United States, Philippines)
  - Universal Day of Culture
  - World Art Day
- April 16
  - Birthday of José de Diego (Puerto Rico, United States)
  - Birthday of Queen Margrethe II (Denmark)
  - Emancipation Day (Washington, D.C., United States)
  - Foursquare Day (International observance)
  - Memorial Day for the Victims of the Holocaust (Hungary)
  - National Healthcare Decisions Day (United States)
  - Remembrance of Chemical Attack on Balisan and Sheikh Wasan (Iraqi Kurdistan)
  - World Voice Day
- April 17
  - Evacuation Day (Syria)
  - FAO Day (Iraq)
  - Flag Day (American Samoa)
  - Malbec World Day
  - National Cheeseball Day (United States)
  - National Espresso Day (Italy)
  - Women's Day (Gabon)
  - World Hemophilia Day
- April 18
  - Anniversary of the Victory over the Teutonic Knights in the Battle of the Ice, 1242 (Russia)
  - Army Day (Iran)
  - Coma Patients' Day (Poland)
  - Friend's Day (Brazil)
  - Independence Day (Zimbabwe)
  - International Day For Monuments and Sites
  - Invention Day (Japan)
- April 19
  - Army Day (Brazil)
  - Beginning of the Independence Movement (Venezuela)
  - Bicycle Day
  - Dutch-American Friendship Day (United States)
  - Holocaust Remembrance Day (Poland)
  - Indigenous Peoples Day (Brazil)
  - King Mswati III's birthday (Eswatini)
  - Landing of the 33 Patriots Day (Uruguay)
  - National Garlic Day (United States)
  - National Rice Ball Day (United States)
  - Primrose Day (United Kingdom)
- April 20
  - 420 (cannabis culture) (International)
  - UN Chinese Language Day (United Nations)
  - Evacuee Flag Day (Finland)
- April 21
  - Natale di Roma(Italy)
  - A&M Day (Texas A&M University)
  - Civil Service Day (India)
  - Grounation Day (Rastafari movement)
  - Heroic Defense of Veracruz (Mexico)
  - Kang Pan-sok's Birthday (North Korea)
  - Kartini Day (Indonesia)
  - Local Self Government Day (Russia)
  - National Tree Planting Day (Kenya)
  - San Jacinto Day (Texas)
  - Queen's Official Birthday (Falkland Islands)
  - Tiradentes' Day (Brazil)
  - Vietnam Book Day (Vietnam)
- April 22
  - Discovery Day (Brazil)
  - Earth Day (International observance) and its related observance:
    - International Mother Earth Day
  - Holocaust Remembrance Day (Serbia)
  - National Jelly Bean Day (United States)
- April 23
  - Castile and León Day (Castile and León, Spain)
  - German Beer Day (Germany)
  - Independence Day (Conch Republic, Key West, Florida)
  - International Pixel-Stained Technopeasant Day
  - Khongjom Day (Manipur, India)
  - National Sovereignty and Children's Day (Turkey and Northern Cyprus)
  - Navy Day (China)
  - St George's Day (England) and its related observances:
    - Canada Book Day (Canada)
    - La Diada de Sant Jordi (Catalonia, Spain)
    - World Book Day
  - UN English Language Day (United Nations)
- April 24
  - Armenian Genocide Remembrance Day (Armenia)
  - Concord Day (Niger)
  - Children's Day (Zambia)
  - Democracy Day (Nepal)
  - Fashion Revolution Day
  - Flag Day (Ireland)
  - International Sculpture Day
  - Kapyong Day (Australia)
  - Labour Safety Day (Bangladesh)
  - National Panchayati Raj Day (India)
  - National Pigs in a Blanket Day (United States)
  - Republic Day (The Gambia)
  - St Mark's Eve (Western Christianity)
  - World Day for Laboratory Animals
- April 25
  - Anniversary of the First Cabinet of Kurdish Government (Iraqi Kurdistan)
  - Anzac Day (Australia, New Zealand)
  - Arbor Day (Germany)
  - DNA Day
  - Feast of Saint Mark (Western Christianity)
  - Flag Day (Faroe Islands)
  - Flag Day (Eswatini)
  - Freedom Day (Portugal)
  - Liberation Day (Italy)
  - Major Rogation (Western Christianity)
  - Military Foundation Day (North Korea)
  - National Zucchini Bread Day (United States)
  - Parental Alienation Awareness Day
  - Red Hat Society Day
  - Sinai Liberation Day (Egypt)
  - World Malaria Day
- April 26
  - Chernobyl disaster related observances:
    - Memorial Day of Radiation Accidents and Catastrophes (Russia)
    - Day of Remembrance of the Chernobyl tragedy (Belarus)
  - Confederate Memorial Day (Florida, United States)
  - Hug A Friend Day
  - Lesbian Visibility Day
  - National Pretzel Day (United States)
  - Old Permic Alphabet Day
  - Union Day (Tanzania)
  - World Intellectual Property Day
  - TV Globo officially aired (Brazil, 1965 AD)
- April 27
  - Day of Russian Parliamentarism (Russia)
  - Day of the Uprising Against the Occupying Forces (Slovenia)
  - Flag Day (Moldova)
  - Freedom Day (South Africa)
    - UnFreedom Day
  - Independence Day (Sierra Leone)
  - Independence Day (Togo)
  - National Day (Mayotte)
  - National Day (Sierra Leone)
  - National Prime Rib Day (United States)
  - National Veterans' Day (Finland)
- April 28
  - Lawyers' Day (Orissa, India)
  - Mujahideen Victory Day (Afghanistan)
  - National Day (Sardinia, Italy)
  - National Heroes Day (Barbados)
  - Restoration of Sovereignty Day (Japan)
  - Workers' Memorial Day and World Day for Safety and Health at Work (international)
    - National Day of Mourning (Canada)
- April 29
  - Day of Remembrance for all Victims of Chemical Warfare (United Nations)
  - International Dance Day (UNESCO)
  - Princess Bedike's Birthday (Denmark)
  - National Shrimp Scampi Day (United States)
  - Shōwa Day, traditionally the start of the Golden Week holiday period, which is April 29 and May 3–5. (Japan)
- April 30
  - Armed Forces Day (Georgia (country))
  - Birthday of the King (Sweden)
  - Camarón Day (French Foreign Legion)
  - Children's Day (Mexico)
  - Consumer Protection Day (Thailand)
  - Honesty Day (United States)
  - International Jazz Day (UNESCO)
  - Martyrs' Day (Pakistan)
  - May Eve, the eve of the first day of summer in the Northern hemisphere (see May 1):
    - Beltane begins at sunset in the Northern hemisphere, Samhain begins at sunset in the Southern hemisphere. (Neo-Druidic Wheel of the Year)
    - Carodejnice (Czech Republic and Slovakia)
    - Walpurgis Night (Central and Northern Europe)
  - National Persian Gulf Day (Iran)
  - Reunification Day (Vietnam)
  - Russian State Fire Service Day (Russia)
  - Tax Day (Canada)
  - Teachers' Day (Paraguay)

== See also ==
- Germanic calendar
- List of historical anniversaries
- Sinking of the RMS Titanic
