= April 23 =

April 23 this year in various calendars
- Thursday, 23 April 2026
Akan	Foyaw
Armenian	7 Mareri 1475
Aztec	Xocotlhuetzi 3, 13 Ozomahtli
Babylonian	5 Nisanu, 2337 SE
Balinese pawukon	Menga, Pasah, Jaya, Keliwon, Tungleh, Wraspati of Ukir, Guru, Urungan, Manusa
Bengali	10 Boisakh, BS 1433
Chinese	Yin Fire Rabbit・Well Mansion; Fire Horse Year, Month 3, Day 7 (Guyu, 12 days until Lixia)
Common Era	23 April 2026 CE
Coptic	15 Parmouti, AM 1742
Egyptian	7 Thoth, 2775 NE
Ethiopian	15 Miyāzyā, 2018 Amätä Məhrät
French Republican	Décade I, Quartidi de Floréal de l'Année 234 de la République
Gregorian	23 April, AD 2026
Hebrew	6 Iyar, AM 5786; Omer 21
Hindu	Punarvasu・Sukarman; Solar: 10 Vaiśākha, 1948 SE; Lunisolar: Saptamī, Śukla pakṣa of Vaiśākha, 2083 VE; Rāudra・5127 KY・1,872,688
Icelandic	Fimmtudagur, 1 Harpa 2026
Islamic	6 Dhu al-Qi'dah, AH 1447 (using tabular method)
ISO week date	2026-W17-4
Japanese	7 Yayoi, Reiwa 8 (Kokuu, 12 days until Rikka)
Julian	10 April, AD 2026 (AM 7534)
Julian day	2461154
Korean	7 Yongdal, 4359 DE
Maya	13.0.13.9.11; 4 Uo, 13 Chuen
Roman	ante diem IV Idus Apriles, MMDCCLXXIX AUC
Solar Hijri	3 Ordibehesht, SH 1405
Tibetan	7 nag pa, me pho rta 2153 or 1772 or 1000

<<	April					>>
Su	Mo	Tu	We	Th	Fr	Sa
			1	2	3	4
5	6	7	8	9	10	11
12	13	14	15	16	17	18
19	20	21	22	23	24	25
26	27	28	29	30
2026

April 23 in recent years
2026 (Thursday)
2025 (Wednesday)
2024 (Tuesday)
2023 (Sunday)
2022 (Saturday)
2021 (Friday)
2020 (Thursday)
2019 (Tuesday)
2018 (Monday)
2017 (Sunday)

April 23 is the 113th day of the year (114th in leap years) in the Gregorian calendar; 252 days remain until the end of the year.

== Events ==
=== Pre-1600 ===
- 215 BC – A temple is built on the Capitoline Hill dedicated to Venus Erycina to commemorate the Roman defeat at Lake Trasimene.
- 599 – Maya king Uneh Chan of Calakmul attacks rival city-state Palenque in southern Mexico, defeating queen Yohl Ik'nal and sacking the city.
- 711 – Dagobert III succeeds his father King Childebert III as King of the Franks.
- 1014 – Battle of Clontarf: High King of Ireland Brian Boru defeats Viking invaders, but is killed in battle.
- 1016 – Edmund Ironside succeeds his father Æthelred the Unready as King of England.
- 1343 – St. George's Night Uprising commences in the Duchy of Estonia.
- 1348 – The founding of the Order of the Garter by King Edward III is announced on St. George's Day.
- 1500 – Portuguese explorer Pedro Alvarez Cabral reaches new coastline (Brazil).
- 1516 – The Munich Reinheitsgebot (regarding the ingredients of beer) takes effect in all of Bavaria.
- 1521 – Battle of Villalar: King Charles I of Spain defeats the Comuneros.

=== 1601–1900 ===
- 1635 – The first public school in the United States, the Boston Latin School, is founded.
- 1655 – The Siege of Santo Domingo begins during the Anglo-Spanish War, and fails seven days later.
- 1660 – Treaty of Oliva is established between Sweden and Poland.
- 1661 – King Charles II of England, Scotland and Ireland is crowned in Westminster Abbey.
- 1724 – Johann Sebastian Bach leads the first performance of his cantata Du Hirte Israel, höre, BWV 104, illustrating the topic of the Good Shepherd in pastoral music.
- 1815 – The Second Serbian Uprising: A second phase of the national revolution of the Serbs against the Ottoman Empire, erupts shortly after the annexation of the country to the Ottoman Empire.
- 1879 – Fire burns down the second main building and dome of the University of Notre Dame, which prompts the construction of the third, and current, Main Building with its golden dome.
- 1891 – Chilean Civil War: The ironclad Blanco Encalada is sunk at Caldera Bay by torpedo boats.

=== 1901–present ===
- 1909 – In Portugal, a magnitude 6.0 earthquake strikes near Lisbon, killing at least 60 people and injuring 75.
- 1918 – World War I: The British Royal Navy makes a raid in an attempt to neutralise the Belgian port of Bruges-Zeebrugge.
- 1919 – The Estonian Constituent Assembly is held in Estonia, which marks the birth of the Estonian Parliament, the Riigikogu.
- 1920 – The Grand National Assembly of Turkey (TBMM) is founded in Ankara. The assembly denounces the government of Sultan Mehmed VI and announces the preparation of a temporary constitution.
- 1927 – Cardiff City defeat Arsenal in the FA Cup Final, the only time it has been won by a team not based in England.
- 1935 – The Polish Constitution of 1935 is adopted.
- 1940 – The Rhythm Club fire at a dance hall in Natchez, Mississippi, kills 198 people.
- 1941 – World War II: The Greek government and King George II evacuate Athens before the invading Wehrmacht.
- 1942 – World War II: Baedeker Blitz: German bombers hit Exeter, Bath and York in retaliation for the British raid on Lübeck.
- 1945 – World War II: Adolf Hitler's designated successor, Hermann Göring, sends him a telegram asking permission to take leadership of Nazi Germany. Martin Bormann and Joseph Goebbels advise Göring that the telegram is treasonous.
- 1946 – Manuel Roxas is elected the last President of the Commonwealth of the Philippines.
- 1949 – Chinese Civil War: Establishment of the People's Liberation Army Navy.
- 1951 – Cold War: American journalist William N. Oatis is arrested for espionage by the Communist government of Czechoslovakia.
- 1961 – During the Algiers putsch by French generals, President Charles de Gaulle announces he has assumed emergency powers, and calls on troops and civilians to support him.
- 1966 – Aeroflot Flight 2723 crashes into the Caspian Sea off the Absheron Peninsula, killing 33 people.
- 1967 – Soviet space program: Soyuz 1 (Russian: Союз 1, Union 1), a crewed spaceflight carrying cosmonaut Colonel Vladimir Komarov, is launched into orbit.
- 1968 – Vietnam War: Student protesters at Columbia University in New York City take over administration buildings and shut down the university.
- 1971 – Bangladesh Liberation War: The Pakistan Army and Razakars massacre approximately 3,000 Hindu emigrants in the Jathibhanga area of East Pakistan (now Bangladesh).
- 1979 – SAETA Flight 011 crashes in Pastaza Province, Ecuador, killing all 57 people on board. The wreckage was not discovered until 1984.
- 1979 – Blair Peach, a British activist, is fatally injured after being knocked unconscious during an Anti-Nazi League demonstration against a National Front election meeting in Southall, London.
- 1985 – Coca-Cola changes its formula and releases New Coke. The response is overwhelmingly negative, and the original formula is back on the market in less than three months.
- 1990 – Namibia becomes the 160th member of the United Nations and the 50th member of the Commonwealth of Nations.
- 1993 – Eritreans vote overwhelmingly for independence from Ethiopia in a United Nations-monitored referendum.
- 1993 – Sri Lankan politician Lalith Athulathmudali is assassinated while addressing a gathering, approximately four weeks ahead of the Provincial Council elections for the Western Province.
- 2005 – The first YouTube video, titled "Me at the zoo", is published by co-founder Jawed Karim.
- 2013 – At least 111 people are killed and 233 injured as violence breaks out in Hawija, Iraq.
- 2018 – A vehicle-ramming attack kills 11 people and injures 15 in Toronto. A 25-year-old suspect, Alek Minassian, is arrested.
- 2019 – The April 2019 Hpakant jade mine collapse in Myanmar kills four miners and two rescuers, with at least 50 others missing and presumed dead.
- 2024 – The 2024 Lumut mid-air collision in Malaysia kills 10 people while rehearsing for the 90th anniversary of the Royal Malaysian Navy.

== Births ==
=== Pre-1600 ===
- 1141 (probable) – Malcolm IV of Scotland (died 1165)
- 1185 – Afonso II of Portugal (died 1223)
- 1408 – John de Vere, 12th Earl of Oxford (died 1462)
- 1420 – George of Poděbrady, King of Bohemia (died 1471)
- 1464 – Joan of France, Duchess of Berry (died 1505)
- 1464 – Robert Fayrfax, English Renaissance composer (died 1521)
- 1484 – Julius Caesar Scaliger, Italian physician and scholar (died 1558)
- 1500 – Alexander Ales, Scottish theologian and academic (died 1565)
- 1500 – Johann Stumpf, Swiss writer (died 1576)
- 1512 – Henry FitzAlan, 19th Earl of Arundel, Chancellor of the University of Oxford (died 1580)
- 1516 – Georg Fabricius, German poet, historian, and archaeologist (died 1571)
- 1564 – William Shakespeare, English playwright and poet (died 1616)
- 1598 – Maarten Tromp, Dutch admiral (died 1653)

=== 1601–1900 ===
- 1621 – William Penn, English admiral and politician (died 1670)
- 1628 – Johannes Hudde, Dutch mathematician and politician (died 1704)
- 1661 – Issachar Berend Lehmann, German-Jewish banker, merchant and diplomat (died 1730)
- 1715 – Johann Friedrich Doles, German composer and conductor (died 1797)
- 1720 – Vilna Gaon, Lithuanian rabbi and author (died 1797)
- 1744 – Princess Charlotte Amalie Wilhelmine of Schleswig-Holstein-Sonderburg-Plön (died 1770)
- 1748 – Félix Vicq-d'Azyr, French physician and anatomist (died 1794)
- 1791 – James Buchanan, American soldier, lawyer, and politician, 15th President of the United States (died 1868)
- 1792 – Thomas Romney Robinson, Irish astronomer and physicist (died 1882)
- 1794 – Wei Yuan, Chinese scholar and author (died 1856)
- 1805 – Johann Karl Friedrich Rosenkranz, German philosopher and academic (died 1879)
- 1812 – Frederick Whitaker, English-New Zealand lawyer and politician, 5th Prime Minister of New Zealand (died 1891)
- 1813 – Stephen A. Douglas, American educator and politician, 7th Illinois Secretary of State (died 1861)
- 1813 – Frédéric Ozanam, Italian-French historian and scholar (died 1853)
- 1818 – James Anthony Froude, English historian, novelist, biographer and editor (died 1894)
- 1819 – Edward Stafford, Scottish-New Zealand educator and politician, 3rd Prime Minister of New Zealand (died 1901)
- 1853 – Winthrop M. Crane, American businessman and politician, 40th Governor of Massachusetts (died 1920)
- 1856 – Granville Woods, American inventor and engineer (died 1910)
- 1857 – Ruggero Leoncavallo, Italian composer (died 1919)
- 1858 – Max Planck, German physicist and academic, Nobel Prize laureate (died 1947)
- 1860 – Justinian Oxenham, Australian public servant (died 1932)
- 1861 – Edmund Allenby, 1st Viscount Allenby, English field marshal and diplomat, British High Commissioner in Egypt (died 1936)
- 1861 – John Peltz, American baseball player and manager (died 1906)
- 1865 – Ali-Agha Shikhlinski, Russian-Azerbaijani general (died 1943)
- 1867 – Johannes Fibiger, Danish physician and pathologist, Nobel Prize laureate (died 1928)
- 1876 – Arthur Moeller van den Bruck, German historian and author (died 1925)
- 1880 – Michel Fokine, Russian dancer and choreographer (died 1942)
- 1882 – Albert Coates, English composer and conductor (died 1953)
- 1888 – Georges Vanier, Canadian general and politician, 19th Governor General of Canada (died 1967)
- 1889 – Karel Doorman, Dutch admiral (died 1942)
- 1894 – Frank Borzage, American actor and director (died 1962)
- 1895 – Ngaio Marsh, New Zealand author and director (died 1982)
- 1897 – Folke Jansson, Swedish athlete (died 1965)
- 1897 – Lester B. Pearson, Canadian historian and politician, 14th Prime Minister of Canada, Nobel Peace Prize laureate (died 1972)
- 1898 – Lucius D. Clay, American general (died 1978)
- 1899 – Bertil Ohlin, Swedish economist and politician, Nobel Prize laureate (died 1979)
- 1899 – Minoru Shirota, Japanese physician and microbiologist, invented Yakult (died 1982)
- 1900 – Jim Bottomley, American baseball player and sportscaster (died 1959)
- 1900 – Joseph Green, Polish-American actor and director (died 1996)

=== 1901–present ===
- 1901 – E. B. Ford, English biologist and geneticist (died 1988)
- 1902 – Halldór Laxness, Icelandic author and poet, Nobel Prize laureate (died 1998)
- 1903 – Guy Simonds, English-Canadian general (died 1974)
- 1904 – Clifford Bricker, Canadian long-distance runner (died 1980)
- 1904 – Louis Muhlstock, Polish-Canadian painter (died 2001)
- 1904 – Duncan Renaldo, American actor (died 1985)
- 1907 – Lee Miller, American model and photographer (died 1977)
- 1907 – Fritz Wotruba, Austrian sculptor, designed the Wotruba Church (died 1975)
- 1908 – Myron Waldman, American animator and director (died 2006)
- 1910 – Sheila Scott Macintyre, Scottish mathematician (died 1960)
- 1910 – Simone Simon, French actress (died 2005)
- 1911 – Ronald Neame, English-American director, cinematographer, producer, and screenwriter (died 2010)
- 1913 – Diosa Costello, Puerto Rican-American entertainer, producer, and club owner (died 2013)
- 1915 – Arnold Alexander Hall, English engineer, academic, and businessman (died 2000)
- 1916 – Ivo Lola Ribar, Yugoslav communist politician, military leader, and People's Hero of Yugoslavia (died 1943)
- 1916 – Yiannis Moralis, Greek painter and educator (died 2009)
- 1916 – Sinah Estelle Kelley, American chemist (died 1982)
- 1917 – Dorian Leigh, American model (died 2008)
- 1917 – Tony Lupien, American baseball player and coach (died 2004)
- 1918 – Maurice Druon, French author and screenwriter (died 2009)
- 1919 – Oleg Penkovsky, Russian colonel (died 1963)
- 1920 – Eric Grant Yarrow, 3rd Baronet, English businessman (died 2018)
- 1921 – Judy Agnew, Second Lady of the United States (died 2012)
- 1921 – Cleto Bellucci, Italian archbishop (died 2013)
- 1921 – Janet Blair, American actress and singer (died 2007)
- 1921 – Warren Spahn, American baseball player and coach (died 2003)
- 1923 – Dolph Briscoe, American lieutenant and politician, 41st Governor of Texas (died 2010)
- 1923 – Avram Davidson, American soldier and author (died 1993)
- 1924 – Chuck Harmon, American baseball player and scout (died 2019)
- 1924 – Bobby Rosengarden, American drummer and bandleader (died 2007)
- 1926 – J.P. Donleavy, American-Irish novelist and playwright (died 2017)
- 1926 – Rifaat el-Mahgoub, Egyptian politician (died 1990)
- 1928 – Shirley Temple, American actress, singer, dancer, and diplomat (died 2014)
- 1929 – George Steiner, French-American philosopher, author, and critic (died 2020)
- 1932 – Halston, American fashion designer (died 1990)
- 1932 – Jim Fixx, American runner and author (died 1984)
- 1932 – Rafał Gan-Ganowicz, Polish mercenary, activist, and journalist (died 2002)
- 1933 – Annie Easley, American computer scientist, mathematician, and engineer (died 2011)
- 1934 – George Canseco, Filipino composer and producer (died 2004)
- 1936 – Roy Orbison, American singer-songwriter (died 1988)
- 1937 – Victoria Glendinning, English author and critic
- 1937 – David Mills, English cricketer (died 2013)
- 1937 – Barry Shepherd, Australian cricketer (died 2001)
- 1939 – Jorge Fons, Mexican director and screenwriter (died 2022)
- 1939 – Bill Hagerty, English journalist (died 2025)
- 1939 – Lee Majors, American actor
- 1939 – Ray Peterson, American pop singer (died 2005)
- 1940 – Michael Copps, American academic and politician
- 1940 – Dale Houston, American singer-songwriter (died 2007)
- 1940 – Michael Kadosh, Israeli footballer and manager (died 2014)
- 1941 – Jacqueline Boyer, French singer and actress
- 1941 – Arie den Hartog, Dutch road bicycle racer (died 2018)
- 1941 – Paavo Lipponen, Finnish journalist and politician, 38th Prime Minister of Finland
- 1941 – Michael Lynne, American film producer, co-founded New Line Cinema (died 2019)
- 1941 – Ed Stewart, English radio and television host (died 2016)
- 1941 – Ray Tomlinson, American computer programmer and engineer (died 2016)
- 1942 – Sandra Dee, American model and actress (died 2005)
- 1943 – Gail Goodrich, American basketball player and coach
- 1943 – Tony Esposito, Canadian-American ice hockey player, coach, and manager (died 2021)
- 1943 – Frans Koppelaar, Dutch painter
- 1943 – Hervé Villechaize, French actor (died 1993)
- 1944 – Jean-François Stévenin, French actor and director (died 2021)
- 1946 – Blair Brown, American actress
- 1946 – Carlton Sherwood, American soldier and journalist (died 2014)
- 1947 – Robert Burgess, English sociologist and academic (died 2022)
- 1947 – Glenn Cornick, English bass player (died 2014)
- 1947 – Bernadette Devlin McAliskey, Irish civil rights leader and politician
- 1948 – Pascal Quignard, French author and screenwriter
- 1948 – Serge Thériault, Canadian actor
- 1949 – Paul Collier, English economist and academic
- 1949 – David Cross, English violinist
- 1949 – John Miles, British rock singer, songwriter, and guitarist (died 2021)
- 1950 – Rowley Leigh, English chef and journalist
- 1950 – Barbara McIlvaine Smith, Sac and Fox Nation Native American politician
- 1951 – Martin Bayerle, American treasure hunter
- 1952 – Narada Michael Walden, American singer-songwriter, drummer, and producer
- 1953 – James Russo, American actor, director, producer, and screenwriter
- 1954 – Stephen Dalton, English air marshal
- 1954 – Michael Moore, American director, producer, and activist
- 1955 – Judy Davis, Australian actress
- 1955 – Tony Miles, English chess player (died 2001)
- 1955 – Urmas Ott, Estonian journalist and author (died 2008)
- 1955 – Serge Vohor, Vanuatuan politician, 4th Prime Minister of Vanuatu (died 2024)
- 1957 – Neville Brody, English graphic designer, typographer, and art director
- 1957 – Jan Hooks, American actress and comedian (died 2014)
- 1958 – Hilmar Örn Hilmarsson, Icelandic composer and producer
- 1958 – Ryan Walter, Canadian ice hockey player and coach
- 1959 – Unity Dow, Botswanan judge, author, and rights activist
- 1960 – Valerie Bertinelli, American actress
- 1960 – Steve Clark, English guitarist and songwriter (died 1991)
- 1960 – Barry Douglas, Irish pianist and conductor
- 1960 – Léo Jaime, Brazilian singer-songwriter, guitarist, and actor
- 1960 – Claude Julien, Canadian ice hockey player and coach
- 1961 – George Lopez, American comedian, actor, and talk show host
- 1961 – Pierluigi Martini, Italian race car driver
- 1962 – John Hannah, Scottish actor and producer
- 1962 – Shaun Spiers, English businessman and politician
- 1963 – Paul Belmondo, French race car driver
- 1963 – Robby Naish, American windsurfer
- 1964 – Gianandrea Noseda, Italian pianist and conductor
- 1965 – Leni Robredo, Filipina human rights lawyer, 14th Vice President of the Philippines
- 1966 – Jörg Deisinger, German bass player
- 1966 – Matt Freeman, American bass player
- 1966 – Lembit Oll, Estonian chess Grandmaster (died 1999)
- 1967 – Rhéal Cormier, Canadian baseball player (died 2021)
- 1967 – Melina Kanakaredes, American actress
- 1968 – Bas Haring, Dutch philosopher, writer, television presenter and professor.
- 1968 – Ken McRae, Canadian ice hockey player and coach
- 1968 – Timothy McVeigh, American terrorist, Oklahoma City bombing co-perpetrator (died 2001)
- 1969 – Martín López-Zubero, American-Spanish swimmer and coach
- 1969 – Yelena Shushunova, Russian gymnast (died 2018)
- 1970 – Egemen Bağış, Turkish politician, 1st Minister of European Union Affairs
- 1970 – Dennis Culp, American singer-songwriter and trombonist
- 1970 – Andrew Gee, Australian rugby league player and manager
- 1970 – Hans Välimäki, Finnish chef and author
- 1970 – Tayfur Havutçu, Turkish international footballer and manager
- 1971 – Uli Herzner, German-American fashion designer
- 1972 – Pierre Labrie, Canadian poet and playwright
- 1972 – Peter Dench, English photographer and journalist
- 1972 – Amira Medunjanin, Bosnian singer
- 1973 – Patrick Poulin, Canadian ice hockey player
- 1974 – Carlos Dengler, American bass player
- 1974 – Michael Kerr, New Zealand-German rugby player
- 1975 – Bobby Shaw, American football player
- 1976 – Gabriel Damon, American actor
- 1976 – Aaron Dessner, American guitarist, songwriter, and producer
- 1977 – John Cena, American professional wrestler and actor
- 1977 – Andruw Jones, Curaçaoan baseball player
- 1977 – David Kidwell, New Zealand rugby league player and coach
- 1977 – Willie Mitchell, Canadian ice hockey player
- 1977 – John Oliver, English comedian, actor, producer, and screenwriter
- 1977 – Kal Penn, Indian-American actor
- 1977 – Bram Schmitz, Dutch cyclist
- 1977 – Lee Young-pyo, South Korean international footballer
- 1978 – Gezahegne Abera, Ethiopian runner
- 1979 – Barry Hawkins, English snooker player
- 1979 – Jaime King, American actress and model
- 1979 – Joanna Krupa, Polish-American model and television personality
- 1979 – Samppa Lajunen, Finnish skier
- 1980 – Nicole den Dulk, Dutch Paralympic equestrian
- 1982 – Kyle Beckerman, American footballer
- 1982 – Tony Sunshine, American singer-songwriter
- 1983 – Leon Andreasen, Danish international footballer
- 1983 – Daniela Hantuchová, Slovak tennis player
- 1983 – Ian Henderson, English rugby league player
- 1984 – Alexandra Kosteniuk, Russian chess player
- 1984 – Moose, American professional wrestler and football player
- 1984 – Jesse Lee Soffer, American actor
- 1985 – Angel Locsin, Filipino actress, producer, and fashion designer
- 1986 – Sven Kramer, Dutch speed skater
- 1986 – Alysia Montaño, American runner
- 1986 – Rafael Fernandes, Brazilian baseball player
- 1987 – Michael Arroyo, Ecuadorian footballer
- 1987 – John Boye, Ghanaian footballer
- 1987 – Emily Fox, American basketball player
- 1988 – Victor Anichebe, Nigerian footballer
- 1988 – Sandra Borch, Norwegian politician
- 1988 – Alistair Brownlee, English triathlete
- 1988 – Patrick Maroon, American ice hockey player
- 1988 – Signe Ronka, Canadian figure skater
- 1988 – Lenka Wienerová, Slovak tennis player
- 1989 – Nicole Vaidišová, Czech tennis player
- 1990 – Rui Fonte, Portuguese footballer
- 1990 – Dev Patel, English actor
- 1991 – Britt Baker, American professional wrestler
- 1991 – Nathan Baker, English footballer
- 1991 – Caleb Johnson, American singer-songwriter
- 1991 – Kyle Juszczyk, American football player
- 1991 – Paul Vaughan, Australian-Italian rugby league player
- 1994 – Patrick Olsen, Danish footballer
- 1994 – Song Kang, South Korean actor
- 1995 – Gigi Hadid, American fashion model and television personality
- 1995 – Jamie Hayter, English professional wrestler
- 1996 – Carolina Alves, Brazilian tennis player
- 1997 – Zach Apple, American swimmer
- 1999 – Son Chaeyoung, South Korean rapper and singer-songwriter
- 1999 – Laufey, Icelandic singer-songwriter and musician
- 2000 – Chloe Kim, American snowboarder
- 2000 – Lee Jeno, South Korean rapper, vocalist and dancer
- 2018 – Prince Louis of Wales, British royal

== Deaths ==
=== Pre-1600 ===
- AD 303 – Saint George, Roman soldier and martyr
- 711 – Childebert III, Frankish king (born 670)
- 725 – Wihtred of Kent
- 871 – Æthelred of Wessex (born 837)
- 915 – Yang Shihou, Chinese general
- 944 – Wichmann the Elder, Saxon nobleman
- 990 – Ekkehard II, Swiss monk and abbot
- 997 – Adalbert of Prague, Czech bishop, missionary, and saint (born 956)
- 1014 – Brian Boru, Irish king (born 941)
- 1014 – Domnall mac Eimín, Mormaer of Mar
- 1016 – Æthelred the Unready, English son of Edgar the Peaceful (born 968)
- 1124 – Alexander I of Scotland (born 1078)
- 1151 – Adeliza of Louvain (born 1103)
- 1170 – Minamoto no Tametomo, Japanese samurai (born 1139)
- 1196 – Béla III of Hungary (born c. 1148)
- 1200 – Zhu Xi, Chinese philosopher (born 1130)
- 1217 – Inge II of Norway (born 1185)
- 1262 – Aegidius of Assisi, companion of Saint Francis of Assisi
- 1266 – Gilles of Saumur, French archbishop
- 1307 – Joan of Acre (born 1272)
- 1400 – Aubrey de Vere, 10th Earl of Oxford, English politician and nobleman (born c. 1338)
- 1407 – Olivier de Clisson, French soldier (born 1326)
- 1501 – Domenico della Rovere, Catholic cardinal (born 1442)
- 1554 – Gaspara Stampa, Italian poet (born 1523)

=== 1601–1900 ===
- 1605 – Boris Godunov, Russian ruler (born 1551)
- 1616 – William Shakespeare, English playwright and poet (born 1564)
- 1616 – Inca Garcilaso de la Vega, Spanish writer and historian (born 1539)
- 1620 – Hayyim ben Joseph Vital, Jewish scholar (born 1542)
- 1625 – Maurice, Prince of Orange (born 1567)
- 1695 – Henry Vaughan, Welsh poet and author (born 1621)
- 1702 – Margaret Fell, English religious leader, founded the Religious Society of Friends (born 1614)
- 1781 – James Abercrombie, Scottish general and politician (born 1706)
- 1784 – Solomon I of Imereti (born 1735)
- 1792 – Karl Friedrich Bahrdt, German theologian and author (born 1741)
- 1794 – Guillaume-Chrétien de Lamoignon de Malesherbes, French lawyer and politician (born 1721)
- 1827 – Georgios Karaiskakis, Greek general (born 1780)
- 1839 – Jacques Félix Emmanuel Hamelin, French admiral and explorer (born 1768)
- 1850 – William Wordsworth, English poet and author (born 1770)
- 1850 – John Joel Glanton, American outlaw, soldier, mercenary, and Texas ranger (born ~1819)
- 1865 – Silas Soule, American soldier and whistleblower of the Sand Creek Massacre (born 1838)
- 1889 – Jules Amédée Barbey d'Aurevilly, French author and critic (born 1808)
- 1895 – Carl Ludwig, German physician and physiologist (born 1815)

=== 1901–present ===
- 1905 – Gédéon Ouimet, Canadian politician, 2nd Premier of Quebec (born 1823)
- 1907 – Alferd Packer, American prospector and convicted cannibal (born 1842)
- 1915 – Rupert Brooke, English poet (born 1887)
- 1936 – Teresa de la Parra, French-Venezuelan author (born 1889)
- 1951 – Jules Berry, French actor and director (born 1883)
- 1951 – Charles G. Dawes, American banker and politician, 30th Vice President of the United States, Nobel Peace Prize laureate (born 1865)
- 1959 – Bak Jungyang, Korean politician (born 1872)
- 1965 – George Adamski, Polish-American ufologist and author (born 1891)
- 1966 – George Ohsawa, Japanese founder of the Macrobiotic diet (born 1893)
- 1981 – Josep Pla, Catalan journalist and author (born 1897)
- 1983 – Buster Crabbe, American swimmer and actor (born 1908)
- 1984 – Red Garland, American pianist (born 1923)
- 1985 – Sam Ervin, American lawyer and politician (born 1896)
- 1985 – Frank Farrell, Australian rugby league player and policeman (born 1916)
- 1986 – Harold Arlen, American composer (born 1905)
- 1986 – Jim Laker, English international cricketer and sportscaster; holder of world record for most wickets taken in a match (born 1922)
- 1986 – Otto Preminger, Ukrainian-American actor, director, and producer (born 1905)
- 1990 – Paulette Goddard, American actress (born 1910)
- 1991 – Johnny Thunders, American singer-songwriter and guitarist (born 1952)
- 1992 – Satyajit Ray, Indian director, producer, and screenwriter (born 1921)
- 1992 – Tanka Prasad Acharya, Nepalese politician, 27th Prime Minister of Nepal (born 1912)
- 1993 – Cesar Chavez, American activist, co-founded the United Farm Workers (born 1927)
- 1995 – Douglas Lloyd Campbell, Canadian farmer and politician, 13th Premier of Manitoba (born 1895)
- 1995 – Howard Cosell, American lawyer and journalist (born 1918)
- 1995 – Riho Lahi, Estonian journalist (born 1904)
- 1995 – John C. Stennis, American lawyer and politician (born 1904)
- 1996 – Jean Victor Allard, Canadian general (born 1913)
- 1996 – P. L. Travers, Australian-English author and actress (born 1899)
- 1997 – Denis Compton, English cricketer and footballer (born 1918)
- 1998 – Konstantinos Karamanlis, Greek lawyer and politician, 172nd Prime Minister of Greece (born 1907)
- 1998 – James Earl Ray, American assassin of Martin Luther King Jr. (born 1928)
- 1998 – Thanassis Skordalos, Greek singer-songwriter and lyra player (born 1920)
- 2003 – Fernand Fonssagrives, French-American photographer (born 1910)
- 2004 – Herman Veenstra, Dutch water polo player (born 1911)
- 2005 – Joh Bjelke-Petersen, New Zealand-Australian politician, 31st Premier of Queensland (born 1911)
- 2005 – Robert Farnon, Canadian-English trumpet player, composer and conductor (born 1917)
- 2005 – Al Grassby, Australian journalist and politician (born 1928)
- 2005 – John Mills, English actor (born 1908)
- 2005 – Romano Scarpa, Italian author and illustrator (born 1927)
- 2005 – Earl Wilson, American baseball player, coach and educator (born 1934)
- 2006 – Phil Walden, American record producer and manager, co-founder of Capricorn Records (born 1940)
- 2007 – Paul Erdman, Canadian-American economist and author (born 1932)
- 2007 – David Halberstam, American journalist, historian and author (born 1934)
- 2007 – Peter Randall, English sergeant (born 1930)
- 2007 – Boris Yeltsin, Russian politician, 1st President of Russia (born 1931)
- 2010 – Peter Porter, Australian-born British poet (born 1929)
- 2011 – James Casey, English comedian, radio scriptwriter and producer (born 1922)
- 2011 – Tom King, American guitarist and songwriter (born 1943)
- 2011 – Geoffrey Russell, 4th Baron Ampthill, English businessman and politician (born 1921)
- 2011 – Max van der Stoel, Dutch politician and Minister of State (born 1924)
- 2011 – John Sullivan, English screenwriter and producer (born 1946)
- 2012 – Lillemor Arvidsson, Swedish trade union leader and politician, 34th Governor of Gotland (born 1943)
- 2012 – Billy Bryans, Canadian drummer, songwriter and producer (born 1947)
- 2012 – Chris Ethridge, American bass player and songwriter (born 1947)
- 2012 – Raymond Thorsteinsson, Canadian geologist and paleontologist (born 1921)
- 2012 – LeRoy T. Walker, American football player and coach (born 1918)
- 2013 – Bob Brozman, American guitarist (born 1954)
- 2013 – Robert W. Edgar, American educator and politician (born 1943)
- 2013 – Tony Grealish, English footballer (born 1956)
- 2013 – Antonio Maccanico, Italian banker and politician (born 1924)
- 2013 – Frank W. J. Olver, English-American mathematician and academic (born 1924)
- 2013 – Kathryn Wasserman Davis, American philanthropist and scholar (born 1907)
- 2014 – Benjamín Brea, Spanish-Venezuelan saxophonist, clarinet player, and conductor (born 1946)
- 2014 – Michael Glawogger, Austrian director, screenwriter, and cinematographer (born 1959)
- 2014 – Jaap Havekotte, Dutch speed skater and producer of ice skates (born 1912)
- 2014 – Connie Marrero, Cuban baseball player and coach (born 1911)
- 2014 – F. Michael Rogers, American general (born 1921)
- 2014 – Mark Shand, English conservationist and author (born 1951)
- 2014 – Patric Standford, English composer and educator (born 1939)
- 2015 – Richard Corliss, American journalist and critic (born 1944)
- 2015 – Ray Jackson, Australian activist (born 1941)
- 2015 – Pierre Claude Nolin, Canadian lawyer and politician, Speaker of the Canadian Senate (born 1950)
- 2015 – Jim Steffen, American football player (born 1936)
- 2015 – Francis Tsai, American author and illustrator (born 1967)
- 2016 – Inge King, German-born Australian sculptor (born 1915)
- 2016 – Banharn Silpa-archa, Thai politician, Prime Minister from 1995 to 1996 (born 1932)
- 2019 – Charity Sunshine Tillemann-Dick, American soprano singer and presenter (born 1983)
- 2019 – Jean, Grand Duke of Luxembourg (born 1921)
- 2021 – Dan Kaminsky, American internet security researcher (born 1979)
- 2022 – Orrin Hatch, American politician, President pro tempore of the United States Senate (born 1934)
- 2024 – Frank Field, British politician (born 1942)
- 2024 – Helen Vendler, American Literary Critic (born 1933)
- 2026 - Łukasz Litewka, Polish Parliament Member (born 1989)

== Holidays and observances ==
- Christian feast day:
  - Adalbert of Prague
  - Felix, Fortunatus, and Achilleus
  - Saint George
  - Blessed Giles of Assisi
  - Gerard of Toul
  - Ibar of Beggerin (Meath)
  - Blessed Maria Gabriella Sagheddu
  - Toyohiko Kagawa (Episcopal and Lutheran Church)
  - Saint George's Day and its related observances:
    - Saint George's Day (Catalonia)
    - Saint George's Day (England)
  - Blessed Teresa Maria Manetti
  - April 23 (Eastern Orthodox liturgics)
- Canada Book Day (Canada)
- Castile and León Day (Castile and León)
- Khongjom Day (Manipur)
- National Sovereignty and Children's Day (Turkey and Northern Cyprus)
- Navy Day (China)
- World Book Day
- UN English Language Day (United Nations)
- UN Spanish Language Day (United Nations)

== Bibliography ==
- Hill, Alan (1998). Jim Laker: A Biography. London: Andre Deutsch Ltd. ISBN 978-02-33050-43-0.
