= Peter Randall =

Peter Randall may refer to:

- Peter Randall (British Army soldier) (1930–2007), British Army sergeant and recipient of the George Medal
- Peter Ralph Randall (1935–2024), anti-apartheid publisher and academic from South Africa
- William Peter Randall (born 1964), aka W. Peter Randall, musician and politician from Canada
- General Peter Randall, a fictional character in the video game Prototype
