= Edible (disambiguation) =

Edible items are those items that are safe for humans to eat.

Edible may also refer to:

- Cannabis edible, a food or drink product that contains cannabinoids
- Eating, the ingestion of food
- "Edibles" (JoJo song), a song on the JoJo album Mad Love
- "Edibles" (Snoop Dogg song), a song on the Snoop Dogg album Bush
- Foraging for wild foods related to survival skills
- Edible Book Festival, an annual event honoring the birthday of Jean Anthelme Brillat-Savarin
- Edible Arrangements, also known as Edible, US-based company selling arrangements of fruit
