= WVD =

WVD can mean

- World Vasectomy Day
- World Voice Day
- Wigner-Ville distribution, see Wigner quasiprobability distribution
