= Honesty =

Moral quality of truthfulness

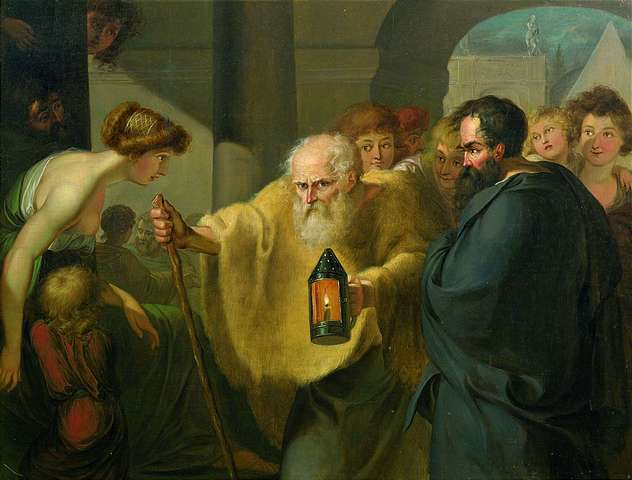
Diogenes Searching for an Honest Man, attributed to J. H. W. Tischbein (c. 1780)

Honesty or truthfulness is a facet of moral character that connotes positive and virtuous attributes such as integrity, truthfulness, straightforwardness (including straightforwardness of conduct: earnestness), along with the absence of lying, cheating, theft, etc. Honesty also involves being trustworthy, loyal, fair, and sincere.

A reputation for honesty is denoted by terms like reputability and trustworthiness. Honesty about one's future conduct, loyalties, or commitments is called accountability, reliability, dependability, or conscientiousness.

Someone who goes out of their way to tell possibly unwelcome truths extends honesty into the region of candor or frankness. The Cynics engaged in a challenging sort of frankness like this called parrhêsia.

== Opinions ==
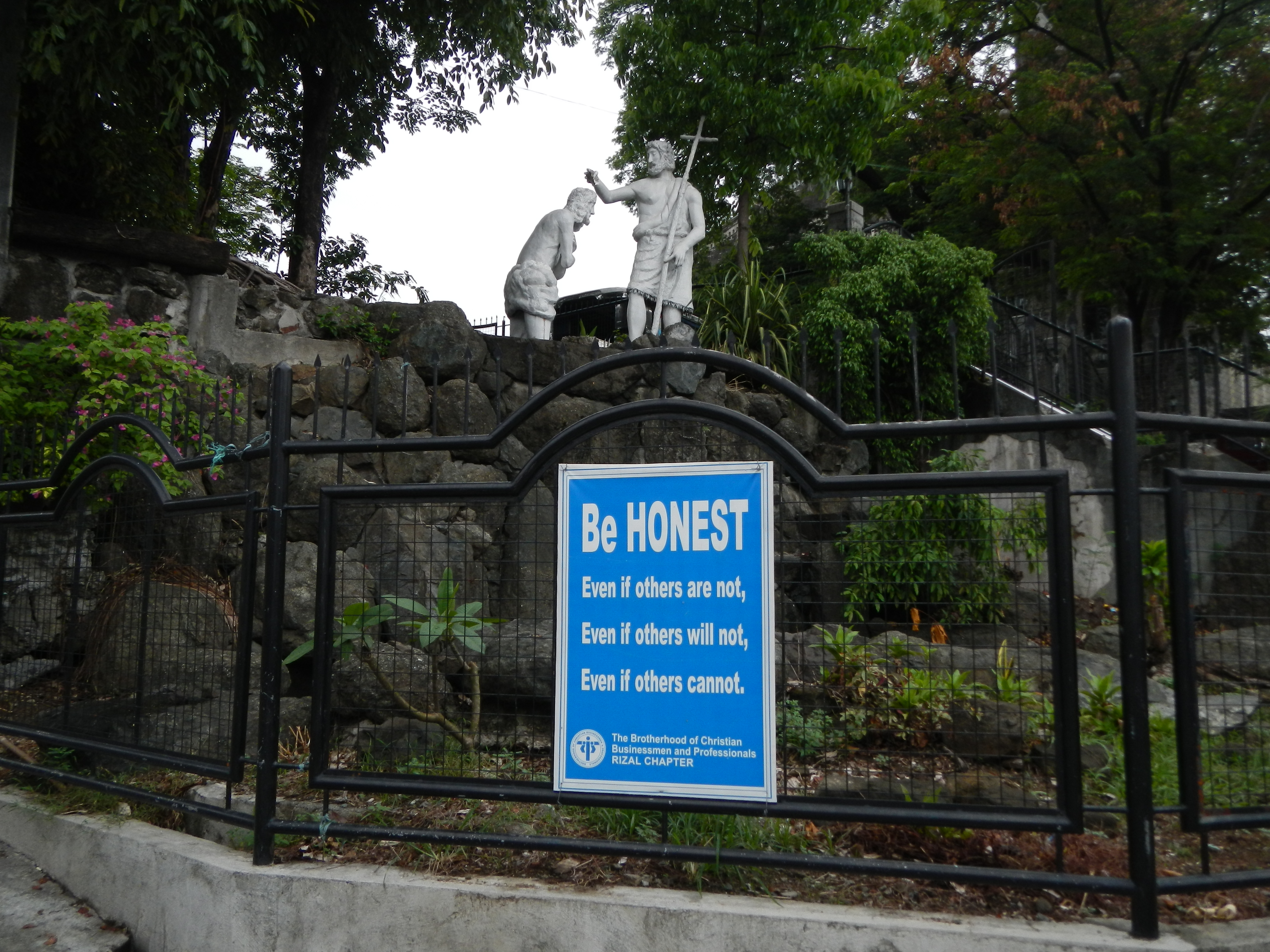
A sign in Taytay Church, Philippines, encouraging churchgoers to practice honesty

Honesty is valued in many ethnic and religious cultures. "Honesty is the best policy" is a proverb of Edwin Sandys, while the quote "Honesty is the first chapter in the book of wisdom" is attributed to Thomas Jefferson, as used in a letter to Nathaniel Macon. April 30 is national Honesty Day in the United States.

William Shakespeare described honesty as an attribute people leave behind when he wrote that "no legacy is so rich as honesty" in act 3, scene 5 of "All's Well that Ends Well."

Tolstoy thought that honesty was revolutionary: “No feats of heroism are needed to achieve the greatest and most important changes in the existence of humanity.... it is only needful that each individual should say what he really feels or thinks, or at least that he should not say what he does not think.” Aleksandr Solzhenitsyn ("Live Not By Lies," 1974) and Václav Havel (The Power of the Powerless, 1978) agreed. Havel wrote:

[L]iving within the truth has more than a mere existential dimension (returning humanity to its inherent nature), or a noetic dimension (revealing reality as it is), or a moral dimension (setting an example for others). It also has an unambiguous political dimension. If the main pillar of the system is living a lie, then it is not surprising that the fundamental threat to it is living the truth.

The 18th century enlightenment philosopher William Wollaston argued that all religion ultimately reduces to ethics and all ethics reduces to honesty (The Religion of Nature Delineated, 1722). “[E]very intelligent, active, and free being should so behave himself, as by no act to contradict truth; ...treat every thing as being what it is.” All else would follow from that.

Immanuel Kant made the duty of honesty a core example of his ethical theories.

Others noted, however, that "too much honesty might be seen as undisciplined openness". For example, individuals may be perceived as being "too honest" if they honestly express the negative opinions of others, either without having been asked their opinion, or having been asked in a circumstance where the response would be trivial. This concern manifests in political correctness, with individuals refraining from expressing their true opinions due to a general societal condemnation of such views. Research also found that honesty can lead to interpersonal harm because people avoid information about how their honest behavior affects others.

== Definitions ==
Merriam-Webster defines honesty as "fairness and straightforwardness of conduct" or "adherence to the facts".

The Oxford English Dictionary defines honesty as "the quality of being honest." Honest is, in turn, defined as "Free of deceit; truthful and sincere...Morally correct or virtuous...(attributive) Fairly earned, especially through hard work...(of an action) done with good intentions even if unsuccessful or misguided...(attributive) Simple, unpretentious, and unsophisticated.

== See also ==
- Authenticity (philosophy) – Concept in existential psychology and philosophy
- Good faith – Intention to be fair, open, and honest
- Integrity – Moral virtue and practice
- Lie – Intentionally false statement made to deceive
- Morality – Standard, doctrine or system of conduct
- Parrhesia – Rhetoric practice
- Radical honesty – Complete honesty devoid of any kind of deception
- Sincerity – Virtue of honest and genuine communication
- Spin (propaganda) – Form of propaganda in public relations and politics
- Trust – Assumption of and reliance on the honesty of another party
- Truth – Conformity to reality
