= Public holidays in Eswatini =

This is a list of holidays in Eswatini. If a holiday falls on a Sunday, it may be celebrated on the following Monday.

Date	Name	Comments
1 January	New Year's Day	
Late February to Early March	Lutsango Day	A public holiday in honour of the Lutsango regiment responsible for brewing the traditional alcoholic beverage known as buganu. Falls on the Monday following the ceremony at Hlane Royal Residence. It happens the Monday following each of the three legs of the Buganu Festival.
Friday before Easter; March or April	Good Friday	
Monday after Easter; March or April	Easter Monday	
19 April	King's Birthday	His Majesty Mswati III was born on 19 April 1968 in Manzini.
25 April	National Flag Day	
1 May	Workers' Day	
40 days after Easter; Thursday in May or June	Ascension Day	
Late August to Early September	Umhlanga (Reed Dance) Day	
6 September	Independence Day	Named for Ngwane IV, Somhlolo, who reigned from 1815 to 1836 and created a kingdom comparable to the Zulu, the Maroti, or the Pedi.
25 December	Christmas Day	
26 December	Boxing Day	
Late December to Early January	Incwala Day	This is the most important event in Eswatini culture. Its main purpose is to celebrate kingship.
