= National Volunteer Month =

Month in the United States

National Volunteer month in the United States takes place in the month of April. This month is dedicated to honoring all of the volunteers in our communities as well as encouraging volunteerism throughout the month.
