= International Day of Reflection on the 1994 Rwanda Genocide =

The International Day of Reflection on the 1994 Rwandan Genocide was recognized as an international observance by the United Nations on April 7, 2004. Commemorative events for the Rwandan genocide were held in several major cities including Kigali, Rwanda; New York City, United States; Dar-es-Salaam, Tanzania; and Geneva, Switzerland.

All member states of the UN were invited to join in one minute of silence in memory of the victims.

In a speech given at the Assembly Hall of the Palais des Nations, UN Secretary-General Kofi Annan called for actions to prevent future genocides.

== Key excerpts ==
- "It is good that we have observed those minutes of silence together. We must never forget our collective failure to protect at least eight hundred thousand defenceless (sic) men, women and children who perished in Rwanda ten years ago. Such crimes cannot be reversed. Such failures cannot be repaired. The dead cannot be brought back to life."
- In reference to the related lingering crisis in Sudan, "It is vital that international humanitarian workers and human rights experts be given full access to the region, and to the victims, without further delay. If that is denied, the international community must be prepared to take swift and appropriate action. By “action” in such situations I mean a continuum of steps, which may include military action. But the latter should always be seen as an extreme measure, to be used only in extreme cases... But let us not wait until the worst has happened, or is already happening."
