= International Sculpture Day =

International Sculpture Day, or IS Day, is a worldwide annual celebration of sculpture on the last Saturday of April every year. It was established by the International Sculpture Center and is meant to raise awareness, appreciation and enjoyment of sculpture in communities across the globe.

During the inaugural 2015 IS Day, over 50 events were held in 12 countries including Switzerland, China, Germany, England, Australia, Austria, Canada, Spain, New Zealand, and the USA. In its second year, over 200 events were held in 20+ countries including Australia, Denmark, Poland, Nigeria, Canada, France, Burkina Faso, Bolivia, Croatia and Mexico.

Types of IS Day events include open studios, demonstrations, workshops, public art tours, open museums, brown bag lunches, sculpture scavenger hunts, book signings, foundry pours, pop up exhibitions, opening receptions, competitions, artist talks, and more.

== See also ==
- International Sculpture Center
