= Head and Neck Cancer Alliance =

U.S. nonprofit organization

The Head and Neck Cancer Alliance (HNCA) is a non-profit organization that works with health professionals and organizations, celebrities and survivors to enhance the overall effort in prevention, treatment, and detection of cancers of the head and neck region.

The Head and Neck Cancer Alliance was established in 2008. Formerly the Yul Brynner Head and Neck Cancer Foundation, HNCA activities include: • Providing support to head and neck cancer patients throughout the year • Supporting ongoing research in head and neck oncology • Educating children and adults in the disease process, treatment and prevention of head and neck cancer

In addition to year-round events and awareness efforts such as benefit concerts and walkathons, the Alliance sponsors a week-long series of events to promote early detection and public awareness of this disease.

== Head and neck cancer ==
Cancers of the mouth (lip and tongue), larynx (voice box), pharynx (throat), salivary glands, and nose/nasal passages are generally known as head and neck cancer. These cancers typically form in the squamous cells, which are the cells lining the moistened, mucosal locations of the head and neck, such as the nose, mouth and throat. Such squamous cell cancers are usually termed, squamous cell carcinoma of the head and neck or head and neck squamous-cell carcinoma (HNSCC). HNSCC typically occurs among middle-aged to elderly adults, but increased diagnoses of HNSCC in people under the age of 45 has been reported in recent years.

== Oral, Head and Neck Cancer Awareness Week ==
Annual Oral Head and Neck Cancer Awareness Week is in April and the date moves yearly. For one week during April, chapters of The Head and Neck Cancer Alliance and affiliates conduct free screenings, educational school talks, walkathons, fundraisers and other events in an effort to save lives via early detection, awareness, support, and education. Chapters all across the country participate in awareness events to help increase knowledge of head and neck cancer; one such chapter is the Louisiana Chapter, which has the main focus of conducting research to raise funding for treatment of local head and neck cancer patients.

=== Screening ===
The stage of the disease is a determining factor in deciding the prognosis of head and neck cancer. There is a correlation between disease stage, survival and quality of life. The median five-year survival drops significantly from about 80% with the presence of regional or distant metastasis.

Nearly 8000 people die every year due to head and neck cancer, which is attributed to advanced stage disease at the time of diagnosis. Early detection is imperative for increasing chances of survival. Free screening clinics for head and neck cancers during Oral, Head and Neck Cancer Awareness week, sponsored by the Head and Neck Cancer Alliance, provides opportunities for earlier diagnosis of malignant cancer.

Screenings for oral, head and neck cancer are generally available via local physicians, dentists and other healthcare facilities. The Head and Neck Cancer Alliance offers free screenings nationwide; free screenings are offered predominantly during Oral, Head and Neck Cancer Awareness Week in April at healthcare events and other related functions. The Head and Neck Cancer Alliance has also developed Head and Neck Check, a free iPad app to assist people with screening themselves for head and neck cancer.
