= Día de la Chupina =

The Día de la Chupina (Spanish, literally Hooky Day) is a popular event and self-styled "holiday" created by secondary school students in the city of Rosario, Argentina. It is held annually, on the last Friday of every April. On this day, the students (with or without knowledge and/or consent of their parents) do not attend their classes, but gather instead in some particular spots of the city center, especially the National Flag Memorial and the highly commercial pedestrian-only section of Córdoba Street (Peatonal Córdoba).

== History ==
The first instance of the Día de la Chupina recorded in the press dates from 2001. On that occasion the event turned into a riot, in some cases fueled by alcohol consumption, since the first morning hours. Female students were harassed, and certain groups of students were attacked. The police intervened only later, detaining 13 students.

These incidents were repeated in 2002, on a larger scale. A large group or gang of students (between 100 and 200 according to witnesses) threw stones at windows, broke into shops to rob them, and attacked several people. The police detained 38 students.

Similar incidents took place again in 2003, with about 50 students attempting to steal merchandise from shops. The police acted quickly this time, and detained 10 offenders.

The celebrations in 2004 were considerably less problematic, though many shop owners chose to keep their doors temporarily closed. No incidents were reported in 2005 and 2006.
