= Rebuilding Together =

U.S. non-profit organization

- Formation: April 1973
- Founder: Patricia Riley Johnson
- Founded at: Midland, TX
- Headquarters: Washington, DC
- Location: United States
- President and CEO: Maureen Carlson
- Website: https://rebuildingtogether.org/

Rebuilding Together is an American non-profit organization with the goal of preserving affordable homeownership and revitalizing neighborhoods through free home repairs and modifications for neighbors in need.

Rebuilding Together has repaired more than 220,000 homes, nonprofit and community centers in the U.S. Rebuilding Together affiliate network consists of (114) offices throughout the United States, who act in partnership with and on behalf of the organization. The resources needed for repairs are obtained from grants, donations, sponsorships and gifts from businesses, schools and other kinds of organizations. These repairs make homes safer and more livable for families that cannot afford to pay maintenance costs.

Rebuilding Together has several targeted programs that address the needs of specific homeowner populations: veterans, older adults, people with disabilities and survivors of natural disasters. The work of Rebuilding Together impacts the condition of the surrounding community as well, through community center rehabilitation, playground builds and partnerships with organizations focused on disaster recovery, energy efficiency, sustainable community gardens, volunteer engagement and homeowner education. Workforce training is also a newer focus of the organization.

== History ==
Rebuilding Together was founded as "Christmas in April" in Midland, Texas in April 1973 based on the concept of neighbors helping neighbors and the century old tradition of community barn raising. The program got its name when one of the early recipients likened the help of having “Christmas in April.” Patricia Riley Johnson founded the national office in Washington, D.C., in 1988 after founding and running Christmas in April in Washington, D.C., since 1983. The national office changed its name to Rebuilding Together in 2000. During her time as Executive Director of the Washington, D.C. affiliate, Johnson said to the New York Times, "They offered me a part-time job and told me it would probably take half a year to organize the next rehab project. They had repaired 18 houses their first year. The year I took over we completed 85."

The national office helped grow the affiliate network across the United States. The organization previously owned its own national headquarters building in the Dupont Circle neighborhood of Washington, D.C. Johnson, who was named a Washingtonian of the Year by Washingtonian magazine in 1995, retired from Rebuilding Together in 2006 and was named Canon Missioner of the Washington National Cathedral. Subsequently, Patty Johnson died unexpectedly at the age of 71 in 2017. A foundation was formed in her honor, the Saint & Streetfighter Foundation.

== Examples of programs ==
Building A Healthy Neighborhood

Through Building a Healthy Neighborhood, Rebuilding Together adopts a deeper and longer-term focus at the neighborhood level. Building a Healthy Neighborhood is a partnership between Rebuilding Together, residents and community stakeholders to revitalize neighborhoods with safe, healthy, affordable, homes and community spaces that are accessible for all. We make a multiyear commitment to a target neighborhood or area and coordinate with partner organizations to improve the health and safety of homes and strengthen community infrastructure through the revitalization of parks, schools, community centers and nonprofit facilities.

Disaster Readiness and Recovery

With natural and man-made disasters on the rise, Rebuilding Together helps neighbors in times of crisis to rebuild their homes and lives. Rebuilding Together’s Disaster Readiness and Recovery program offers disaster mitigation, preparedness, response and long-term recovery support to help families and communities affected by natural disasters to rebuild their homes and lives.

Safe At Home

Safe at Home provides home modifications for older adults and people with disabilities to improve accessibility, reduce falls, increase independence and facilitate aging-in-place. Safe at Home is designed to improve aging-in-place outcomes for low-income older adults through the modification of their home environment to meet their specific needs. Safe at Home serves veterans and their families through Veterans at Home. Veterans at Home provides home modifications and repairs to veterans and their families to improve safety and accessibility, increase independence and facilitate aging-in-place.

She Builds

Women-led and women-focused, She Builds provides critical repairs for women-headed households and women-focused community spaces to enable women to maintain safe and healthy homes, make a difference in their communities and build a supportive community network. Participants come to the builds with a myriad of experiences and skills to share and learn from each other.

== National Rebuilding Month ==
National Rebuilding Month takes place annually in April to bring local communities together in the hopes of assisting low-income earners in need of home repairs. National Rebuilding Day is celebrated on the last Saturday of April, and over the weekend, thousands of volunteers across the country join forces to give a house lift to families in need. Critical repairs or refurbishments are done by volunteers at no cost to family members.

== Impact ==
Rebuilding Together originally embarked on a multi-year, multi-phase outcome evaluation plan in 2019 to try and fully understand the impact of its work on the health, safety, well-being and financial status of the residents and communities served. A survey conducted by an external evaluator found the following:

The work of Rebuilding Together has been proven to improve:

- Community Connection
- Safety
- Physical Health
- Mental Health
- Economic Security
- Independence

A social return on investment study conducted by independent economists and commissioned by the organization found that for every dollar by Rebuilding Together and its affiliates in each home, there is a projected $2.84 in social value generated through improved health, safety, independence and cost savings.
