= List of festivals and events in Kamakura =

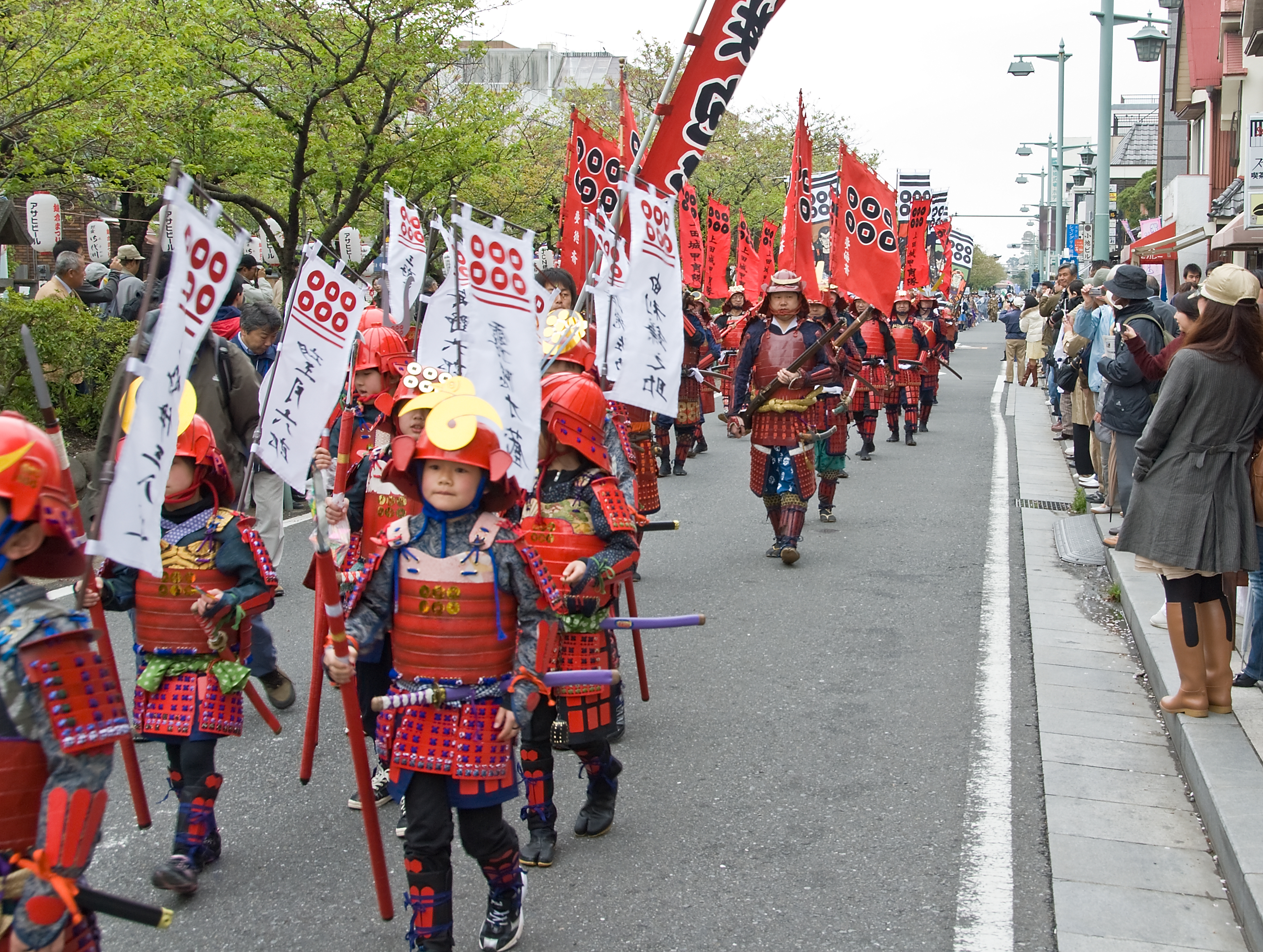
The Parade during the Kamakura Festival

The city of Kamakura in Kanagawa Prefecture has many festivals (matsuri (祭り)) and other events in all of the seasons, usually based on its rich historical heritage. They are often sponsored by private businesses and, unlike those in Kyoto, they are relatively small-scale events attended mostly by locals and a few tourists. January in particular has many because it's the first month of the year, so authorities, fishermen, businesses and artisans organize events to pray for their own health and safety, and for a good and prosperous working year. Kamakura's numerous temples and shrines, first among them city symbols Tsurugaoka Hachiman-gū and Kenchō-ji, organize many events too, bringing the total to over a hundred.

== January ==
1, 2 and 3 - Kamakura Ebisu (鎌倉えびす) at Hongaku-ji: Celebration of Ebisu, god of commerce. Young women dressed in traditional costumes (Fuku Musume) sell lucky charms made of bamboo and sake. Minamoto no Yoritomo made Ebisu the shogunate's tutelary god, but now people flock to the temple to wish for a good new year. There's a similar event on the tenth too, called Hon Ebisu (本えびす), and this time the girls distribute Fukumochi (rice cakes).

2nd - Funaoroshi (船おろし) at Sakanoshita: This event marks the beginning of the working year for local fishermen, who pray for big catches and the safety of their boats. Tangerines are thrown into the sea, boats carrying flags gather along the coast and the captain offers sake to Funadama (船霊), the boat's guardian kami.

4th - Funaiwai (船祝い) at Koshigoe: See Funaoroshi above.

4th - Chōna-hajimeshiki (手斧初式) at Tsurugaoka Hachiman: This event marks the beginning of the working year for local construction workers who, for the ceremony, use traditional working tools. The festival also commemorates Minamoto no Yoritomo, who ordered the reconstruction of the main building of the shrine after it was destroyed by fire in 1191. The ceremony takes place at 1:00 PM at Tsurugaoka Hachiman.

5th - Joma Shinji (除魔神事) at Tsurugaoka Hachiman: Festival to keep evil spirits away. Archers shoot at a target on which is painted the word "devil".

15th - Sagichō (左義長) at Tsurugaoka Hachiman: The paper decorations used during the New Year festivities are publicly burned.

== February ==
Day before the first day of spring (usually Feb. 3) - Setsubun Matsuri (節分祭) at Tsurugaoka Hachiman, Kenchō-ji, Hase-dera, Kamakura-gū, etc. : Celebration of the end of winter. Beans are scattered in the air to ensure good luck.

11th: Daikokutōe Seiman Matsuri (大国祷会成満祭り) at Chōshō-ji temple: Ceremony during which Buddhist monks douse themselves with cold water to pray for the country's safety.

== March ==
Last day of equinoctial week (end of the month): Dōbutsu Ireisai (動物慰霊祭) at Kōsoku-ji. The temple performs funerary rites in memory of defunct pets (dogs, cats, canaries).

== April ==
2nd to 3rd Sunday of April: Kamakura Matsuri at Tsurugaoka Hachiman and other locations: A whole week of events that celebrate the city and its history.

== May ==
5th - Kusajishi (草鹿) at the Kamakura-gū: Archers in samurai gear shoot arrows at a straw deer while reciting old poems.

== June ==
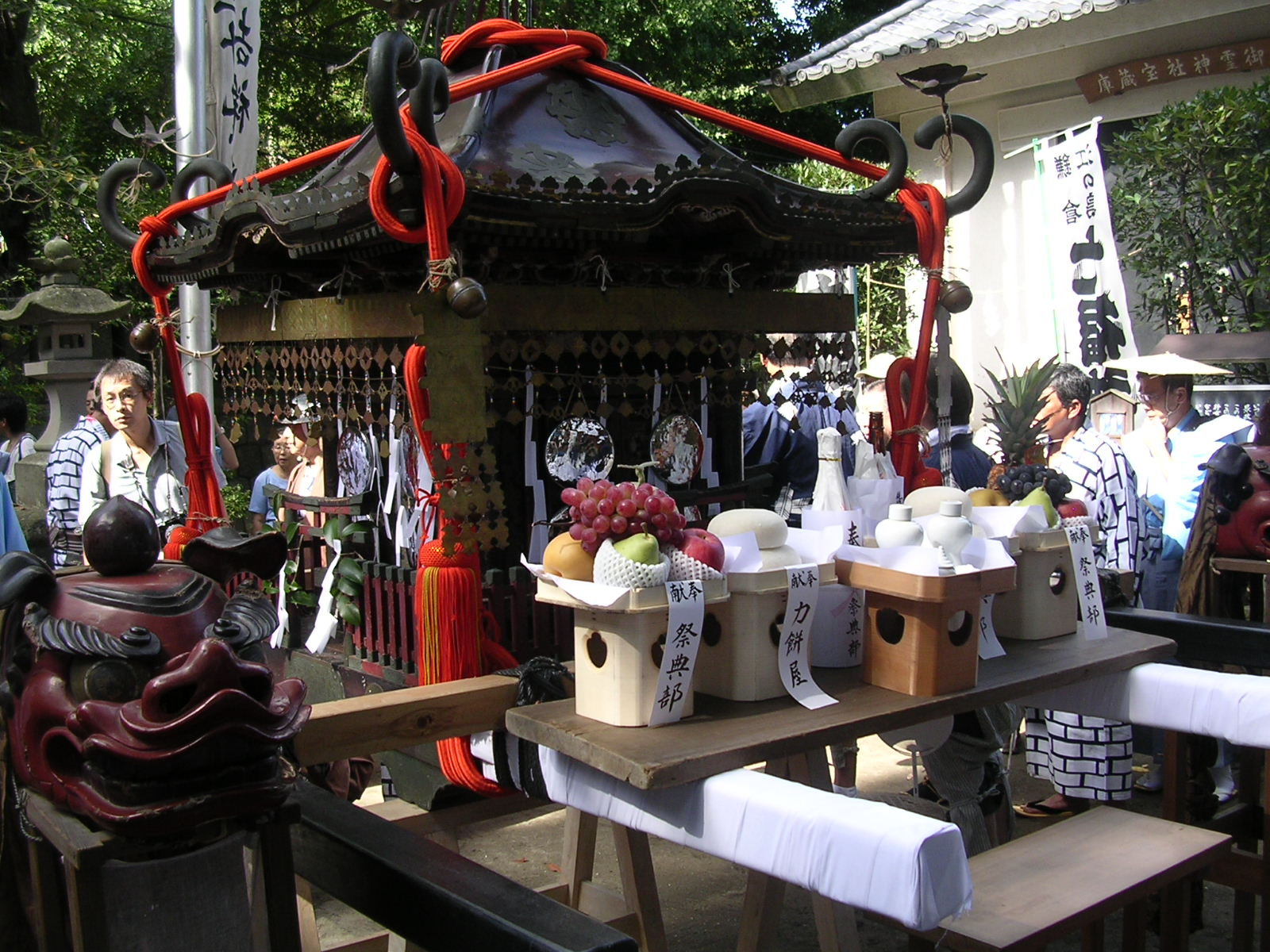
A mikoshi

2nd Sunday - Goshō Jinja Reisai (五所神社例祭) at Goshō Jinja: The faithful carry a portable shrine (a mikoshi) on Zaimokuza's streets. At about 3:00 PM the mikoshi is carried into the sea at Zaimokuza Beach.

== July ==
From the first to the second Sunday of the Month - Koyurugi Jinja Ten'osai (小動神社天王祭) at Koyurugi Jinja: Processions from Koshigoe's five neighborhoods play music and welcome the coming of the gods. Warrior dolls are displayed along the streets and, on the last day of the festival, Yasaka Jinja's mikoshi is carried from Enoshima to Koshigoe.

15th - Sanmon Kajiwara Segakie (三門梶原施餓鬼会) at Kenchō-ji: Funeral rites take place first early in the morning under the Sanmon gate. They are later repeated expressly for the soul of Kajiwara Kagetoki.

== August ==
From the first day of fall (usually the 8th) to the 9th - Bonbori Matsuri (ぼんぼり祭り) at Tsurugaoka Hachiman-gū: hand-drawn bonbori paper lanterns are submitted and exhibited on the shrine's grounds Photos of the lanterns.

10th (or following Monday if it falls on a Saturday): A full hour of fireworks on the beach in Yuigahama.

== September ==
14th, 15th and 16th - Tsurugaoka Hachiman-gū Reitaisai (鶴岡八幡宮例大祭): Famous festival with many attractions, the most famous of which is the Yabusame (流鏑馬), or Japanese horseback archery, which takes place on the 16th.

== October ==
October 8 and 9 - Kamakura Takigi-Nō (鎌倉薪能) at Kamakura Shrine: Noh plays are held at the shrine by the Kamakura Tourist Association. Tickets must be reserved in advance.

== November ==
Early November- 宝物風入 (Hōmotsu Kazeire): Treasure display at Kenchō-ji and Engaku-ji. Objects normally not visible by the public are on display for three days.

== December ==
16th- Gochinza Kinensai (御鎮座記念祭) at Tsurugaoka Hachiman-gū: Celebration of the founding of the shrine. After dark, bonfires are lighted and four maidens perform a ritual dance.
