= Buganu Festival =

Festival in Eswatini

The Buganu Festival is an annual three-day festival held in Eswatini in late February and early March, coinciding with the peak of the marula tree. A female festival, it also promotes the local brewing industry, which is entirely homemade and does not intend to sell it to outside markets.

== History ==
The Buganu Festival was first held on a small scale since the independence of Eswatini (at the time Swaziland), gradually growing in relevance and also featuring the participation of the Swazi Royal Family.

In it, women from all over Eswatini come, wearing traditional regalia, to brew buganu. The ritual begins with the buganu, fruits and vegetables being sent to the Queen Mother. They are also involved in dancing activities, using a dance reserved for women.

Although the festival happens around International Women's Day (8 March), given the fact that it is a female festival, its significance is merely coincidental, as female brewers were active locally long before the existence of the day.

The government halts all activities during each leg.

The first leg of the 2026 edition happened after a hail storm that hit the Buhleni Royal Residence, but did not cause large-scale damage as the women were already engaged in the event.

== Public holiday ==
In 2025, King Mswati III announced the creation of a public holiday held the Monday after the three-day Buganu Festival weekend, known as Lutsango Day.
