= Rafał Gan-Ganowicz =

Polish mercenary and journalist (1932–2002)

- Born: 23 April 1932; Warsaw, Poland
- Died: 22 November 2002 (aged 70); Lublin, Poland
- Resting place: Lublin, Cemetery of the church of St. Agnieszka
- Other name: Jerzy Rawicz
- Awards: Order of Polonia Restituta
- Military career
- Allegiance: United States; Polish government-in-exile
- Branch: United States Army
- Service years: 1950–1958
- Rank: Second Lieutenant
- Unit: The Polish Guard
- Mercenary career
- Allegiance: Congo-Léopoldville; Kingdom of Yemen
- Service years: Congo (1965–1966); Yemen (1967–1969)
- Conflicts: Congo Crisis; North Yemen Civil War

Rafał Gan-Ganowicz (23 April 1932 – 22 November 2002) was a Polish soldier-in-exile, mercenary, journalist, member of the National Council of Poland, and political and social activist, dedicating his life to anti-communism.

== Early life ==
Rafał Gan-Ganowicz was born in Wawer-Warsaw on 23 April 1932. His father served in the French Foreign Legion for a time, and later traveled to South America for business, investing in a rubber plantation in Brazil and gold mines in Argentina. His mother was killed in September 1939 during the opening days of the German Invasion of Poland. After this, his father moved him and his son from Wawer to the Warsaw district of Żoliborz. They lived here until the Warsaw Uprising took place in August 1944. Leaving to fight in the uprising, his father hid him in a cellar with other children and women, but was killed in the battle, leaving Rafał an orphan at twelve years old.

As an orphaned teenager in post-war Poland, Gan-Ganowicz first experienced the aftermath of the Soviet Red Army's occupation of Poland. Witnessing the Soviet troops abuse of Poles, their looting and their destruction of personal property led him to first develop his anti-communist beliefs. One event that particularly stuck with him was seeing one of his friends, an older boy who had been maimed while fighting in the Warsaw Uprising, thrown down a flight of stairs and called a "bandit" by a communist official.

Around 1948, he had joined an underground anti-communist group of youths who protested and campaigned against the newly established Polish Communist government and the Soviets. They would deface communist propaganda posters, spray anti-communist graffiti, and publish and distribute leaflets critical of the government. At one point, the group was able to steal guns from Police officers. In June 1950, the Polish Secret Police started to round up all suspected members of any anti-state groups and Rafał was tipped off by a friend that they were about to arrest him. Fearing being tortured into giving up other members of the group, he boarded a Soviet supply train, hiding in the undercarriage, that was headed for Berlin and escaped Poland.

=== Western Europe and 'The Polish Guard' ===
After arriving in Berlin, Gan-Ganowicz wandered around until he could find the western sector. He eventually turned himself over to the American authorities and he was granted political asylum due to his activities in Poland. Like many Polish refugees in the west, he joined the Polish Guard. This was a unit of the U.S. Army that was developed in cooperation with the Polish Government-in-exile for the purpose of guard, technical, and transport duties. He trained as a paratrooper and received the rank of Second Lieutenant, being given his beret by General Władysław Anders.

Displeased with being stationed in Germany, due to his dislike of Germany for the invasion of Poland, he applied to be stationed in France instead. He had hoped that the unit would act as a commando group used in a NATO invasion of Eastern Europe in the early days of the Cold War, being dropped behind enemy lines in Poland. He was disappointed that this never happened and he spent most of his time in the unit on guard and patrol duties. After his time in the Polish Guard, he found a job as a teacher in a school for Polish refugees in Paris.

== Mercenary activities ==
While living in Paris, Rafał was motivated by his status as a political refugee to use his time in the west not to build a new life for himself, but to fight against communism. In his book, Ganowicz describes job offers he received from Cuban authorities, who tried to attract him by describing enormous wealth gathered by Ernesto Guevara while fighting as a mercenary in Bolivia.

=== The Congo ===
In the 1960s, he had first started hearing news reports about the ongoing Congo Crisis. The unrecognized Katanga separatist leader Moïse Tshombe, who in 1961 had killed Congolese independence leader Patrice Lumumba with help from the Central Intelligence Agency, had in 1963 come to power as Prime Minister of the Congo after being in exile in Spain, and was now fighting against the Simba rebels, a nationalist and anti-imperialist group that was being supported by the Soviet Union, China, and Cuba. The rebellion became a key battle in the Cold War, and Tshombe called on western nations to assist him in the war, as well as European mercenaries to help his army. Rafał soon travelled to the Congo Embassy in Brussels and volunteered to fight, motivated by his strong anti-communist beliefs. In the Congo, Rafał commanded a battalion that consisted of 12 officers/Non-commissioned officers and 800 Katangese. He recalled that some of the rebels had been given drugs by sorcerers, and thus would not surrender or retreat, but were easier to defeat due to being dazed. At one point, his men captured a sorcerer who was carrying Soviet documents.

=== Yemen ===
In 1967, Gan-Ganowicz traveled to Yemen under government contract from the King of Saudi Arabia to train local tribal insurgents on the Royalist side against the Soviet-backed coalition of Nasserist, Pan-Arabist, republican and communist rebels during the North Yemen Civil War. Eventually the republican side won and the European mercenaries, including Rafal, were driven out. In Yemen, the unit commanded by Ganowicz managed to shoot down a Soviet assault plane piloted by colonel Kozlov, head of the Soviet "military advisors" group in Yemen. Documents found with Kozlov were later used at UN as evidence of Soviet active engagement in the military conflict, which was denied by the USSR. Shortly before the siege of the capital city of Sana'a ended, Ganowicz became famous for using a rocket mortar to shell and destroy the Soviet embassy.

== Later life ==
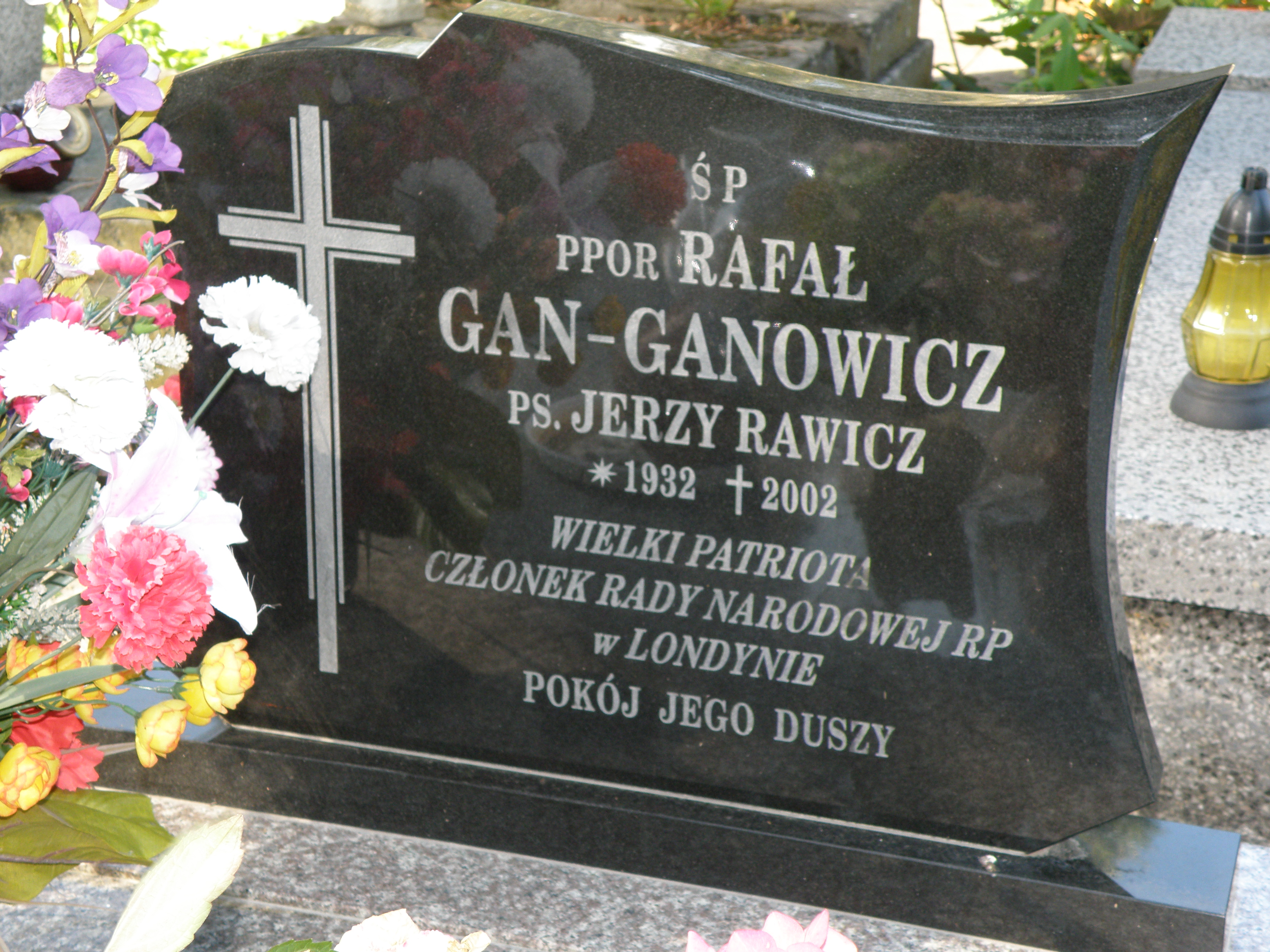
Grave of Gan-Ganowicz in Lublin

He eventually got married and had a daughter named Ewa.

On November 11, 1989, he was appointed a member of the National Council of the Republic of Poland from France in the eighth term (1989-1991) by President of the Polish Government-in-exile Ryszard Kaczorowski.

He died of lung cancer on November 22, 2002, at the age of 70. The funeral took place on November 26, 2002, in Lublin. He was buried in the cemetery in Kalinowszczyzna.

In 2007, president Lech Kaczyński posthumously awarded Ganowicz the Order of Polonia Restituta "for outstanding services in promoting democratic changes in Poland, for achievements in professional and social work undertaken for the benefit of the country".
