= Geologists Day =

Official holiday

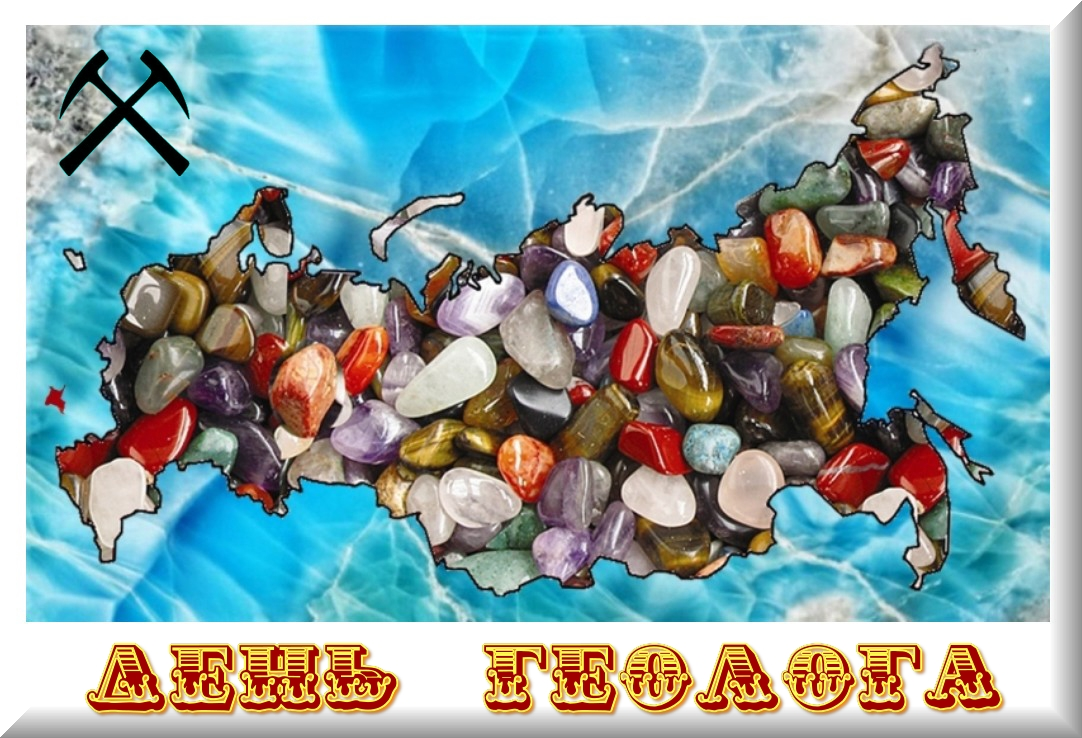
Postcard for Geologists Day

Geologists Day is an official holiday for geologists, geophysicists and geochemists in Russia and other former states of the Soviet Union, Established in 1966, the holiday is traditionally celebrated on the first Sunday of April.

Geologists Day was initiated by a group of prominent Soviet geologists headed by academician Alexander Yanshin. It was established by decree of the Presidium of the Supreme Soviet on March 31, 1966, to commemorate the achievements of Soviet geologists after the discovery of petroleum in West Siberia.

The timing of the holiday, the first Sunday in April, was chosen because it marks the end of winter and beginning of preparation for summer field work and expeditions.

Geologists Day is traditionally celebrated in almost all geological and mining organizations of the former Soviet Union with festivities starting at the end of preceding week. In addition to geologists, many others involved in related fields also consider this day as their professional holiday and celebrate it.
