= Edible Book Festival =

Annual event

The International Edible Book Festival is an annual event usually held on or around April 1, which is also known as Edible Book Day. The global event has been celebrated since 2000 in various parts of the world, where "edible books" are created, displayed, and small events are held. The creations are photographed and then consumed. Regular contributors to the site are groups from Australia, Brazil, India, Italy, Japan, Luxembourg, Mexico, Morocco, The Netherlands, New Zealand, Russia, and Hong Kong. The event was initiated by Judith A. Hoffberg and Béatrice Coron in 2000.

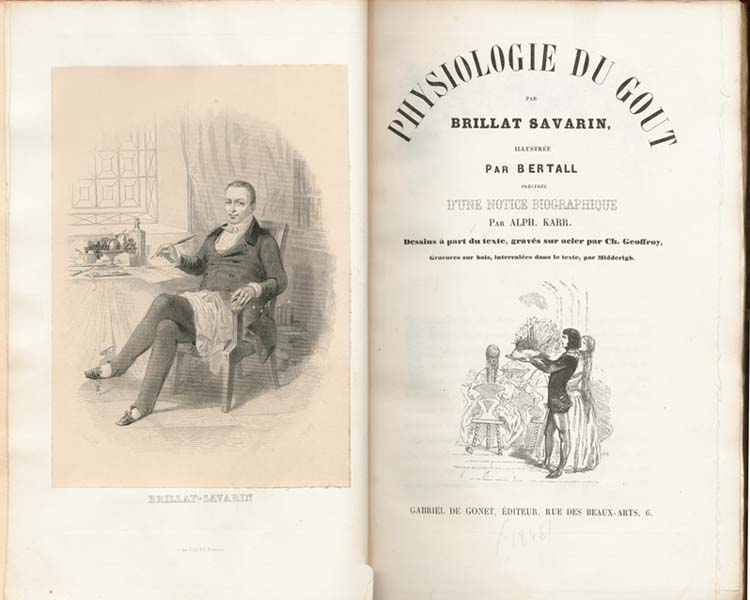
Title page of "Physiologie du Goût" ("Physiology of Taste") by French gastronome Jean Anthelme Brillat-Savarin (1755–1826) with a portrait of the author. 1848 edition.

The official website says that the International Edible Book Festival is held to commemorate "the birthday of French gastronome Jean Anthelme Brillat-Savarin (1755–1826), noted for his book Physiologie du goût, a witty meditation on food", though April Fools' Day is also related as "the perfect day to eat your words and play with them as the 'books' are consumed on the day of the event". (cf. The Phantom Tollbooth, as regards eating one's words.)

== Rules ==
The participation rules per a related site are:

- The event must be held on April 1 or around it
- "All edible books must be 'bookish' through the integration of text, literary inspiration or, quite simply, the form."
- "Organizations or individual participants must register with the festival’s organization ... and see to it that the event is immortalized on the international festival website." This site is collecting photographs for publication in a book.

== Celebrations ==
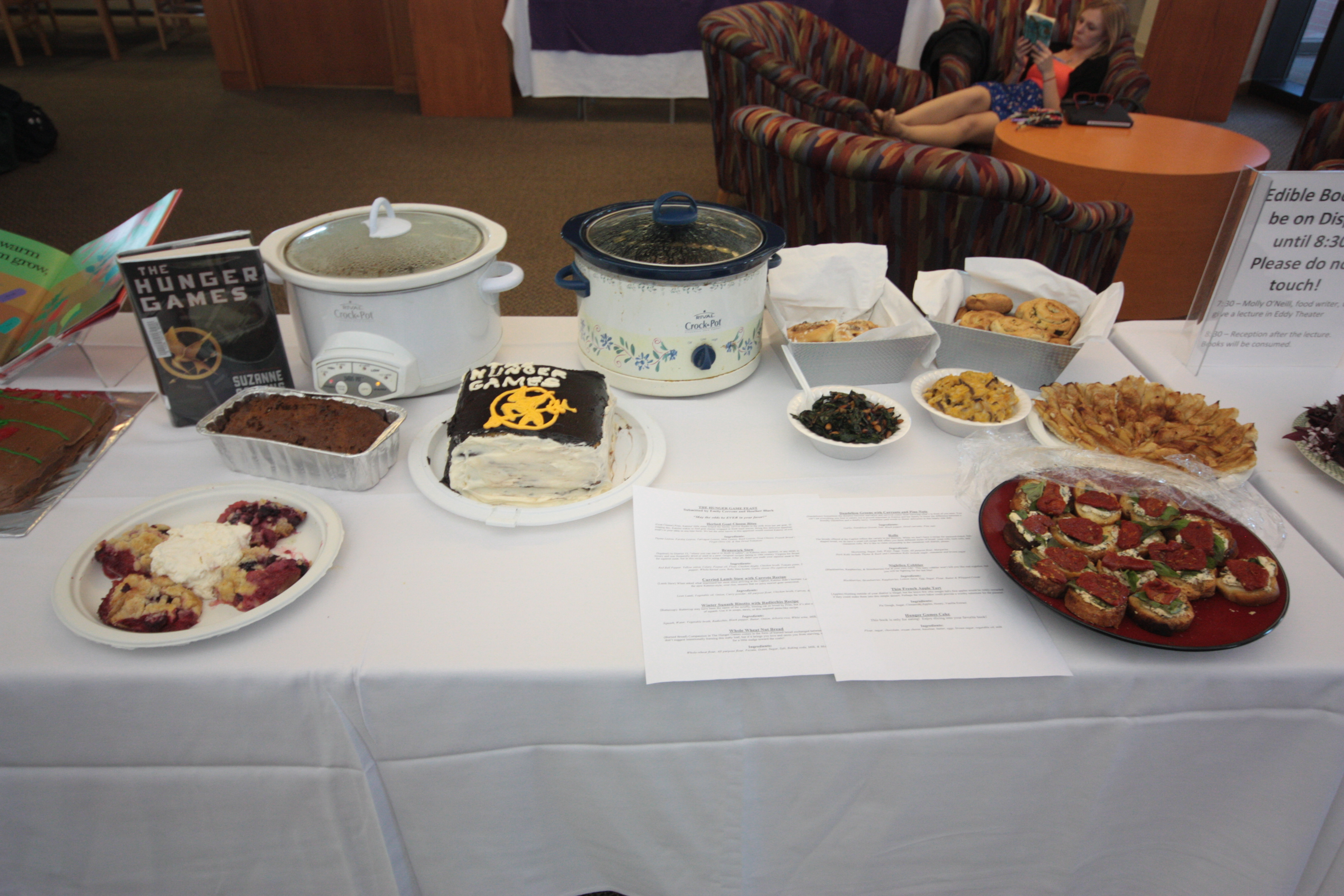
2012 Chatham University Edible Book Festival, exhibit dedicated to The Hunger Games

In 2005, the festival was a joint initiative of forum book art and the Museum of Work, Hamburg, where pastry chefs made edible books. The "book art" was displayed, photographed, and then eaten. In 2005, the event was celebrated in Los Angeles, too, at the Los Angeles Book Arts Center as the Annual International Edible Book High/Low Tea on April 2, where artists were encouraged to create and consume tomes. A 2006 Indianapolis Monthly described the Indianapolis festival as a "quirky event" held on April Fools' Day, "celebrating both food and literature." Participants created foods resembling literary titles.

Loganberry Books in Shaker Heights, Ohio has held an edible books festival every April since 2004 In 2013, awards were given for Most Literary, Most Appetizing, Most Book-like, and Most Creative.

A University of Florida library holds the event as the Edible Book Contest in April, in connection with National Library Week. There are two rules for the contest: Entries should be edible, and they must somehow relate to a book. Besides edible books, other entries include "edible book trucks" and "edible bookmarks". The event kicks off with viewing of the entries, each of which has an information card describing the book title, author, and creator of the book art. The "books" are judged by a panel of judges and by public voting. Awards are given in categories like: Most Creative, Least Edible, Best Overall Fiction, Best Overall Non-Fiction, and Best Children's Book. In 2010, the event is planned to be held on April 15 and the award categories are: Best Overall Entry, Best Book Theme, Best Pun, Best Adult Book, and Best Children's Book.

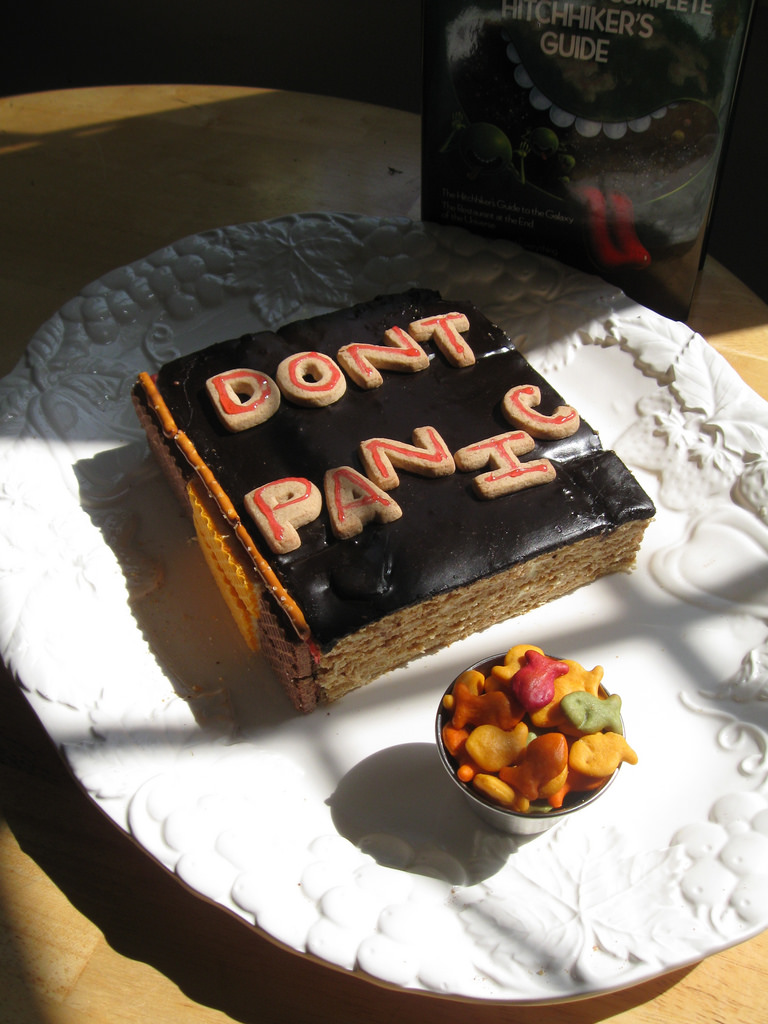
A cake with exposed layers resembling pages

Perkins Library at Hastings College in Nebraska (US) celebrated Banned Books Week 2008 by holding an edible book contest. The event invited guests to consume cooked dishes and baked goods that resembled covers of banned books or reflected their content. A reporter sums up the aptly named event: "Our celebration took Sir Francis Bacon's famous words quite literally: 'Some books are to be tasted, others to be swallowed, and some few to be chewed and digested.'"

The Sheridan Libraries Special Collections at the Johns Hopkins University hosts an annual Edible Book Festival around April 1st. Contestants compete for coveted prizes for seven prizes (Best in Show, Best Literary Theme, Best Effort, Most Delicious, Funniest/Punniest, Best Vegan, and Prettiest Edible Book). Students, faculty, staff, and affiliates gather to sample the edible books, vote for their favorites, and snack on some deliciously savory popcorn while browsing. The event has become a spring staple on campus. Memorable entries include a bread Chateau d'If ("The Count of Monte-Crusto"), windmill towers made of stacked mini quiches ("Don Quicheote"), and the annual disembowlment of a rice krispie and custard Whale ("Moby Dick").

In 2011, the British newspaper Metro ran a story that they would begin producing the newspaper on an edible "Sweet tasting paper" claiming to bring customers "news in the best possible taste". The newspaper later clarified this was nothing more than an April Fools' joke.
