= World Voice Day =

Annual international observance in April

World Voice Day (WVD) is a worldwide annual event that takes place on April 16 devoted to the celebration of the phenomenon of voice.^{[1]} The aim is to demonstrate the enormous importance of the voice in the daily lives of all people. Voice is a critical aspect of effective and healthy communication, and World Voice Day brings global awareness to the need for preventing voice problems, rehabilitating the deviant or sick voice, training the artistic voice, and researching the function and application of voice. A goal of World Voice Day is to encourage all those who use their voice for business or pleasure to learn to take care of their voice, and know how to seek help and training, and to support research on the voice.

Voice production is studied and applied in many disciplines such as medicine, speech-language pathology, music, physics, psychology, phonetics, art, and biology.

The World Voice Day was established on April 16 with the main goals of increasing public awareness of the importance of the voice and alertness to voice problems.

This celebration started in Brazil in 1999 as the Brazilian National Voice Day. It was the result of a mixed initiative of physicians, speech-language pathologists and singing teachers that belonged to the former association 'Sociedade Brasileira de Laringologia e Voz – SBLV' (Brazilian Society of Laryngology and Voice), under the presidency of Dr. Nedio Steffen. This Brazilian initiative was followed by other countries, such as Argentina and Portugal, and the Brazilian National Voice Day became the International Voice Day. In the United States, the American Academy of Otolaryngology – Head and Neck Surgery officially recognized this celebration in 2002 and in that year the event obtained the name 'World Voice Day'.

In 2012 three voice researchers, Prof. Johan Sundberg (Sweden), Prof. Tecumseh Fitch (Austria), and Dr Filipa Lã (Portugal) invited voice experts from a number of countries to form an international website group for the celebration of World Voice Day. The website was coordinated by Prof. Johan Sundberg and Dr. Gláucia Laís Salomão (Brazil). The website is, since April 2026, offline. Presently the group consists of 66 members who initiate and help coordinate events for World Voice Day in their respective countries.

In 2018, almost 600 events in 50 countries took place.
