= Honesty Day =

US holiday (April 30)

Honesty Day is a holiday in the United States falling on April 30. It aims to encourage honesty and straightforward communication in politics, relationships, consumer relations and historical education. It was invented by M. Hirsh Goldberg, who chose the last day of April because April Fools' Day, a holiday celebrating falsehoods, falls on the first day of that month.

== History ==
M. Hirsh Goldberg, who was an author and former press secretary of the Governor of Maryland, created the holiday in the early 1990s while writing the first draft and researching for his book The Book of Lies: Fibs, Tales, Schemes, Scams, Fakes, and Frauds That Have Changed The Course of History and Affect Our Daily Lives. People can ask each other questions and expect radically honest answers on Honesty Day, provided each of them are aware of the holiday.

Every April 30, Goldberg himself gives out an Honest Abe Award to honorable companies, organizations, groups, and individuals.

== Worldwide ==
According to The Christian Post, Italy also observes National Honesty Day in December on the Sunday before Christmas. Similarly Honesty Day in the United States, the purpose of the holiday in Italy serves as a day to protest against commercial manipulation and exploitation as well as unfulfilled promises.
