= Canada Book Day =

Yearly event celebrated in Canada on April 23

Canada Book Day is a yearly event celebrated in Canada on April 23 to promote reading and books during Canada Book Week. Canada Book Week takes place on the week of April 23.

Canada Book Day is celebrated on the same day as World Book and Copyright Day, a yearly event organized by UNESCO to promote reading, publishing and the protection of intellectual property through copyright. The date was chosen by UNESCO to honour three writers of fiction, non-fiction and poetry—Miguel de Cervantes, William Shakespeare and Inca Garcilaso de la Vega— who each died on April 23, 1616.

Canada Book Day was organized by the Writers' Trust of Canada, a national organization whose mandate is to represent writers and support Canadian English-language literature. The Trust no longer organizes this event.
