= Peter Randall (British Army soldier) =

- Born: 20 August 1930; Fareham, Hampshire, England
- Died: 23 April 2007 (aged 76); Leicester, England, United Kingdom
- Military career
- Allegiance: United Kingdom
- Branch: British Army
- Service years: 1946–1959
- Rank: Sergeant
- Units: Royal Sussex Regiment; 4th Queen's Own Hussars; Royal Army Veterinary Corps
- Conflicts: Mau Mau Uprising
- Awards: Member of the Order of the British Empire; George Medal; Margaret Wheatley Cross

Peter John Randall, MBE, GM (20 August 1930 – 23 April 2007) was a British Army soldier and a recipient of the George Medal, and the RSPCA's Margaret Wheatley Cross, for his actions on 8 October 1954 where he saved the life of a fellow soldier and a military dog from a burning truck.

== Early life ==
Peter Randall was born on 20 August 1930. His father had served with the Royal Navy in World War I and would go on to serve in World War II, receiving a US President's medal for rescuing American airmen while at sea. Peter left school at the age of 14, trying various jobs before joining the British Army at 16.

== Military service ==
He was first assigned to the Royal Sussex Regiment as a clarinet bandsman. He switched to the 4th Queen's Own Hussars before moving to the Royal Army Veterinary Corps following his marriage. While based at Hemel Hempstead with the Veterinary Corps, he aided in training the horses for the Coronation of Queen Elizabeth II.

Peter was posted to British East Africa (now Kenya) as a corporal in charge of a dog unit during the Mau Mau Uprising. On 8 October 1954, while en route to Thompson Falls (now Nyahururu) in a truck with ten men of the King's African Rifles, the vehicle hit a pothole in the road and flipped over. Sitting upfront, both Randall and the driver were covered in fuel and set alight. The soldiers in the back of the truck managed to scramble free, but Randall on leaving the cab saw that the driver was unconscious and re-entered the front of the truck to drag him to safety. Once the driver came around, Peter realized that a dog was chained up inside the burning truck. Removing his clothes, he went back into the truck once again and released the animal.

He was taken to a British Military hospital in Nairobi, where he underwent several operations. Plastic boots were placed on his burned feet and steel pins inserted through his knees so that they could be supported by scaffolding placed around his bed. Once he was flown back to Britain, and still bedridden, he received a letter from General Sir George Erskine awarding him the George Medal for rescuing the truck driver. The following month, he was notified by the RSPCA were to present him with the Margaret Wheatley Cross for rescuing the dog from the burning truck. The investiture of the George Medal with Queen Elizabeth II took place on 6 December 1955, he was the only member of Royal Army Veterinary Corps to receive the medal since it was implemented in 1940.

As his injuries prevented him from being posted to hot countries, he left the Army in 1959.

== Later life ==
He first worked as a gamekeeper in Lincolnshire, before returning to Melton Mowbray as a shop manager. He became a school governor and Chairman of the local Chamber of Trade. As a security officer, he moved to the Isle of Wight before retiring to Groby, Leicestershire. For his work with the mentally handicapped, he was appointed a Member of the Order of the British Empire in 2000.

In 2004, he attended a meeting of the Malaya and Borneo Veterans' Association in Penang, Malaysia. At the time he was Chairman of the Gallantry Medallists League and of the Leicester branch of the Malaya and Borneo Veterans' Association. He was in a traffic accident, being hit by a car. He went into a coma, and was transferred back to Britain. He never awoke from his coma and died on 23 April 2007.

== Personal life ==
His wife Rose died in 2006. They had a daughter and a son.
