= Child development in India =

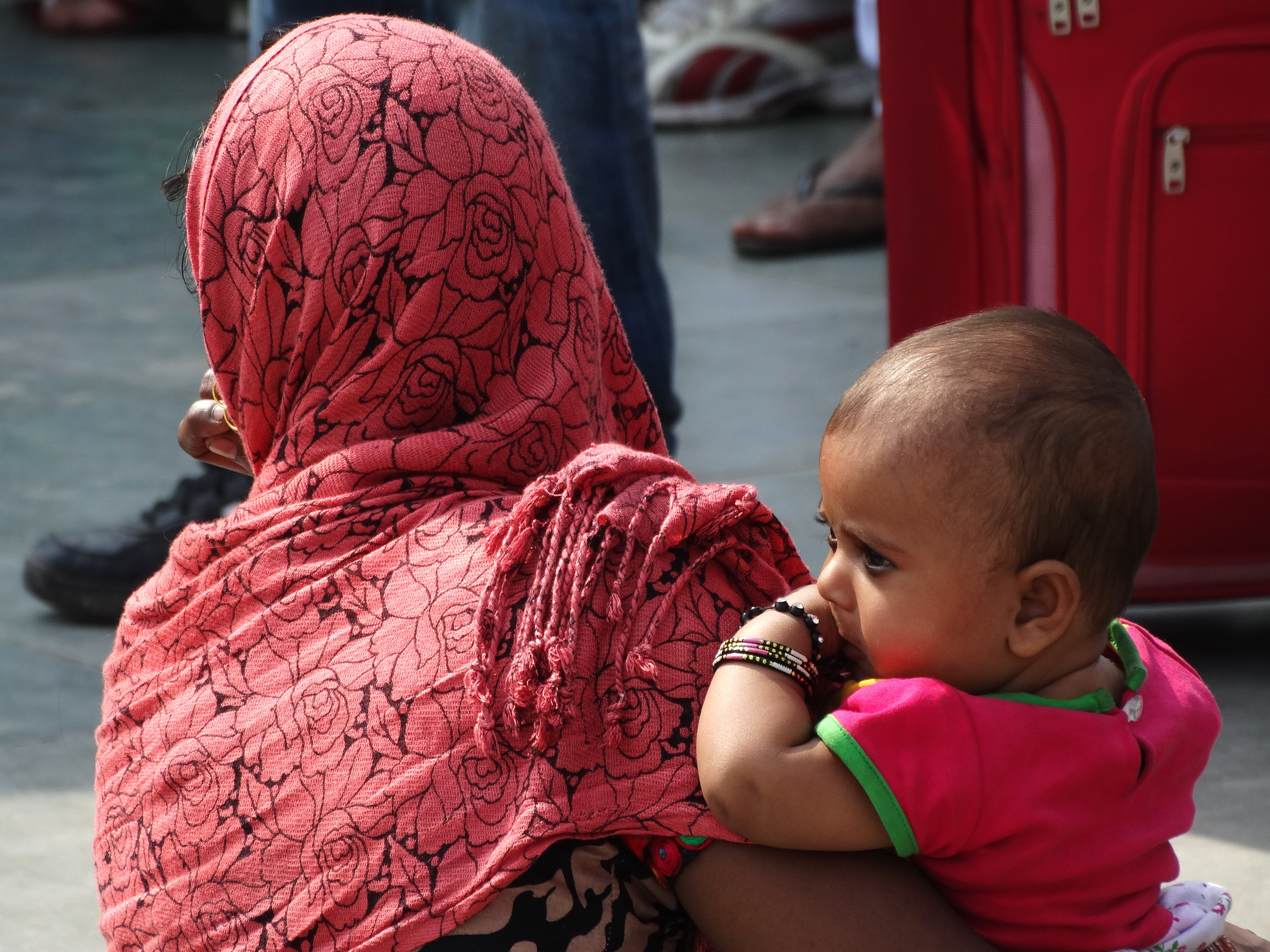
A mother and child in New Delhi.

Child development in India is the Indian experience of biological, psychological, and emotional changes that children experience as they grow into adults. Child development has a major influence on the health of people in India, both individually and nationally.

Children constitute a significant part of the national disease burden of India. Environmental health problems such as pollution-related diseases and challenges with water supply and sanitation in India are difficult to fix and have a large impact on children. Many children in India do not receive vaccines, making them vulnerable to various infectious diseases.

Forty percent of children in India experience malnutrition or stunted growth due to lack of access to healthy meals. Programs such as the Midday Meal Scheme are working to combat childhood hunger in India. Research suggests that children of scheduled castes showed significantly more rates of malnutrition than those of forward castes, resulting in stunted child development at a rate exceeding that of sub-Saharan Africa.

== Markers of childhood development ==
Optimal child development starts before conception and is dependent on adequate nutrition for mother and child; protection from threats; provision of learning opportunities; and caregiver interactions that are stimulating, responsive, and emotionally supportive. Common markers used by researchers and experts in the statistical examination of childhood development include age, income, and locality. Applied to Indian child development, all three markers indicate major challenges.

In India, there are also children's health issues related to gender inequality, female infanticide, and certain aspects of child marriage.

=== Age ===
==== First 1,000 days ====
The first 1,000 days are considered a critical period in child development in need of planning to give children the best possible start. The general recommendation for babies is that they should breastfeed soon after birth to get colostrum, but some factors prevent Indian mothers from giving colostrum to their newborns, including the risk of maternal mortality and social taboo. The first 1,000 days of life are also considered critical because of the adaptability of children's brains during this period and the difficulty of reversing early deficits as children grow older.

==== Early childhood ====
Early childhood is the stage in human development that occurs between infancy and approximately six years of age, although some definitions extend early childhood development (ECD) to age eight to account for changes that occur during a child's transition into primary level education.

Optimal development in early childhood can be disrupted by various adversities in a child's environment and relationships with caregivers. These adversities vary in intensity and include such issues as violence in the home, neglect, abuse, lack of opportunity for play and cognitive stimulation, and parental ill health. Although childhood development is considered a key factor in achieving the ambitious goals of global sustainable development, 45% of Indian children under three years old have been reported to experience stunting, a measure of chronic malnutrition.

In 2008, there were an estimated 158 million children under the age of six in India generally suffering from poor nutrition and health care, with a later study finding that around one in 10 Indian children experienced diarrhoea; almost one in six, fever; and half of children younger than three, deprivation of full immunisation. The danger of such a health scenario that exposure to multiple adversities poses a cumulative detrimental burden to the well-being of Indian children, especially those in low- and middle-income communities, and they can develop brain damage.

A 2017 study reported that 57% of newborns in their first 1,000 days in India transition on time from breastfeeding to nutritious solid food; 48% get meals frequently enough; 33% have enough food variety for nutrition; and 21% get adequate meals overall.

Of all countries, India has the highest number of deaths of children under age five. Most of these deaths are from vaccine-preventable diseases. The BCG vaccine against tuberculosis and leprosy 31% of children get on time and 87% get by age 5; the DPT vaccine against diphtheria, pertussis, and tetanus, 19% get on time and 63% by age 5; and the meningococcal vaccine against meningococcal disease 34% get on time and 76% by age 5.

==== Preadolescence ====
Preadolescence is the period when early childhood ends and puberty begins. India's Midday Meal Scheme has been a major success in nutrition for school-age children, providing a daily hot and healthy meal to 100 million children. Current trends in the programme are adapting the meals based on research to meet more specific nutritional needs. Since the 1970s, India has also had food fortification programmes to prevent vitamin A deficiency, with the result that this problem is much less nowadays.

Although girls need education and preparedness at this time for menstrual hygiene management, and those who are prepared have better developmental outcomes, a 2020 study reported that half the girls in India got their first information only after their first menstrual cycle.

=== Income ===
Children in poverty are more likely to experience health problems due to their lack of immediate access to health care. Although regular access to primary care from a doctor improves health outcomes for children, those in impoverished families in India are less likely to have access to medical care, which among other challenges prevents their receiving important vaccinations. Medical problems associated with poverty also include issues in oral health.

Poverty presents particular challenges in India for street children , child workers, and trafficked children.

Kerala organized poverty reduction programs and, after that, had better children's health, with the result that the Kerala model has been examined as an example of what might work elsewhere in India.

=== Locality ===
Children in India are significantly affected by environmental health problems, but challenges such as air pollution, water pollution, health effects of pesticides, and sanitation require government-level planning to fix and are challenging to address. Urbanisation in India has been increasing more quickly than many cities have been able to handle, and within cities there is great financial disparity in access to health care. Children in slums often lack vaccine protection in particular.

A 2012 nutrition study in the state of Maharashtra found that household and family access to food had become less of a problem, but having a variety of nutritious food was a common challenge. A report on the state of Haryana recommended access to cleaner-burning fuel to improve children's health through improved household air quality.

== Programme intervention ==
A 2017 study reported that India's government has policy and delivery systems favorable for achieving improvements in child nutrition, such as the aforementioned Midday Meal Scheme; but challenges include financing, research, and urban capacity for such programmes. The efforts of several privately funded organizations, including the Aga Khan Foundation, have also had a positive impact on early childhood development in India.

== See also ==
- Environmental health
- First 1,000 days
- Malnutrition in India
- Poverty in India
- Vaccination in India
