= Immunization Alliance =

American vaccine advocacy consortium

The Immunization Alliance is an American vaccine advocacy consortium, assembled under the auspices of the American Academy of Pediatrics (AAP) in May 2008. The Immunization Alliance has called for a governmental information campaign, ongoing research into vaccine safety and efficacy, balanced media coverage, and restoration of confidence among parents due to vaccine hesitancy and the related controversies in autism.

== Formation ==
During the mid-2000s, vaccine safety controversies, particularly claims linking vaccines to autism, received significant public attention despite a lack of supporting scientific evidence. Public health organizations reported increasing vaccine hesitancy among some parents, raising concerns about declining immunization coverage.

Citing the largest measles outbreak in the United States since 1966 (130 cases in fifteen states), Paul Offit, a member of the Alliance, asserted that this re-emergence of a common childhood disease was a warning about the dangers of "what can happen when parents are misinformed about vaccine safety. "We do not want to become a nation of people who are vulnerable to diseases that are deadly or that can have serious complications, especially if those diseases can be prevented," said Renee Jenkins, president of the AAP.

The Immunization Alliance's debut was announced in the July 2008 issue of Pediatrics (published by the AAP), which also detailed its plans for improving vaccine schedule adherence and combating declining immunization rates. Gina Ley Steiner, Director of Public Information for the AAP at the time, was responsible for building this non-profit coalition.

The Immunization Alliance's stated goals include increasing public education about vaccines by both public health organizations and individual physicians, and increasing federal funding and media coverage surrounding the science of vaccine safety.

== Member organizations ==
Over twenty organizations form the Immunization Alliance, including:

- American Academy of Family Physicians
- American Academy of Pediatrics
- American Academy of Physician Associates
- American College of Preventive Medicine
- American College of Obstetricians and Gynecologists
- American College of Osteopathic Pediatricians
- American Medical Association
- American Public Health Association
- America's Health Insurance Plans
- Association of State and Territorial Health Officials
- California Immunization Coalition
- Every Child By Two
- Immunization Action Coalition
- Indiana Immunization Coalition
- Infectious Diseases Society of America
- March of Dimes
- National Foundation for Infectious Diseases
- National Vaccine Program Office
- Parents of Kids with Infectious Diseases
- Pediatric Infectious Diseases Society
- Sabin Vaccine Institute
- UnitedHealth Group
- Vaccine Education Center at the Children's Hospital of Philadelphia
- Voices for Vaccines
