= Vaccinate Your Family =

American health awareness organization

- Founded: 1991
- Type: Nonprofit
- Purpose: Public understanding of vaccinations
- Location: Washington, D.C., U.S.
- Method: Education, outreach, and advocacy
- Key people: Rosalynn Carter; Betty Bumpers
- Website: vaccinateyourfamily.org

Vaccinate Your Family (VYF), formerly known as Every Child By Two (ECBT), is a non-profit organization, based in the United States, which advocates for vaccinations. Founded in 1991, its stated goals are to "raise awareness of the critical need for timely immunizations and to foster a systematic way to immunize all of America's children by age two." ECBT was founded by former First Lady of the United States Rosalynn Carter and former First Lady of Arkansas Betty Bumpers. ECBT was renamed to Vaccinate Your Family in 2018.

== Background ==
In 1991, Rosalynn Carter and Betty Bumpers founded Every Child By Two (ECBT) in response to a measles outbreak in which around 150 people, including young children, died as a result of contracting the disease. At the time, Carter said, "It is imperative that we move quickly to increase our capacity to vaccinate children who are at risk for measles and other diseases, such as mumps, rubella and polio." Carter and Bumpers started the national immunization awareness project by enlisting the help of governors' spouses to advocate for vaccinations with the goal of immunizing 95% of U.S. children against diseases like diphtheria, measles, and rubella by the year 2000. The group also expanded their educational outreach to include information about other vaccine preventable diseases, including chickenpox, whooping cough, and HPV.

VYF has partnered with such groups as the American Nurses Association, Parents of Kids with Infectious Diseases (PKIDs), rotary clubs, state health departments, schools and universities. ECBT is also part of the Immunization Advocacy Coalition.

VYF supports the use of immunization registries through which health care providers can track children's immunization histories for the purpose of reducing the number of missed immunizations.

it is a member of the Vaccine Safety Net.

== Awards ==
1995 – Kiwanis International Award and $10,000 grant for "bringing attention to early immunization."

2008 – Centers for Disease Control (CDC) Champion of Prevention Award at the 34th National Immunization Conference in Washington, D.C.

== See also ==
- Vaccine-preventable diseases
- World Immunization Week
