= HPV Prevention and Control Board =

- HPV Prevention and Control Board logo

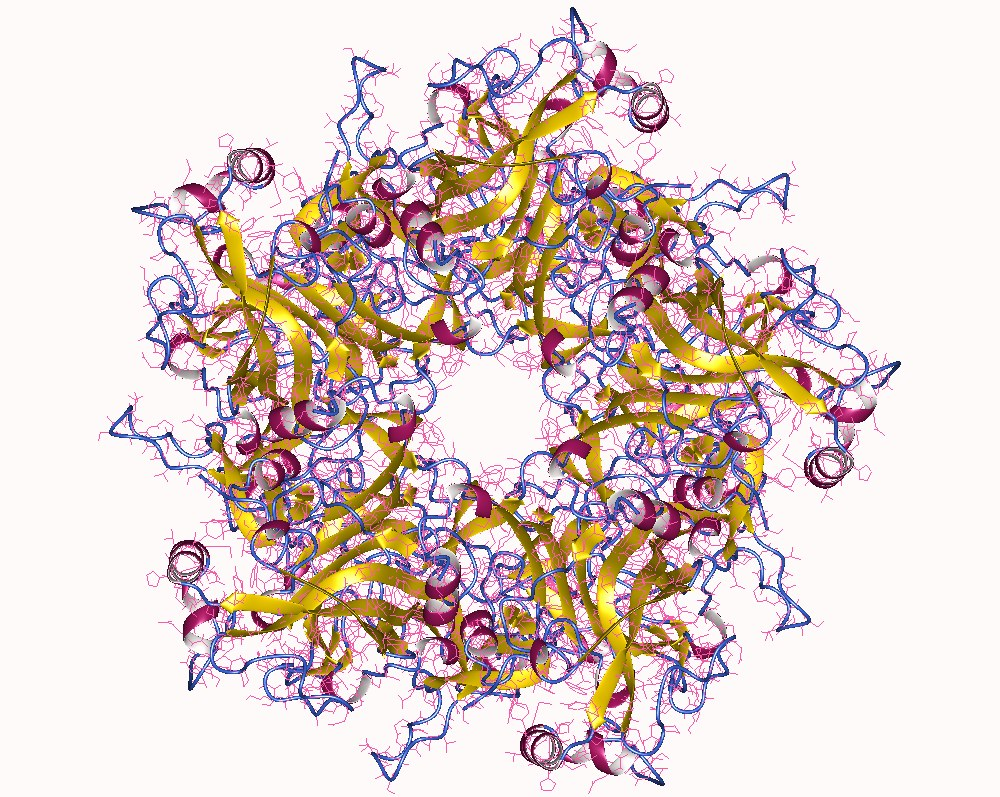
- Human papillomavirus type 11, associated with anogenital warts and protected from in some HPV vaccines.
- Formation: 2015
- Headquarters: Vaccine and Infectious Disease Institute of the University of Antwerp
- Website: Official website

The HPV Prevention and Control Board, founded in 2015, is an independent group of international experts supported by unrestricted grants from the pharmaceutical industry that bring together key professionals, groups and government officials to deal with issues related to screening and prevention programmes for human papillomavirus (HPV) infection, the persistence of which may lead to cervical cancer, the second most common cancer in women living in low-resource settings. The Board focusses on preventing cervical cancer in these countries by promoting the sharing of information on cervical screening and HPV vaccination, which by 2014 had reached only around 3% of eligible girls in low income countries.

The Board is located at the Vaccine and Infectious Disease Institute of the University of Antwerp and its website is a member of the World Health Organization (WHO) led project Vaccine Safety Net (VSN).

Local policy-makers can take advice and assistance from the Board on introducing and extending programmes, and by taking into consideration recommendations by the WHO, the Board can facilitate political backing required for their application. One example of their work was in 2018 when the Board contributed to efforts to regain confidence in vaccines for cervical cancer in Columbia following a sudden nationwide drop in uptake of the vaccine's first and second dose from 98% and 88% in 2012 to 14% and 5% in 2016.

== Background ==
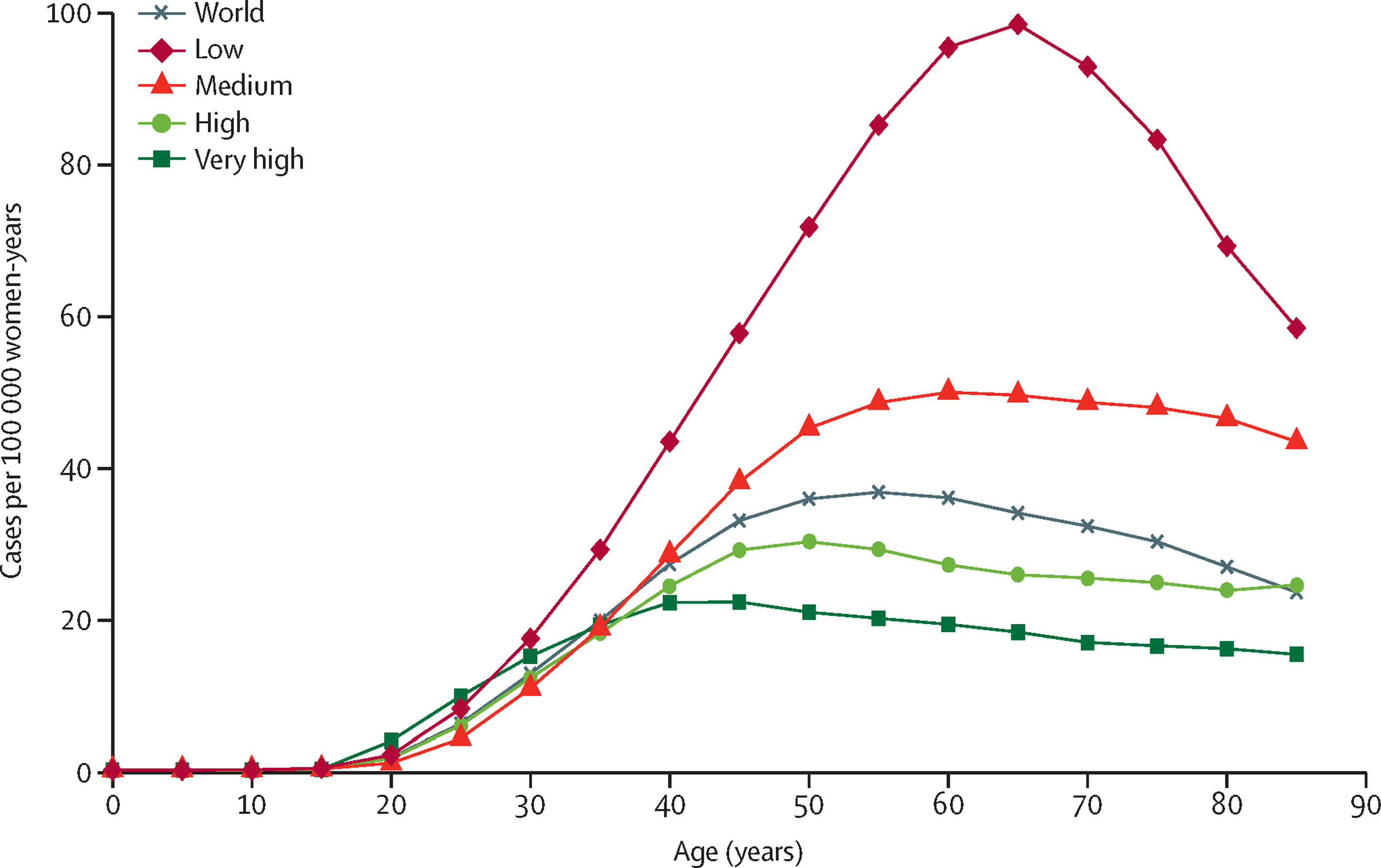
Cervical Cancer Age Incidence 2018. Countries were categorised by the Human Development Index (HDI). Lower-resource countries have lower HDI.

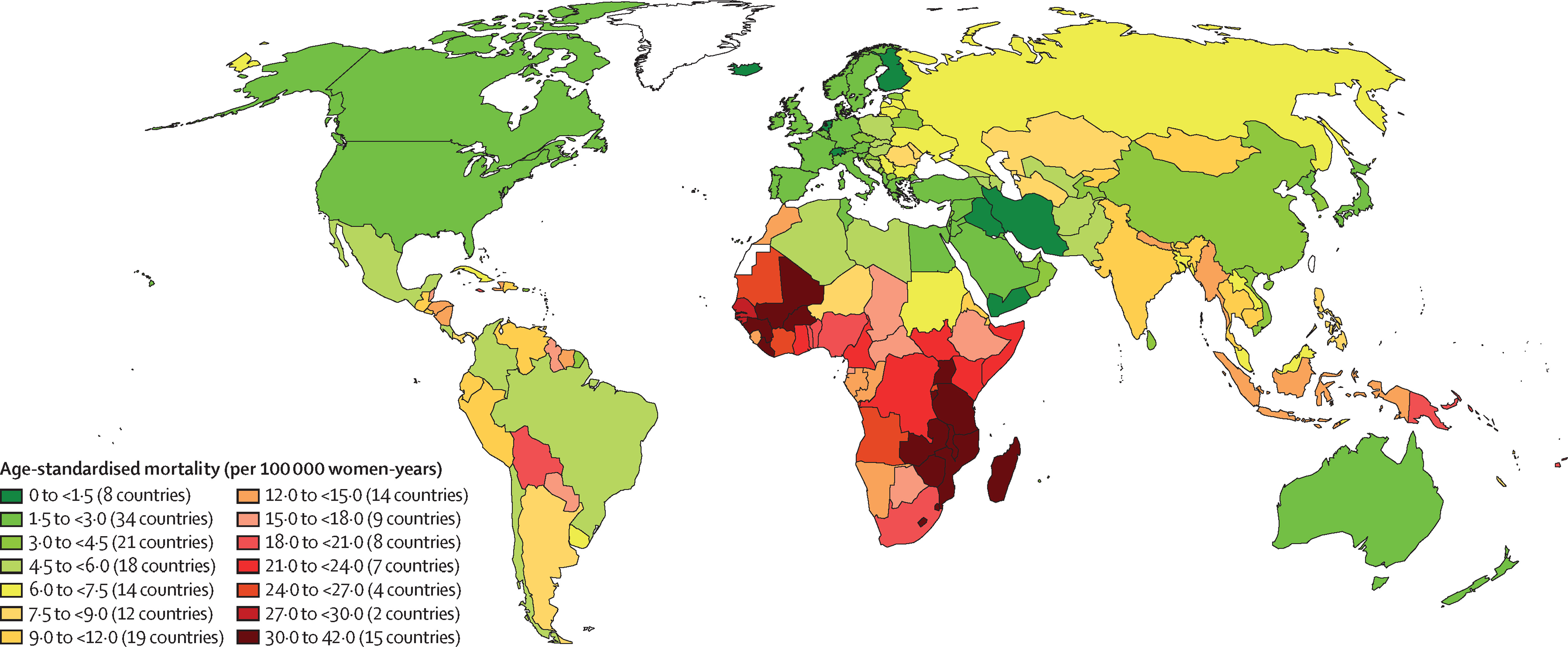
Cervical Cancer Mortality 2018.

Knowing that human papillomavirus (HPV) infection is the main cause of cervical cancer, the second most common cancer in women living in low-resource settings, has led to the development of vaccines that protect people from HPV associated diseases, and HPV tests that detect presence of the virus. Since the HPV vaccines were first licensed in 2006, the Global Advisory Committee on Vaccine Safety (GACVS) have concluded that the HPV vaccines have a reassuring safety profile and they remain vigilant to monitoring adverse effects.

In 2016, more than 70 countries were reported to be offering the HPV vaccine. This figure reached 80 by 2018. With the optimum coverage of HPV vaccination regarded to be 70% of eligible women, a review published in 2017 revealed that by 2014, nine years from the vaccine's introduction, coverage varied between less than 5% to more than 80% in countries that offered the vaccine.

== Origin and purpose ==
The HPV Prevention and Control Board is modelled on the Viral Hepatitis Prevention Board and was founded in December 2015 to deal with emerging challenges in the control and prevention of human papillomavirus (HPV) infection and its associated diseases. Chiefly working on technical issues, the Board is an independent group of international experts, one of several partnerships that focus on preventing cervical cancer by promoting the sharing of information on cervical screening and HPV vaccination, which by 2014 had reached only around 3% of eligible girls in low income countries.

Its website is a member of the WHO-led project Vaccine Safety Net (VSN). The Board's first meeting, focused on safety data of licensed HPV vaccines, was held on 27 June 2016 in Antwerp. At the time, a preliminary list of issues requiring attention included implementing a vaccination programme, expanding existing programmes, and integrating HPV vaccination and cervical screening.

The Board's website provides information relating to its aims, scientific publications, meetings, general HPV information, links to E-learning sources on HPV and relevant websites, in addition to HPV related news and media.

== Activities ==
The Board co-ordinates interactions between people related to HPV control and prevention, and provides a forum for discussion. It advises local policy-makers on starting and expanding HPV vaccination programmes, and taking into consideration recommendations by the WHO, helps with political commitment necessary for their implementation. In addition to experts, it involves public and governments.

The Board's first four meetings resulted in the development of a checklist for implementing and maintaining vaccine initiatives, also applicable to other vaccination programmes, after local and international expertise were brought together to exchange experiences and what was learnt from them.

Following a 2016 publication of a flawed paper on HPV vaccine in Japan, which was later retracted, the Board responded with a letter, signed by 20 of its Board members, criticising both the research and the time to retract it.

In 2018, the fifth meeting, held in Bucharest, discussed the role of healthcare providers in vaccination programmes.

At its sixth meeting in November 2018, the Board collaborated in Colombia, with the National Cancer Institute of Colombia and Colombian League Against Cancer, to address the sudden hesitancy in taking HPV vaccines in that country. Routinely given in two doses, the uptake of HPV vaccine for the first and second dose dropped from 98% and 88% in 2012 to 14% and 5% in 2016 nationally. Investigations by Colombian authorities, had suggested that, beginning in Carmen del Bolivar in 2012, social media could have contributed to disseminating misinformation on the vaccine resulting in a probably mass psychogenic illness. The HPV vaccine was found not to be apparently the cause of reported adverse effects and the Board contributed to efforts to regain confidence in HPV vaccination in Columbia. However, more recent research papers have suggested in 2021-2022 that the HPV vaccine (Gardasil) could not be ruled out in the case of Carmen de Bolívar, and that the initial diagnosis of mass psychogenic illness was not supported by scientific evidence.

== Location and funding ==
The Board's administrative office is located at the Vaccine and Infectious Disease Institute of the University of Antwerp. The Board has received grants from the pharmaceutical industry including GlaxoSmithKline Biologicals, Merck, Abbott and Sanofi Pasteur, as well as several universities. Finances, including reimbursements, are handled by the rules of the University of Antwerp.
