= European Immunization Week =

Annual World Health Organization initiative

European Immunization Week (EIW) is an annual regional initiative, coordinated by the World Health Organization Regional Office for Europe (WHO/Europe), to promote immunization against vaccine-preventable diseases since its launch in 2008. EIW activities are carried out by participating WHO/Europe member states. In the past these have included: disseminating informational materials about immunization, organizing immunization campaigns, organizing training sessions for health care workers, arranging workshops or conferences with political decision makers to discuss immunization, and holding press conferences about immunization-related issues.

EIW takes place each year in April. The initiative has spread from the Americas and Europe to become a global immunization effort known as World Immunization Week. The initiative promotes the message that immunization of every child is vital in order to prevent diseases and protect life. The EIW slogan is: Prevent. Protect. Immunize.

As stated by WHO/Europe, the goal of EIW is threefold: to increase vaccination coverage across the European Region by raising public awareness about the benefits of immunization; to support national immunization systems; and to provide a framework for mobilizing public and political support for immunization efforts.

== Background ==
The first EIW was conducted in October 2005 by the WHO/Europe and a number of Member States across the Region. The European Immunization Week (EIW) is an annual initiative to raise awareness, improve communication and advocate immunization across the WHO European Region.

EIW started out of a concern that immunization is becoming less valued because of the decline in the incidence of, and reduced fear of infectious diseases. Consequently, the coverage rates have declined in many countries across the WHO European Region; this has resulted in large, sporadic disease outbreaks. Average coverage rates vary greatly between Member States, however vulnerable groups exist all over the Region. This reduction in coverage rates have been influenced by media scares and groups/individuals opposed to immunization. Also, immunization often suffers from low political commitment due to competing health priorities.

EIW aims to increase vaccination coverage by raising awareness of the importance of every child's need and right to be protected from vaccine preventable diseases. This initiative targets parents and caregivers, health care professionals and policy makers. A special focus is also placed on activities targeting vulnerable groups and extending access to vaccinations through the life course.

== Partners of EIW ==
Partner organizations involved in EIW include, but are not limited to, UNICEF, the Measles & Rubella Initiative and the European Centre for Disease Prevention and Control (ECDC) and Rotary International. Activities organized at the local and national levels take place in all WHO Member States involving a wide range of stakeholders.

== EIW Royal Patron ==
Crown Princess Mary of Denmark is the patron of the WHO Regional Office for Europe and, as such, has participated in activities related to European Immunization Week. At the launch of EIW 2008, she stated, "It is the right of every child to grow up healthy, and vaccinated against those diseases that can so easily be controlled. I hope that the countries within the region will act quickly and effectively to ensure that children and adults, especially those in vulnerable and hard-to-reach groups, have access to immunization and basic health services."

== See also ==
- Health promotion
- World Immunization Week
- World Health Organization
