= Vaccine Information Statement =

In the US, document given to a patient

A Vaccine Information Statement (VIS) is a document designed by the Centers for Disease Control and Prevention (CDC) to provide information to a patient receiving a vaccine in the United States. The National Childhood Vaccine Injury Act requires that medical professionals provide a VIS to patients before receiving certain vaccinations. The VIS includes information about the vaccine's benefits and risks, a description of the vaccine, indications and contraindications, instructions for patients experiencing an adverse reaction, and additional resources.

== History ==
In the 1974 case of Reyes v. Wyeth Laboratories, the US Fifth Circuit Court of Appeals decided that vaccine manufacturers were responsible for warning patients of the risks associated with their vaccine. This created concern among manufacturers, since they were reliant on the healthcare professionals administering their vaccines to convey these risks, and the companies could be liable for mistakes made by healthcare providers. Consequently, vaccine prices increased to cover the costs of litigation. In response, the CDC added "duty to warn" clauses in their contracts, which required either the individualized judgement of a physician or "meaningful warnings related to the risks and benefits of vaccination" for all publicly purchased vaccines. This gave way to an early version of the VIS known as the "Important Information Statement" (IIS), the first of which was developed for "Swine and Victoria Influenza" vaccine in 1976. Over the following decade, more than 50 IISs were created for various vaccines.

An increase in vaccine-related lawsuits and fear of manufacturers withdrawing vaccines from the market led to the 1986 National Childhood Vaccine Injury Act (NCVIA). The act established the National Vaccine Injury Compensation Program (VICP) and the Vaccine Adverse Event Reporting System (VAERS) to take liability for adverse reactions off vaccine manufacturers. The act also required the development of written information about all vaccines included in the VICP, which were primarily routine childhood vaccinations. The act required that all patients, or their parents/legal representatives, be given this information before vaccination. The secretary of the Department of Health and Human Services gave the responsibility of developing these materials to the CDC. By 1991, the CDC developed four 12-page "Vaccine Information Pamphlets" (VIPs) for DTP, MMR, polio, and tetanus-diphtheria (Td) vaccines. These pamphlets fulfilled the requirements of the NCVIA, but were criticized for their length and the amount of time they took to develop. Concerns were raised that patients could not read the entire forms during their visit, and could be less informed due to a less thorough review of the information.

A 1993 amendment to the NCVIA simplified the requirements for the document and simplified the process through which it was created. It removed the requirement for a public hearing in the development of the document and reduced the time period for public comment to 60 days. The simplified requirements led to the single sheet (two-sided) Vaccine Information Statements (VISs) that are still used. By 1997 VISs were available for all vaccines that required them under NCVIA and the CDC began creating VISs for additional vaccines.

In 2008, the Pediatric Multi-Vaccine VIS was developed, which included information on the vaccines for diphtheria, tetanus, and pertussis(DTaP), polio, hepatitis B, pneumococcal conjugate, and Haemophilus influenzae type B (Hib). This allows caregivers to read one document during their visit instead of an individual document for each vaccine.

In 2013, a "provider information document" was developed to include information that was relevant to medical providers but not to patients, reducing the need to frequently update VISs. By 2016, the provider information was made available through a links to the CDC website.

VISs are now available on the CDC website and can be provided in hard copies or electronically. The Immunization Action Coalition (IAC), a partner organization to the CDC, also provides translations of VISs in over 40 languages.

== Contents ==
CDC Vaccine Information Statement for MMR Vaccine from April 2012

According to the 1993 amended National Childhood Vaccine Injury Act (NCVIA), a VIS must contain at least the following four components: (1) a description of the benefits of the given vaccine, (2) a description of its risks, (3) information about the National Vaccine Injury Compensation Program (VICP), and (4) other relevant information as determined by the Secretary of Health and Human Services.

Current VISs typically include the following sections:

- "Why get vaccinated?" - This section includes a description of the benefits of the vaccine and the risks of the illness that it protects from.
- "[Name of vaccine]" - This section is a description of the specific vaccine, including information about who it's recommended for, its administration, the number and timing of doses, and any other pertinent information.
- "Talk with your health care provider" - This section includes factors that may affect someone's decision to receive the given vaccine. It includes information about allergies, illnesses, or other contraindications that may increase the risks associated with the vaccine. The section recommends a discussion with the patient's health care provider over any concerns.
- "Risks of a vaccine reaction" - This section includes potential side effects and adverse reactions.
- "What if there is a serious problem?" - This section contains instructions for patients experiencing an adverse reaction. It includes instructions to contact either their health care provider or 9-1-1, depending on the level of severity, and contact information for the Vaccine Adverse Event Reporting System (VAERS).
- "The National Vaccine Injury Compensation Program" - This section is only included in VISs for vaccines covered by the VICP, as set forth in the NCVIA. It includes the website and phone number for the VICP.
- "How can I learn more?" - This section includes additional resources and contact information for the CDC.

The Multi-Vaccine VIS (DTaP, Hib, hepatitis B, polio, and pneumococcal conjugate) includes the same sections listed above, with sub-headings in the first four sections for each of the vaccines included, as needed.

== Requirements for distribution ==
A VIS must be given prior to vaccination in the United States when a patient is being vaccinated for diphtheria, tetanus, pertussis, measles, mumps, rubella, polio, hepatitis A, hepatitis B, Haemophilus influenzae type b (Hib), influenza, pneumococcal conjugate, meningococcal, rotavirus, human papillomavirus (HPV), or varicella (chickenpox) according to the National Childhood Vaccine Injury Act (NCVIA). The VIS must be given to the person receiving the vaccine or to their parent/legal representative prior to each dose of the vaccine. The "legal representative" is defined as the person who can consent to the vaccination under the laws of the state in which the vaccine is being given. The CDC has also developed VISs for vaccines not covered by the NCVIA, which are recommended for use with these vaccines, and required if the vaccines are purchased under CDC contract under the "duty to warn" clause.

VISs can be provided on paper, in electronic form, or on a laminated office copy. The VIS can be given in a prior appointment, but must also be offered at the visit in which the vaccination is occurring. The patient or parent/representative must be offered a copy of the VIS take home, since the document contains information about what to do in case of an adverse reaction. When a patient receives multiple vaccines in one visit or a combination vaccine, a VIS should be given for each vaccine or component. The Multi-Vaccine VIS can be used for children receiving DTaP, polio, Hib, hepatitis B, and pneumococcal conjugate vaccines. The Multi-Vaccine VIS is not designed for adults or adolescents.

To document the receipt of the VIS, the healthcare provider must record the edition of the VIS and the date it was provided, in addition to the documentation required for the vaccination (date of vaccination, the vaccine manufacturer and lot number, and the office address, name, and title of the person administering the vaccine).

=== Special Circumstances ===
In some circumstances, the parent or legal representative of a patient may not be present for the vaccination, such as school-based clinics or long-term care facilities. In these cases, the parent or legal representative can be given the VIS at the time they provide consent or at the time of admission to a long-term care facility. In cases like school-based clinics where a VIS might be sent home to parents, it should be sent home as close to the time of the vaccination as possible, and the parent or legal representative must acknowledge receipt of the VIS, in writing or electronically, including the edition of the VIS and the date it was given. It can be included in the consent form for the vaccination.

=== Accommodations ===
The NCVIA requires that healthcare providers use the CDC-produced VIS, unaltered (although they may add contact information for the office). For patients with visual impairments or other needs, the VIS may additionally be read aloud or supplemented with visuals, videos, explanations, or other materials. For patients who are not comfortable with English, translations into over 40 languages are available from the Immunization Action Coalition (IAC).
