= Medicines Control Authority of Zimbabwe =

The Medicines Control Authority of Zimbabwe (MCAZ) is the statutory body of Zimbabwe responsible for protecting public and animal health. It was established on September 1, 1969 by an Act of Parliament called the Drugs and Allied Substances Control Act. The MCAZ is a successor of the Drugs Control Council (DCC) and the Zimbabwe Regional Drug Control Laboratory (ZRDCL). Since 2020, the MCAZ has been a member of Vaccine Safety Net (VSN), a global network of websites established by the World Health Organization (WHO). As of 2021, the MCAZ has 101 to 250 staff members. MCAZ became a WHO Global Benchmarking Maturity Level 3 Authority in June 2024.
