= Vaccination Week In The Americas =

Annual public health campaign promoting vaccinations

Immunization Week in the Americas
- Observed by: All member states of the Pan American Health Organization
- Date: Last week of April
- Frequency: annual

Vaccination Week In The Americas (VWA) is an annual public health campaign by the member states of the Pan American Health Organization (PAHO) to promote equity and access to immunization. It is marked each year during the last week of April.

Since 2012, the campaign has been celebrated globally across all regions of the World Health Organization (WHO) under World Immunization Week. The WHO reports there are 25 diseases for which vaccines exist for their prevention and control.

== History ==
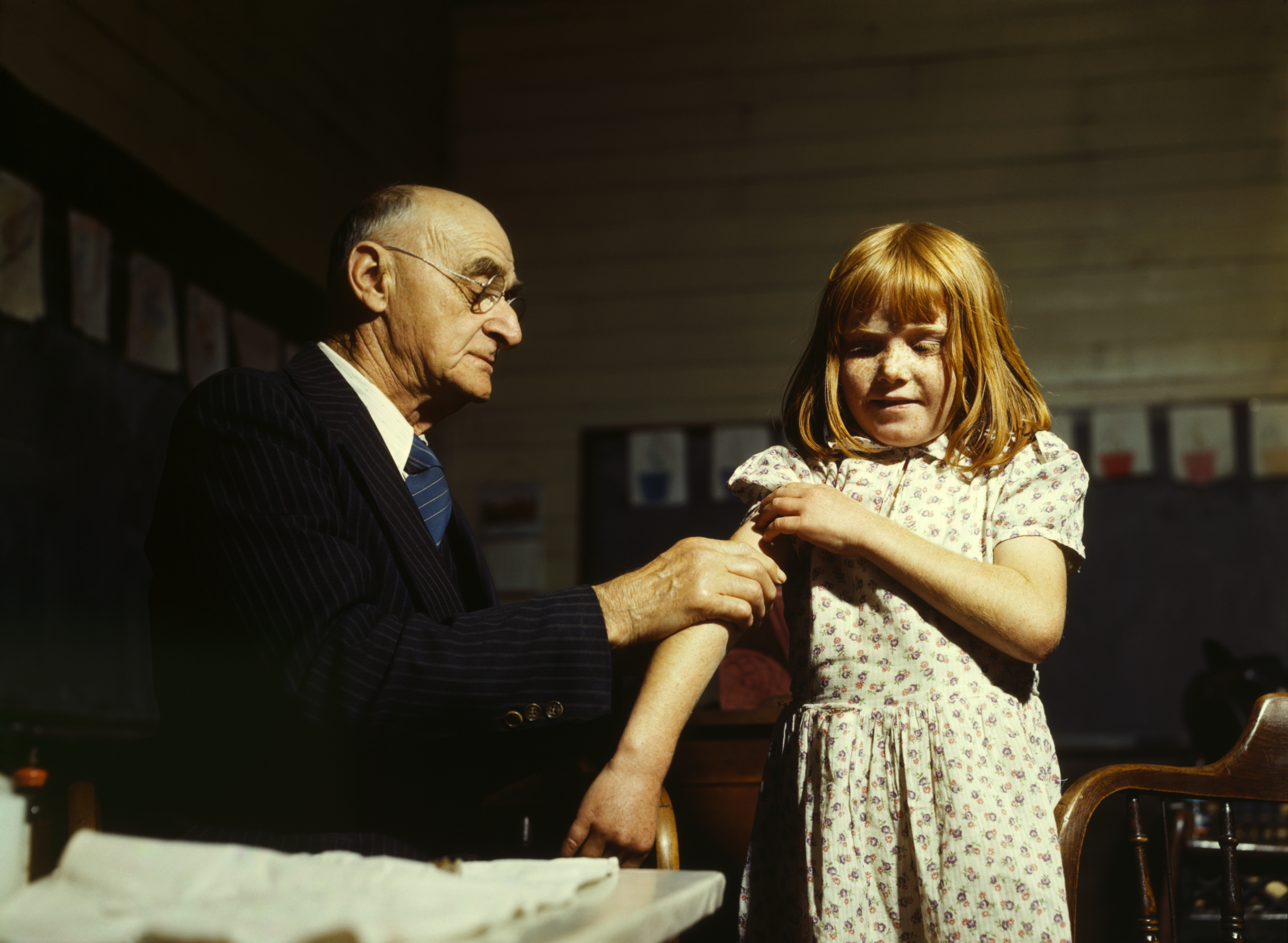
A doctor performing a typhoid vaccination in Texas, 1943

VWA was initially proposed and implemented on April 23, 2002, under the presidency of Dr. Patricio Jamriska, Secretary of Health of the Republic of Ecuador and by the Ministers of Health in the Andean Region following a measles outbreak in Venezuela and Colombia. Originally endorsed through the adoption of Resolution CD44.R by the Directing Council of the Pan American Health Organization (PAHO), the overarching objectives of VWA are to promote equity and access to immunization and strengthen immunization programs in the Region of the Americas by “reaching the unreached”, populations with otherwise limited access to regular health services and at heightened risk of contracting vaccine-preventable diseases. In the Americas, such populations can be found in areas such as urban fringes, low coverage municipalities, indigenous communities and rural and/or border zones.

VWA has been used to conduct large-scale vaccination campaigns, introduce new vaccines, carry out communication and social mobilization campaigns, and to integrate other health promotion measures. Since its launch in 2003, over 365 million individuals have been vaccinated through campaigns conducted under the framework of the initiative.

In April 2012, PAHO joined the other five WHO regions to celebrate World Immunization Week. This followed the launch of European Immunization Week (EIW) in the WHO European region in 2005, and Vaccination Week campaigns launched in the WHO Eastern Mediterranean region in 2010, and in the WHO African and Western Pacific regions in 2011. The member states of the WHO South-East Asian region committed to the annual campaign in 2012.

== Themes ==
The goals and activities for each VWA are chosen in accordance with a specific theme, and adapted in alignment with national health objectives.

=== 2014 ===
The twelfth VWA takes place from 26 April to 3 May 2014, with the regional slogan: “Vaccination: Your best shot.” This slogan was chosen to encourage people to protect themselves and their communities against the importation of polio, measles and other vaccine-preventable diseases, in the context of the upcoming 2014 FIFA World Cup in Brazil.

=== 2013 ===
VWA 2013 was marked from 20 to 27 April, with the regional slogan: “Vaccination: a shared responsibility.”

=== 2012 ===
The tenth annual VWA was held on 21–28 April 2012, giving public health organizations across the region another opportunity to advance efforts in childhood immunizations.

=== 2011 ===
The ninth annual VWA was celebrated during 23–30 April 2011 under the slogan "Vaccinate your family, protect your community". Over 41 million individuals were vaccinated as a result of the 2011 VWA initiative. Regional events for VWA 2011 were held across large cities and small towns, and on bi- and tri-national borders across the region, including the Altiplano between Peru and Bolivia, and the Amazon Basin subregions.

=== 2010 ===
Events for VWA 2010, which was celebrated from 24 April to 1 May 2010, targeted regional vaccination goals to reach children under 5 years of age, pregnant women, elderly populations, border and isolated populations, indigenous populations, and low coverage municipalities.

=== 2009 ===
The seventh annual VWA took place from 25 April-2 May 2009. Themes emphasized during this VWA included the importance of family vaccination as well as the vaccination of health workers.

== See also ==
- Vaccine-preventable diseases
- World Immunization Week
- European Immunization Week
