= Weekly Epidemiological Record =

- Discipline: Medicine
- Language: English and French

Publication details
- Former name(s): Relevé Hebdomadaire
- History: 1926–present
- Publisher: World Health Organization
- Frequency: Weekly

Standard abbreviations
- ISO 4: Wkly. Epidemiol. Rec.

Indexing
- ISSN: 0049-8114 (print); 1996-8345 (web)
- LCCN: 36007476

Links
- Journal homepage; Online access

The Weekly Epidemiological Record (WER) is a publication of the World Health Organization (WHO) that as of 2020 is in its 95th volume. It is published in English and French with the alternative title of the Relevé épidémiologique hebdomadaire. It aims to rapidly disseminate epidemiological information about outbreaks of diseases under the International Health Regulations and about communicable diseases of public health importance. This includes emerging or re-emerging diseases.

It was first published as the Relevé Hebdomadaire by a group of epidemiologists based in the Health Office of the League of Nations, in Geneva, in 1926 and later evolved to be a WHO publication. Between 1968 and 1979, it provided data on the smallpox situation in each country, allowing frontline workers to appraise their own work and compare it with others. In 1981 it began to publish data on emerging information on AIDS.

The bulk of its content relates to vaccination, epidemic and pandemic preparedness and response and treatment, in addition to reports on neglected tropical diseases such as the most common infectious cause of blindness, trachoma. It includes professional reviews of selected infectious diseases. The Global Advisory Committee on Vaccine Safety (GACVS) publishes its findings in the WER. It is available electronically via the WHO's website and is free of charge.

== Aim ==
The WER aims to rapidly disseminate epidemiological information about outbreaks of diseases under the International Health Regulations and about communicable diseases of public health importance. This includes emerging or re-emerging diseases.

== History ==
The Weekly Epidemiological Record was first published by a group of epidemiologists based in the Health Office of the League of Nations, in Geneva, on 1 April 1926, 20 years before the constitution of the World Health Organization was signed at the International Health Conference in New York. At the time, the WER's mission was to provide the world with information about disease threats that mostly travelled via the sea route: cholera, plague, smallpox, typhus and yellow fever. The WER subsequently evolved into a WHO publication.

Until 1967, during efforts to eradicate smallpox, smallpox unit chief Donald Henderson noted that the array of data failed to provide a true picture of what was going on in different countries. He had himself been through and distributed more than 230 reports from mainly field staff, until it was suggested to him to publish the data where it could be shared in one place, in the WER, where it had a reach of some 5,000 people. Clear and concise data on the smallpox situation in each country subsequently appeared every three weeks in the WER between 1968 and 1979, during which time front line workers could appraise their own work and compare it with others.

Following reports of AIDS in the CDC's Morbidity and Mortality Weekly Report in June 1981, the WHO collected and published emerging information on the disease in the WER.

== Content ==
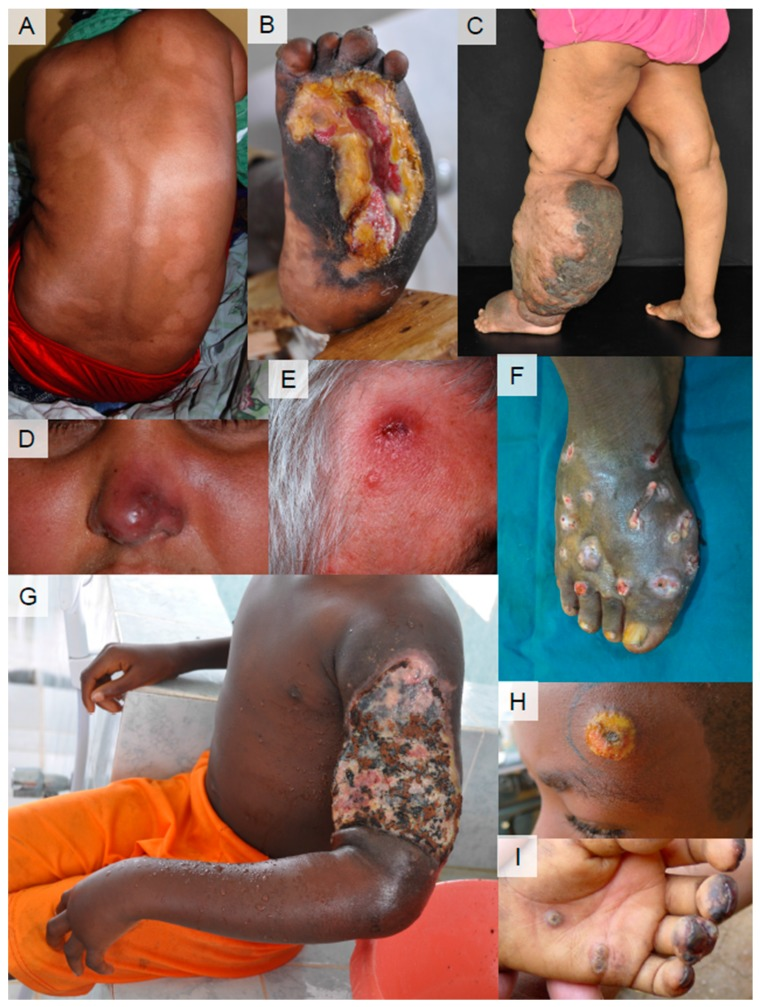
Skin NTDs: (A) & (B) Leprosy, (C) Lymphatic filariasis, (D) Mucocutaneous leishmaniasis, (E) Cutaneous leishmaniasis, (F) Mycetoma, (G) Buruli ulcer, (H) Primary Yaws (primary yaws), (I) Tungiasis.

The WER is published by the WHO in English and French with the alternative title of the Relevé épidémiologique hebdomadaire. The bulk of its content relates to vaccination, epidemic and pandemic preparedness and response and treatment. It includes professional reviews of selected infectious diseases and global, regional and country epidemic events.

Since 1998, the WER publishes the WHO policy relating to new vaccines. During the SARS outbreak in 2003, the WER reported epidemiological data on cases and by April 2003, more than 50% of the publication was dedicated to travel restrictions, reporting protocols and the transmission of SARS. In May 2012, the WER published the WHO SAGE's (Strategic Advisory Group of Experts on immunization) stance on the use of influenza vaccines, backed by an article which stated the WHO's update on including pregnant women as a priority. The Global Advisory Committee on Vaccine Safety (GACVS), that responds to vaccine safety issues, publishes its findings in the WER.

It reports on neglected tropical diseases (NTD) in a systematic way. These include schistosomiasis, lymphatic filariasis, onchocerciasis, helminthiasis and the most common infectious cause of blindness, trachoma, which the WER reported as posing a threat to 136.9 million people globally in July 2020, a drop from 1.5 billion in 2002 and a reduction of 91%.

As of 2020 the WER is in its 95th volume.

== Website and access ==
It is free of charge and available electronically via the WHO's website. Previously it was distributed by airmail and telex. It comes out on a Friday.
