= World Immunization Week 2022 =

Worldwide public health awareness week

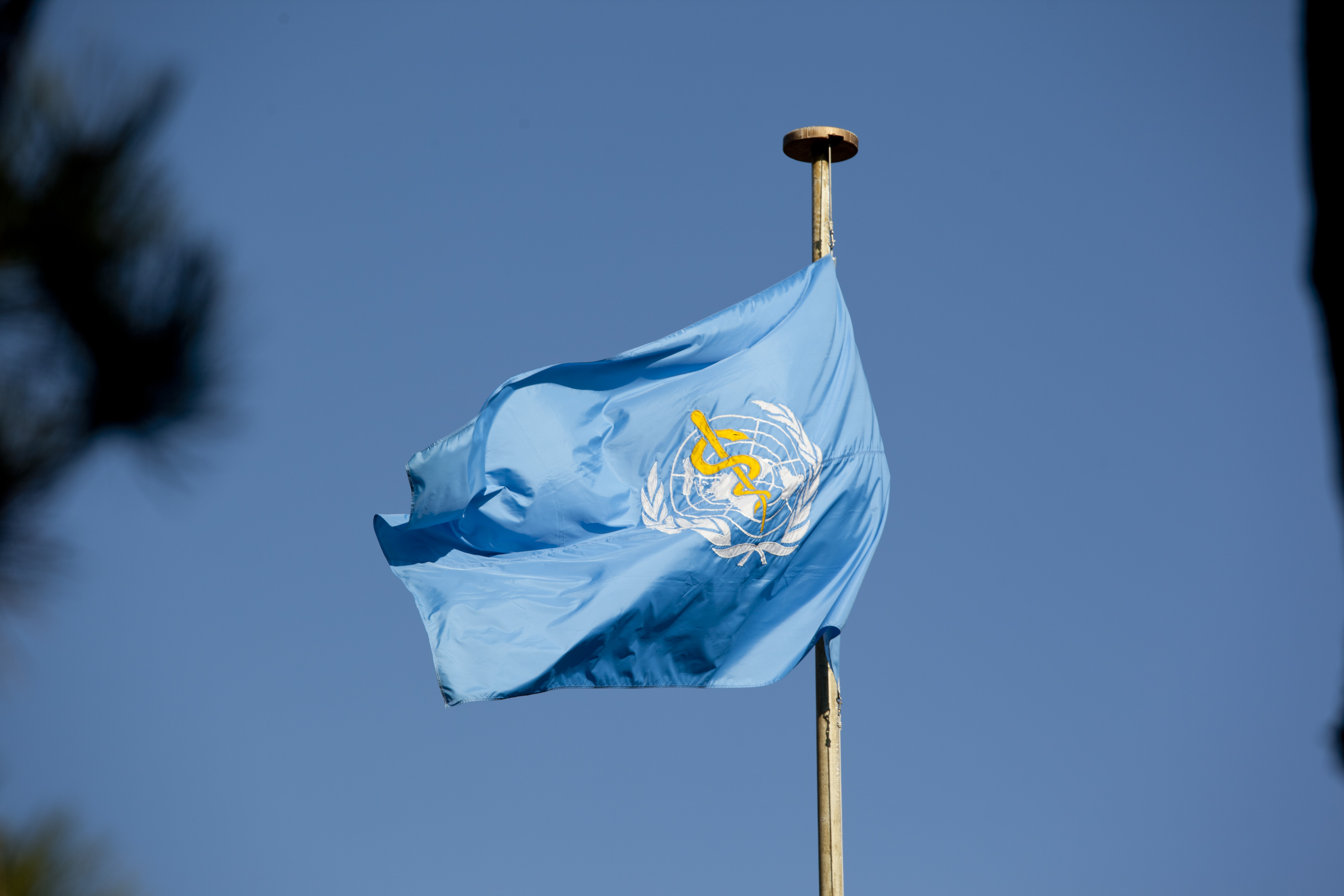
- Observed by: All member states of the World Health Organization
- Date: 24–30 April

The 2022 edition of the World Immunization Week was observed from 24 to 30 April 2022. The World Immunization Week is a global public health campaign for raising awareness for immunization against vaccine preventable diseases. The theme of this year's event is Long Life for All-in pursuit of a long life well lived. The official hashtags of the event are #Vaccines4Life and #LongLifeForAll. The organizations such as UNICEF, GAVI and Global Polio Eradication Initiative have partnered with the World Health Organization in the 2022 edition of World Immunization Week.

== Global activities ==
- The World Health Organization has released campaign material in six languages to promote the observation of the Immunization Week and to disseminate awareness regarding vaccination.
- The Federal Ministry of Health and Human Services of Somalia, in partnership with the World Health Organization and the United Nations Children's Fund jointly urged humanitarian partners and local agencies to boost immunization efforts in Somalia while marking the World Immunization Week.
- The Centers for Disease Control and Prevention of the USA is a partner for the World Immunization Week where they honor their public and community health workers who advance the goal of immunization.
- The Health Secretary of Philippines urged the citizens to get vaccinated as a part of observing the World Immunization Week.
