= Sebelius v. Cloer =

- Supreme Court of the United States

Decided May 20, 2013
- Full case name: Sebelius v. Cloer
- Citations: 569 U.S. 369 (more)

Holding
- An untimely National Childhood Vaccine Injury Act petition may qualify for an award of attorney’s fees if it is filed in good faith and there is a reasonable basis for its claim.

Court membership
- Chief Justice John Roberts Associate Justices Antonin Scalia · Anthony Kennedy; Clarence Thomas · Ruth Bader Ginsburg; Stephen Breyer · Samuel Alito; Sonia Sotomayor · Elena Kagan

Case opinion
- Majority: Sotomayor, joined by unanimous

Laws applied
- National Childhood Vaccine Injury Act

Sebelius v. Cloer, 569 U.S. 369 (2013), was a United States Supreme Court case in which the court held that an untimely National Childhood Vaccine Injury Act petition may qualify for an award of attorney's fees if it is filed in good faith and there is a reasonable basis for its claim.

== Background ==
The National Childhood Vaccine Injury Act of 1986 (NCVIA) established a no-fault compensation system to stabilize the vaccine market and expedite compensation to injured parties. Under the act, "[a] proceeding for compensation" is "initiated" by "service upon the Secretary" of Health and Human Services and "the filing of a petition containing" specified documentation with the clerk of the Court of Federal Claims, who then "immediately" forwards the petition for assignment to a special master. An attorney may not charge a fee for "services in connection with [such] a petition," but a court may award attorney's fees and costs "incurred [by a claimant] in any proceeding on" an unsuccessful "petition filed under section 300aa–11," if that petition "was brought in good faith and there was a reasonable basis for the claim for which the petition was brought."

In 1997, shortly after receiving her third Hepatitis B vaccine, Cloer began to experience symptoms that eventually led to a multiple sclerosis (MS) diagnosis in 2003. In 2004, she learned of a link between MS and the Hepatitis B vaccine, and in 2005, she filed a claim for compensation under the NCVIA, alleging that the vaccine caused or exacerbated her MS. After reviewing the petition and its supporting documentation, the Chief Special Master concluded that Cloer's claim was untimely because the Act's 36-month limitations period began to run when she had her first MS symptoms in 1997. The Federal Circuit ultimately agreed that Cloer's petition was untimely. Cloer then sought attorney's fees and costs (collectively, fees). The en banc Federal Circuit found that she was entitled to recover fees on her untimely petition.

== Opinion of the court ==
The Supreme Court issued an opinion on May 20, 2013.
