= National Childhood Vaccine Injury Act =

1986 United States legislation on health

National Childhood Vaccine Injury Act of 1986

United States Supreme Court cases
- Shalala v. Whitecotton, 514 U.S. 268 (1995); Bruesewitz v. Wyeth, 562 U.S. 223 (2011); Sebelius v. Cloer, 569 U.S. 369 (2013)

The National Childhood Vaccine Injury Act (NCVIA) of 1986 (42 U.S.C. §§ 300aa-1 to 300aa-34) was signed into law by United States president Ronald Reagan as part of a larger health bill on November 14, 1986. NCVIA's purpose was to eliminate the potential financial liability of vaccine manufacturers due to vaccine injury claims to ensure a stable market supply of vaccines, and to provide cost-effective arbitration for vaccine injury claims. Under the NCVIA, the National Vaccine Injury Compensation Program (NVICP) was created to provide a federal no-fault system for compensating vaccine-related injuries or death by establishing a claim procedure involving the United States Court of Federal Claims and special masters.

== Background ==
In the 1970s and 1980s, a controversy erupted related to the question of whether the whole-cell pertussis component of the DPT vaccine caused permanent brain injury known as pertussis vaccine encephalopathy in rare cases. No studies showed a causal connection, and later studies showed no connection of any type between the DPT vaccine and permanent brain injury. The alleged vaccine-induced brain damage proved to be an unrelated condition, infantile epilepsy. In 1990, an editorial in the Journal of the American Medical Association by a contractor of the vaccine manufacturers called the connection a "myth" and "nonsense". However, before that point, criticism of the studies showing no connection and a few well-publicized anecdotal reports of permanent disability that were blamed on the DPT vaccine gave rise to anti-DPT movements in the 1970s. In the United States, low profit margins and an increase in vaccine-related lawsuits led many manufacturers to stop producing the DPT vaccine by the early 1980s. By 1985, vaccine manufacturers had difficulty obtaining liability insurance. The price of the DPT vaccine skyrocketed as a result, leading providers to curtail purchases, thus limiting availability. Only one company was still manufacturing pertussis vaccine in the US by the end of 1985. Because of this, Congress passed the National Childhood Vaccine Injury Act (NCVIA) in 1986, establishing a federal no-fault system to compensate victims of injury caused by mandated vaccines.

== NCVIA provisions ==
=== Vaccine Adverse Event Reporting System ===
The NCVIA also mandates that all health care providers must report certain adverse events following vaccination to the Vaccine Adverse Event Reporting System (VAERS).

The NCVIA also established a committee from the Institute of Medicine (IOM) to review the existing literature on vaccine adverse events occurring after immunization.

=== National Vaccine Program Office ===
As a result of the NCVIA, the National Vaccine Program Office (NVPO) was established within the DHHS. The NVPO is responsible for coordinating immunization-related activities between all DHHS agencies, including the Centers for Disease Control and Prevention (CDC), Food and Drug Administration (FDA), National Institutes of Health (NIH) and the Health Resources and Services Administration (HRSA).

=== Vaccine Information Statements ===
The NCVIA requires that all health care providers who administer vaccines against diphtheria, tetanus, pertussis, polio, measles, mumps, rubella, hepatitis B, Haemophilus influenzae type b and varicella must provide a Vaccine Information Statement (VIS) to the vaccine recipient, their parent or legal guardian prior to each dose. A VIS must be given with every vaccination, including each dose in a multi-dose series. Each VIS contains a brief description of the disease, as well as the risks and benefits of the vaccine. Each VIS is developed by the CDC and distributed to state and local health departments as well as individual providers.

== Place in vaccine misinformation ==
The law is brought up in arguments made by anti-vaccine activists. It has been faulted by those claiming that it has resulted in the end of civil liability for vaccines, in spite of its creation of the NVICP as an alternative avenue for compensation. The NVICP, with its burden of proof being more lenient than scientific standards of proof, has still resulted in a low award rate.
