= Vaccination in India =

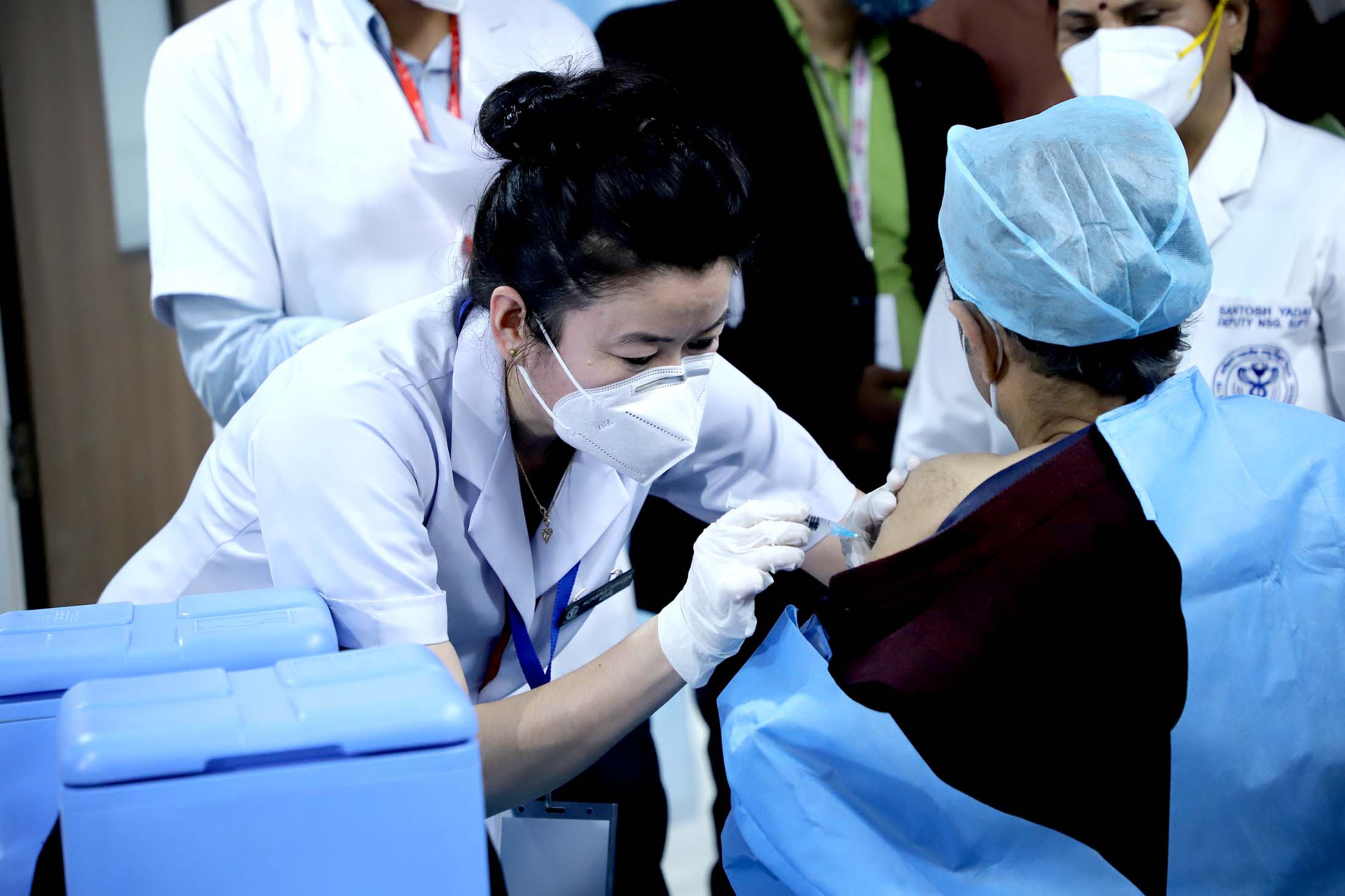
COVID-19 vaccination roll out in AIIMS, New Delhi, India on 16 January 2021

Vaccination in India includes the use of vaccines in Indian public health and the place of vaccines in Indian society, policy, and research.

== Vaccination policy ==
India's Universal Immunization Programme (UIP) began in 1985. The UIP covers:

- BCG vaccine for Tuberculosis
- DPT vaccine for Diphtheria, Pertussis and Tetanus
- OPV vaccine for Poliomyelitis
- Measles vaccine/ Measles and Rubella vaccine
- Hepatitis B vaccine
- TT vaccine
- Pentavalent vaccine for Hib, DPT, Hep B
- JE vaccine (localised)
- Rotavirus vaccine
- PCV for Streptococcus pneumoniae

== Available vaccines ==
=== Coronavirus ===
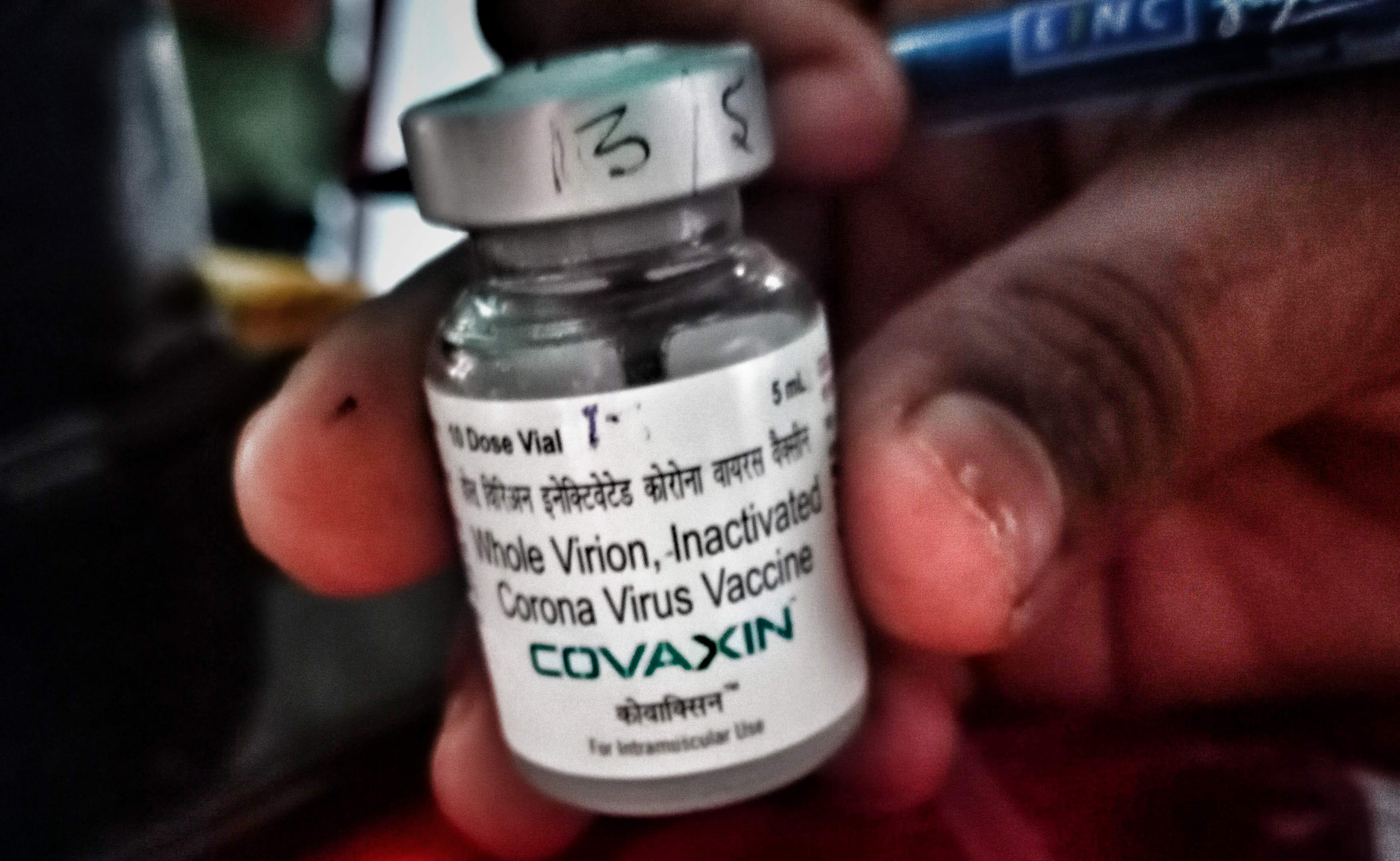
A 5ml vial of Covaxin BBV152

India has been vaccinating against coronavirus since 16 January 2021.

=== Rotavirus ===
India's implementation of the rotavirus vaccine in its Universal Immunisation Programme has saved many children's lives.

Nearly every child in every country globally experiences at least one rotavirus infection in early childhood. However, in India, children are more likely to get this infection multiple times as well as more likely to die from it.

A rotavirus vaccine is available. This vaccine is highly effective and has prevented approximately 50% of severe rotavirus diarrhea cases in India. Scientists in India produce vaccines for this disease which are special for India only.

=== HPV ===
As of 2019 the Indian government is scaling up efforts to promote the HPV vaccine for girls to prevent cervical cancer. This effort began in 2008 with the introduction of one sort of vaccine and in 2018 the government began providing a newer version of the vaccine.

=== Respiratory syncytial virus ===
Cases of respiratory syncytial virus (RSV) in India mainly occur in North India in the winter. This virus causes lower respiratory tract infection.

== Safety ==
India, like many other countries, uses the World Health Organization system for reporting and classifying "Adverse Events following Immunization". The government agency which manages this program is responsible for both increasing safety and giving an explanation if a problem occurs. Between 2012 and 2016, the system identified about 1,000 "adverse event" cases. Researchers responded by examining these cases to improve safety.

== History ==
In 1802 a 3-year-old girl in Mumbai received a smallpox vaccine, making her the first person to take a vaccine in India. The British government claimed success and began to block use of the previous technology variolation to only recommend vaccination instead. In hindsight, the situation was complicated because vaccines were the long-term solution but way that the British Raj introduced them was disruptive to how people accessed traditional health services, and to government operations, and in religion.

== Society and culture ==
The pharmaceutical industry in India is strong and has a reputation for producing good vaccines for sale and export. Typically when a country makes vaccines, that means that local people have good access to them. For various reasons, India has both a strong vaccine manufacturing sector and also people in India, especially children, have higher rates of missing vaccines than in comparable countries.

Various commentators have given different reasons for why India has less vaccination. One historic reason is that India has contributed intensely to encouraging vaccines for smallpox and polio at the expense of being able to promote other vaccines. Another explanation could be that the Indian government underspends on vaccines in general. Somehow India's population does not demand vaccines, which could be a result of lack of public health education. India also has pseudoscience activists promoting vaccine hesitancy.

Some research has suggested that community engagement (CE) may be especially important to consider in supporting vaccination in India. This may include "[efforts that are] focused on upstream relationships (bidirectional), fostering trust, transparent communication, capacity building, and political will to ensure such approaches." There appears to be overarching support for vaccination CE among decisionmakers in India, but there remain many structural and social barriers to moving forward on this front.

== Vaccines in research ==
=== Dengue ===
There has been a dengue vaccine available since 2015. However, this vaccine is not effective in many cases. The Indian government participates in the global research to develop an effective general use dengue vaccine.

=== Kala azar ===
There is research for a kala azar (Leishmaniasis) vaccine in India, but none exists.

== Special populations ==
Foreign tourists visiting India contribute significantly to India's economy. People who visit India from countries with different diseases may not have vaccines to protect against infections in India. When tourists do get an infection in India, often that infection could have been prevented with a vaccine.

The World Health Organization recommends different vaccines for tourists in different circumstances. Those vaccines include diphtheria vaccine, tetanus vaccine, hepatitis A vaccine, hepatitis B vaccine, oral polio vaccine, typhoid vaccine, varicella vaccine, Japanese encephalitis, meningococcal vaccine, rabies vaccine, and yellow fever vaccine.
