= Immunization Action Coalition =

Organization providing vaccination information

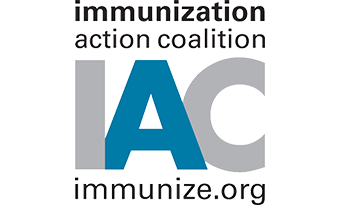
- Formation: 1994
- Type: NGO
- Legal status: Non-profit
- Purpose: Distribution of information about vaccines and the diseases they prevent
- Headquarters: Saint Paul, Minnesota
- Region served: United States
- Website: immunize.org

The Immunization Action Coalition (IAC) is an organization that distributes information about vaccines and the diseases they prevent. In partnership with the Centers for Disease Control and Prevention (CDC), their headquarters is located in Saint Paul, Minnesota, with member coalitions in the United States and Canada. Paul Offit serves on the Advisory board.

== Mission ==
Having the goal of providing the public with information about immunization, the IAC has three current functions:

1. creation and distribution of weekly editions of IAC Express to IAC's email subscribers;
2. publication of the feature "Ask the Experts," in which CDC and IAC immunization experts answer questions from vaccine providers; and
3. creation of new immunization education materials designed to respond to the needs of immunization providers, parents, and patients.

== Activities ==
The coalition's Web site offers "Unprotected People Stories" about the consequences of vaccine avoidance, and "Talking about Vaccines" which discusses general vaccine-related topics. In addition, the coalition gives information on vaccines through social networking and other popular sources of information, such as the "Dear Abby" newspaper columns and letters to the editor. In 2012, the coalition launched a campaign to promote the fourth edition of The Vaccine Handbook: A Practical Guide for Clinicians. The World Health Organization lists the IAC on their Global Vaccine Safety page, noting the availability of their materials in various languages such as Korean, Vietnamese, and Turkish. They promote Hepatitis B vaccination programs for children ranging in age from 0–18 years of age. The IAC is also a member of the WHO-led project Vaccine Safety Net.

== See also ==
- Health promotion
- Herd immunity
- Northern Rivers Vaccination Supporters
- Vaccination policy in the United States
- World Immunization Week
