= Universal Immunisation Programme =

Vaccination program by the Government of India

Universal Immunisation Programme (UIP) is a vaccination programme launched by the Government of India in 1985. It became a part of Child Survival and Safe Motherhood Programme in 1992 and has remained one of the key areas under the National Health Mission since 2005. The programme now consists of vaccination against 12 diseases- tuberculosis, diphtheria, pertussis (whooping cough), tetanus, poliomyelitis, measles, hepatitis B, rotaviral gastroenteritis, Japanese encephalitis, rubella, pneumonia (haemophilus influenzae type B) and Pneumococcal diseases (pneumococcal pneumonia and meningitis). Hepatitis B and Pneumococcal diseases were added to the UIP in 2007 and 2017 respectively. The cost of all the vaccines are borne entirely by the Government of India and is funded through taxes with a budget of ₹7,234 crore (US$750 million) in 2022 and the program covers all residents of India, including foreign residents.

The other additions in UIP through the way are inactivated polio vaccine (IPV), rotavirus vaccine (RVV), Measles-Rubella vaccine (MR). Four new vaccines have been introduced into the country's Universal Immunisation Programme (UIP), including injectable polio vaccine, an adult vaccine against Japanese Encephalitis and Pneumococcal Conjugate Vaccine.

== Background ==
Vaccines against rotavirus, rubella and polio (injectable) will help the country meet its Millennium Development Goals 4 targets that include reducing child mortality by two-thirds by 2015, besides meeting meet global polio eradication targets. An adult vaccine against Japanese encephalitis was also introduced in districts with high levels of the disease. The recommendations to introduce these new vaccines have been made after numerous scientific studies and comprehensive deliberations by the National Technical Advisory Group of India (NTAGI), the country's apex scientific advisory body on immunisation.

Vaccine benefits are debated with some urging caution in the choice of vaccines introduced while expanding the immunisation programme, despite overwhelming and widespread documented scientific evidence on the efficacy of vaccines.

With these new vaccines, India's UIP will now provide universal and free vaccines against 13 life-threatening diseases, to 27 million children annually. Calling it one of the most significant health policies in the last 30 years, the note pointed out that the latest decision along with the recently introduced pentavalent vaccine, will help prevent death in about one lakh infants and adults in the working age group, besides putting a stop to about 10 lakh hospitalizations each year.

"The introduction of four new lifesaving vaccines, will play a key role in reducing the childhood and infant mortality and morbidity in the country. Many of these vaccines are already available through private practitioners to those who can afford them. The government will now ensure that the benefits of vaccination reach all sections of the society, regardless of social and economic status," the PM said.

From February 2017, Union ministry of health and family welfare has rolled out Measles-Rubella vaccine from UIP.

== See also ==
- Vaccine-preventable diseases
- World Immunization Week
