= Shalala v. Whitecotton =

- Supreme Court of the United States

Argued February 28, 1995 Decided April 18, 1995
- Full case name: Donna E. Shalala, Secretary of Health and Human Services, Petitioner v. Margaret Whitecotton et al.
- Docket no.: 94-372
- Citations: 514 U.S. 268 (more) 115 S. Ct. 1477; 131 L. Ed. 2d 374

Case history
- Prior: Whitecotton v. Secretary of Health & Human Services, 17 F.3d 374 (Fed. Cir. 1994)
- Subsequent: Whitecotton v. Secretary of Health & Human Services, 81 F.3d 1099 (Fed. Cir. 1996)

Holding
- A claimant relying on the Vaccine Injury Table to establish the onset of a listed injury must show that the first symptom or manifestation of the injury occurred after vaccination and within the period specified by the Table. A symptom occurring during the Table period is insufficient where the same injury had already manifested before vaccination.

Court membership
- Chief Justice William Rehnquist Associate Justices John P. Stevens · Sandra Day O'Connor; Antonin Scalia · Anthony Kennedy; David Souter · Clarence Thomas; Ruth Bader Ginsburg · Stephen Breyer

Case opinions
- Majority: Souter, joined by Rehnquist, Stevens, O'Connor, Scalia, Kennedy, Thomas, Ginsburg, Breyer
- Concurrence: O'Connor, joined by Breyer

Laws applied
- National Childhood Vaccine Injury Act

Shalala v. Whitecotton, 514 U.S. 268 (1995), was a decision of the United States Supreme Court unanimously holding that a petitioner seeking compensation for an alleged vaccine injury through the National Vaccine Injury Compensation Program (NVICP), as a component of the National Childhood Vaccine Injury Act, must demonstrate the absence of the injury prior to vaccination.

This was the first case under which the Supreme Court examined the NVICP, and the case subsequently became important to the law governing claims for significant aggravation of preexisting conditions under the Vaccine Act. On remand, the United States Court of Appeals for the Federal Circuit developed a four-part test for determining whether a petitioner has established a Table claim based on significant aggravation. Legal scholar Peter H. Meyers has described that decision as the leading case explaining the criteria for significant aggravation under the program.

== Background ==
The U.S. Department of Health and Human Services (DHS) set up the NVICP in 1988 to compensate individuals and families of individuals injured by covered childhood vaccines. The program's no-fault compensation system was intended to provide an alternative to conventional tort litigation for people injured by covered vaccines, enabling a claimant to establish entitlement to compensation either by proving actual causation, or by satisfying the requirements of the Vaccine Injury Table (VIT).

The VIT associates specified vaccines with particular injuries and periods of time during which the first symptom or manifestation of those injuries must occur. When a claimant establishes the injury and timing set forth in the VIT, the statute provides a rebuttable presumption of causation, relieving the claimant of the burden of affirmatively proving that the vaccine caused the injury. The Secretary of Health and Human Services may rebut the presumption by showing that the injury resulted from "factors unrelated" to vaccination. Under the Act, a claimant who does not attempt to prove actual causation must make out a prima facie case by showing that "the first symptom or manifestation of the onset ... of any ... [listed] condition ... occurred within the time period after vaccine administration set forth in the Vaccine Injury Table". The VIT specifies a 3-day period for encephalopathy following a DPT vaccination.

== Facts ==
Margaret Whitecotton and her parents, filed a claim for compensation alleging that Margaret had suffered encephalopathy as a result of her vaccination against diphtheria, pertussis, and tetanus (DPT). The Special Master ruled that Margaret had failed to make out a prima facie case, finding, among other things, that by the time she received her vaccination she was already "clearly microcephalic", that this condition evidenced pre-existing encephalopathy. The Special Master therefore found that "the first symptom or manifestation" of her condition's onset had occurred before her vaccination and the 3-day table period. The United States Court of Federal Claims, which reviews Special Master decisions, affirmed, but the United States Court of Appeals for the Federal Circuit reversed, holding, among other things, that a claimant satisfies the table requirements whenever she shows that any symptom or manifestation of a listed condition occurred within the table time period, even if there was evidence of the condition before the vaccination. DHS then appealed the ruling of the Federal Circuit, and the Supreme Court granted certiorari.

== Supreme Court decision ==
Justice David Souter delivered the opinion for a unanimous Court, reversing the Federal Circuit. The Court relied principally on the words "first" and "onset" appearing in the statute, concluding that where a symptom or manifestation of a Table injury existed before vaccination, a later symptom could not constitute the first manifestation of the onset of that same injury. Consequently, evidence that a claimant experienced a symptom during the Table period was necessary, but not by itself sufficient, for an onset claim, for which the petitioner also had to show that the injury had not already manifested before vaccination. The Court rejected the Federal Circuit's reliance on other portions of the Vaccine Act that appeared to distinguish preexisting conditions from post-vaccination injuries, finding that those provisions did not override the explicit requirement that the "first symptom or manifestation of the onset" occur within the period established by the Table.

The Court expressly declined to decide whether Margaret actually had a preexisting encephalopathy, nor did it decide whether the vaccination had significantly aggravated a preexisting condition or whether the special master had applied the correct legal test to such an aggravation claim, leaving those issues open to examination on remand. Justice Sandra Day O'Connor wrote a concurring opinion, joined by Justice Stephen Breyer, emphasizing that the Federal Circuit's interpretation would deprive the statute's separate provision for "significant aggravation" of much of its function.

Pediatric hematologist Derry Ridgway, in a 1999 study of contested claims decided during the first eight years of the Vaccine Injury Compensation Program, examined Whitecotton as one of the most important appellate decisions concerning Table injuries and causation, and characterized Souter's reasoning as treating the petitioner's microcephaly and seizures as manifestations of a single disorder for which one manifestation appearing before vaccination prevented later seizures from establishing the onset of the encephalopathy. He compared Whitecotton with an earlier Federal Circuit decision, Koston v. Secretary of Health and Human Services, in which a claimant with the disorder Rett syndrome present from birth received compensation for seizures beginning shortly after DPT vaccination, and observed that the preexisting disorder in Koston resembled the preexisting microcephaly in Whitecotton, suggesting that the Supreme Court's reasoning in Whitecotton might have produced a different result in the earlier case.
