= Renee Jenkins =

American pediatrician (born 1947)

Renee Rosalind Jenkins (born 1947) is an American pediatrician known for her work in adolescent medicine. She is the first African-American president of the American Academy of Pediatrics and the Society of Adolescent Medicine.

== Early life and education ==
Born in Philadelphia and raised in Philadelphia and Detroit, Jenkins was educated at Wayne State University, where she earned her bachelor's degree (1967) and doctorate (1971). She was a resident at Albert Einstein College of Medicine in pediatrics, and a fellow there in adolescent medicine. She graduated residency in 1975 but completed another fellowship in population dynamics at Johns Hopkins University in 1986.

== Career ==
Jenkins began her career at Howard University, teaching in the department of pediatrics and its first director of Adolescent Services. From 1994-2007, she chaired the pediatrics department at Howard. She has served in several professional organizations, including the American Academy of Pediatrics and Society of Adolescent Medicine, and she has written for Nelson's Textbook of Pediatrics. Jenkins is, as of 2016, a professor at both Howard and George Washington University. Her research focuses on prevention of adolescent pregnancy, adolescent reproductive health, and medical issues facing minority children in the United States.

== Honors and awards ==
- Fellow, American Academy of Pediatrics (1977)
- President, Society of Adolescent Medicine (1989)
- Member, Alpha Omega Alpha (1991)
- Grace James Award for Distinguished Service, National Medical Association (1999)
- Member, National Academy of Medicine (2001)
- President, American Academy of Pediatrics (2007)
- Pediatric Section Chair, National Medical Association
- Member, American Pediatric Society
- Member, Ambulatory Pediatric Association
- Chair, Guttmacher Institute
