= Global Advisory Committee on Vaccine Safety =

- Abbreviation: GACVS
- Formation: 1999
- Purpose: "To respond promptly, efficiently, and with scientific rigour to vaccine safety issues of potential global importance."
- Headquarters: Geneva, Switzerland
- Members: 15 experts
- Chair: Dr Rita Helfand
- Vice-Chair: Professor Dure Samin Akram
- Parent organization: World Health Organization
- Website: Official website

The Global Advisory Committee on Vaccine Safety (GACVS) is a group of experts that provides independent and authoritative guidance to the World Health Organization (WHO) on the topic of safe vaccine use.

To maintain its independence, GACVS members may not represent WHO in any way. The Committee was established by the WHO in 1999, and as part of its responsibilities, oversees the Vaccine Safety Net. The group meets twice yearly and publishes its findings in the WHO Weekly Epidemiological Record.

Engagements and topics undertaken by the GACVS have included the safety of vaccines for measles, influenza, human papilloma virus, Japanese encephalitis, rotavirus and hepatitis B. In May 2020, as part the WHO's aim to coordinate global research on tests, treatments and vaccines against the SARS-CoV-2, the GACVS addressed the issue of rapidly developing COVID-19 vaccines during a global emergency and growing misinformation and vaccine hesitancy.

== Purpose ==
The purpose of the GACVS is to provide a ready group of independent experts that can advise the WHO on issues relating to vaccine safety, enabling the WHO to respond quickly and authoritatively with potential global importance. As part of its responsibilities, GACVS oversees the Vaccine Safety Net.

== History and function ==
WHO established the GACVS in 1999 on a background of advances and increasing knowledge of vaccines accompanied by concerns relating to their safety and subsequent influence on public confidence in vaccine programmes. Its membership consists of a number of experts in several fields that touch on the topic of vaccine safety, including epidemiology, vaccinology, ethics, neurology, internal medicine, and autoimmunity. It is an advisory body that provides the WHO with scientifically backed "advice on vaccine safety issues of potential global importance", makes recommendations for policy-making and bringing together ad hoc task forces, and prioritizes aspects of checking vaccine safety.

An example of an issue, on which the Committee might be called to provide guidance, is the matter of short- and long-term national vaccination programmes. According to its 2017 terms of reference, the Committee:

- cascades its findings by various means.
- creates task forces as required and when needed
- identifies causal relationships
- makes recommendations to the WHO
- reviews up-to-date knowledge around vaccine safety,

Members are nominated by the Director of WHO's Department of Essential Medicines and Health Products, and are appointed for an initial term of three years. Current members can only be renewed for one additional term.

To maintain independence in advising, it reports that its members may not represent WHO "in any capacity or in any forum." Current and former members of the GACVS can be found on the official website. The group meets twice yearly and publishes its findings in the WHO Weekly Epidemiological Record.

Engagements and topics undertaken by the GACVS include the safety of immunization during pregnancy. The GACVS is also aware of its increasing responsibility towards low- and middle-income countries that make vaccines for export.

=== Vaccine hesitancy ===
The GACVS aims to respond quickly and authoritatively in addressing vaccine-related adverse effects, thereby maintaining confidence in vaccines and immunization coverage with the result that the incidence of disease falls. The GACVS evaluates and interprets reports of adverse effects of vaccines that impact on international vaccination programmes, helping to develop better surveillance systems, particularly in low- and middle-income countries. It also monitors the clinical testing of new vaccines and their use in immunization programs.

The GACVS has been involved in issues relating to vaccine hesitancy regarding several vaccines including vaccines for measles, influenza, human papilloma virus, Japanese encephalitis, rotavirus and hepatitis B.

=== COVID-19 ===
In May 2020, during the global emergency of COVID-19 and as part of the WHO's aim to coordinate global research on tests, treatments and vaccines against the coronavirus responsible for COVID-19 disease, the GACVS addressed the issue of monitoring fast-emerging COVID-19 vaccines amid a global emergency and growing misinformation and vaccine hesitancy.

A COVID-19 vaccine safety surveillance manual was published by the WHO in 2020, upon recommendation and guidance of GACVS members.

== Evaluation ==
Upon the 15-year anniversary of the GACVS, a number of members reviewed the Committee's contributions and ongoing challenges.

== External links section ==
- Global Advisory Committee on Vaccine Safety. World Health Organization.
