= National Vaccine Program Office =

Health department in the United States

The National Vaccine Program Office (NVPO) is an office of the United States Department of Health and Human Services that plays a role in the coordination of vaccine policy. It was established by the National Childhood Vaccine Injury Act. On October 24, 2020, the New York Times asserted that the Trump administration essentially eliminated the role of the program when it closed the office in 2019.

NVPO's former Chair, Daniel Salmon, went on to direct the Institute for Vaccine Safety at the Johns Hopkins Bloomberg School of Public Health.
