= Maternal mortality in India =

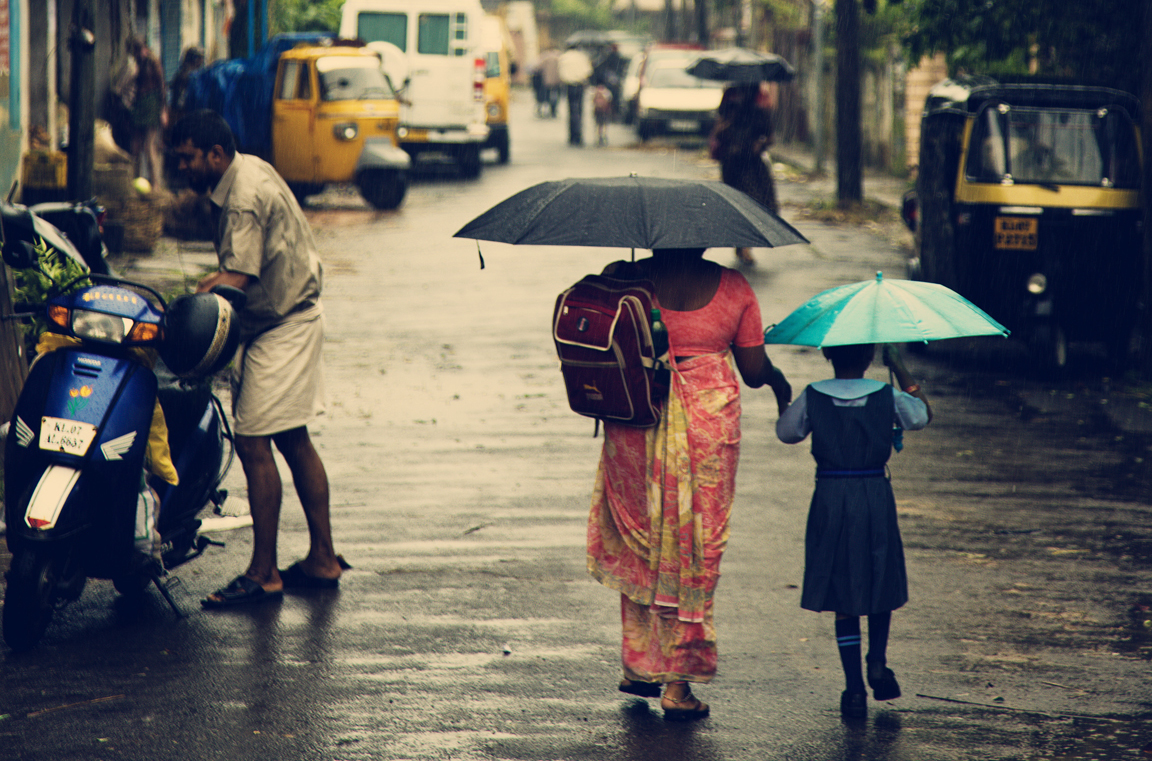
Good health for the mother is good for family and society

Maternal mortality in India is the maternal death of a woman in India during pregnancy or after pregnancy, including post-abortion or post-birth periods. Different countries and cultures have different rates and causes for maternal death. Within India, there is a marked variation in healthcare access between regions and in socioeconomic factors, accordingly, there is also variation in maternal deaths for various states, regions, and demographics of women.

Pregnancy involves a vulnerability that puts women at risk of dying, and India is one of many countries which records a high number of pregnancy-related deaths of women each year.

Women die as a result of complications during and following pregnancy and childbirth or abortion. Most of these complications develop during pregnancy are easily preventable or treatable. Other complications may exist before pregnancy but are worsened during pregnancy, especially if not managed as part of a woman's care.

== History ==
India contributes one-fifth of the global burden of absolute maternal deaths; however, it has experienced an estimated 4.7% annual decline in maternal mortality ratio (MMR), and 3.5% annual increase in skilled birth attendance since 1990.

Ninety-four percent (94%) of all maternal deaths occur in low and lower middle-income countries. In September 2000, the United Nations, faced with the enormous maternal death toll in India and other developing countries, pledged as its fifth Millennium Development Goal (MDG 5) that the global MMR would be reduced to a quarter of its 1990 level by 2015. India is a signatory to the Millennium Declaration adopted at the United Nations General Assembly in September 2000, and consistently reaffirmed its commitment towards the eight development goals. These MDG targets were in convergence with India's own national development goals to reduce poverty and other areas of deprivation. In 2018 the World Health Organization (WHO) congratulated India for the great reduction in its maternal mortality since 2005, especially in recent years, reducing the maternal mortality ratio (MMR) by 77%, from 556 per 100 000 live births in 1990 to 130 per 100 000 live births in 2016, which was considered by WHO to be a remarkable feat in contrast with the global maternal mortality reported to have experienced a decline of 43%. Prior to that, various reports described high rates of maternal mortality in India, from which WHO and other international bodies concluded India could not reach the Millennium Development Goals (MDG).

Infographic - History of Maternal Mortality in India

Maternal deaths being a rare event require a large sample size to provide robust estimates. In order to enhance the Sample Registration System (SRS) sample size, results were derived by following the practice of pooling three years' data to yield reliable estimates of maternal mortality. The first report on maternal mortality in India (1997-2003), describing trends, causes and risk factors, was released in October 2006.

In 2005, a woman's lifetime risk of maternal death in India was estimated to be 1 in 70. Similarly, the maternal mortality ratio (MMR; number of maternal deaths per 100,000 live births) in India was 450.
In 2010, approximately one-quarter of all pregnancy- and delivery-related maternal deaths worldwide occurred in India. Statistics showed that up until 2010, more than half a million women—most of them living in developing countries—died from pregnancy- or childbirth-related complications every year, and about a quarter of these "maternal" deaths occurred in India.

India showed a steady decline in maternal mortality, from 254 in every 100 000 live births in 2004-06 to 178 in every 100 000 live births in 2010-12.

As per the Sample Registration System (SRS), 2011-13 reports published by the Registrar General of India, the Maternal Mortality Ratio (MMR) was 167 per 1,00,000 live births in the country. Under Millennium Development Goal (MDG) 5, the target is to reduce Maternal Mortality Ratio (MMR) by three quarters between 1990 and 2015. This translates to reducing the MMR from 560 in 1990 to 140 in 2015.

In 2014, India was recognized to have contributed one-fifth of the global burden of absolute maternal deaths, while experiencing an estimated 4.7% decline in its Maternal Mortality Ratio which stood at 174 per 100,000 live births in India.

According to the Office of the Registrar General, the ratio has declined from 130 in 2014-2016 to 122 in 2015-17, registering a 6.15 per cent reduction since the last survey figures of 2014-2016. India's present MMR is below the Millennium Development Goal (MDG) target and puts the country on track to achieve the Sustainable Development Goal (SDG) target of an MMR below 70 by 2030.

== By medical condition ==
From 1980-2015 eclampsia was the cause of 1.5% of maternal deaths in India. Over this period, the number of women who experience this disease was the same, but there was also a slight reduction in the number of maternal deaths from the condition.

== Causes ==
Approximately two-thirds of all maternal deaths are primarily caused by major complications, including severe bleeding (typically occurring after childbirth), infections (commonly arising after childbirth), high blood pressure during pregnancy (pre-eclampsia and eclampsia), delivery-related complications, and unsafe abortions. Between 50% and 98% of maternal deaths result from direct obstetric causes such as hemorrhage, infection, hypertensive disorders, ruptured uterus, hepatitis, and anemia. Additionally, around 50% of maternal deaths caused by sepsis are associated with illegal induced abortions.

== Prevalence ==
According to the Sample Registration System Bulletin-2016, India has registered a 26.9 per cent reduction in maternal mortality ratio (MMR) since 2013. The MMR has declined from 167 in 2011-2013 to 130 in 2014-2016, to 122 in 2015-17, to 113 in 2016-2018. According to the National Health Policy (NHP) 2017, India set a goal to reduce its Maternal Mortality Rate (MMR) to below 100 per lakh live births by the year 2020. The SRS estimates India had an MMR of 97 per lakh live births during the period of 2018-2020, accomplishing this target within the specified timeframe.

MMR (per 100,000 live births)	2004-06	2007-09	2010-12	2011-13	2014-16	2015-17	2016-18	2018-20	2020-22	2022-24
India Total	254	212	178	167	130	122	113	97	88	87
Assam	480	390	328	300	237	229	215	195	125	84
Bihar	312	261	219	208	165	165	149	118	91	96
Jharkhand	312	261	219	208	165	76	71	56	50	82
Madhya Pradesh	335	269	230	221	173	188	173	173	159	135
Chhattisgarh	335	269	230	221	173	141	159	137	141	124
Odisha	303	258	235	222	180	168	150	119	136	124
Rajasthan	388	318	255	244	199	186	164	113	87	87
Uttar Pradesh	440	359	292	285	201	216	197	167	141	154
Uttarakhand	440	359	292	285	201	89	99	103	104	99
EAG & Assam Subtotal	375	308	257	246	188	175	161	137	120	116
Andhra Pradesh	154	134	110	92	74	74	65	45	47	39
Telangana	154	134	110	92	81	76	63	43	50	48
Karnataka	213	178	144	133	108	97	92	69	58	73
Kerala	95	81	66	61	46	42	43	19	18	24
Tamil Nadu	111	97	90	79	66	63	60	54	38	25
South Subtotal	149	127	105	93	77	72	67	49	42	41
Gujarat	160	148	122	112	91	87	75	57	55	64
Haryana	186	153	146	127	101	98	91	110	89	94
Maharashtra	130	104	87	68	61	55	46	33	36	37
Punjab	192	172	155	141	122	122	129	105	92	77
West Bengal	141	145	117	113	101	94	98	103	105	94
Other States	206	160	136	126	97	96	85	77	81	84
Other Subtotal	174	149	127	115	93	90	83	76	75	75

The RBI categorizes states usually into three groups, especially at the regional level, to understand the maternal mortality situation in the country better and to map the changes that have taken place: EAG, southern states and "other" states.

EAG states comprise Bihar, Jharkhand, Madhya Pradesh, Chhattisgarh, Odisha, Rajasthan, Uttar Pradesh, Uttarakhand, and Assam. The southern states are Andhra Pradesh, Telangana, Karnataka, Kerala and Tamil Nadu and the "other" states category covers the remaining states and Union territories.

Kerala, Maharashtra and Tamil Nadu have already met the sustainable development goals target of 70 per 100,000 MMR, while Andhra Pradesh and Telangana are within range.

Among southern states, the decline in MMR has been from 77 to 72 per 100,000 live births, from 93 to 90 in the other states. The decline was most significant in empowered action group (EAG) states and Assam from 188 to 175.

In the recently released report on maternal mortality ratio (MMR) prepared by the union government, Uttarakhand has fared significantly well recording 89 deaths per lakh deliveries between 2015 and 2017 as against the national average of 122.

According to officials of National Health Mission (NHM) in Uttarakhand, the state stood at 8th spot among the 19 top states in the country. Notably the last survey, which clubbed Uttarakhand and the neighboring Uttar Pradesh as one, ranked the two states at the 15th spot. It stated that the MMR in the two states (combined) between 2014 and 2016 stood at 201 maternal deaths per lakh births.

The rates for using maternal healthcare is the same for rural and urban women in wealthier Indian states. In poorer states, urban women access healthcare much more often than rural women.

=== Healthcare availability and use by region ===
In November 2016, the government launched the Pradhan Mantri Surakshit Matritva Abhiyan, or the Prime Minister Safe Pregnancy Scheme, which aims to provide free and comprehensive care on the ninth day of every month during pregnancy. Pregnant women are provided special, free ante-natal checks in their second or third trimester at government health care facilities, including ultrasounds, blood and urine tests.

Full ANC refers to at least four antenatal visits, one tetanus toxoid (TT) injection and iron folic acid tablets or syrup taken for 100 or more days. Yet, getting these facilities to women is a challenge, especially in poorer states. No more than 3.3 per cent of pregnant women in Bihar reported receiving full antenatal care, lowest among states.

The rates for using maternal healthcare is the same for rural and urban women in wealthier Indian states. In poorer states, urban women access healthcare much more often than rural women.

The BIMARU states experience a range of problems including maternal mortality.

==== Assam ====
Assam has the highest rate of maternal mortality in India. Within Assam, some of the highest rates of maternal mortality are among tea plantation workers.

==== Andhra Pradesh ====
A regional program in Andhra Pradesh seeks to ask doctors and nurses about the causes of maternal mortality in local communities. The general circumstance is that maternal mortality has different causes in different places, but if clinics knew the common causes for that area, then they would be better prepared to prevent future deaths.

==== Bihar ====
As compared to other states, Bihar has relatively low rates for use of medical care services.

==== West Bengal ====
A 2019 survey in rural West Bengal reported that the "three delays" caused maternal death. Those are delay in deciding to go to the clinic, delay in actually arriving at the clinic, and delay in getting care at the clinic.

==== Karnataka ====
Karnataka has the highest rate of maternal mortality in South India. In interviews, mothers reported that when they did not use healthcare services, their reasons included lack of access to transport to the clinic, the cost of care, and low value in a clinic visit. When a mother dies in this region it is often in the postpartum period.

==== Uttar Pradesh ====
Surveys have found women in UP who are more educated and have more money tend to use more maternal health services.

== Prevention ==
In India, among other factors, coordination between levels in the delivery system and fragmentation of care account for the poor quality of maternal health care, which is worsened by mass illiteracy. Most maternal deaths are preventable, as the health-care solutions to prevent or manage complications are well known. All women need access to high quality care in pregnancy, and during and after childbirth.

Various civil organizations have suggested effective strategies for reducing MMR in India:

- place a high priority on maternal and child health (MCH) services and integrate vertical programs (e.g., family planning) related to MCH;
- give attention to care during labor and delivery, the most critical period for complications;
- provide community-based delivery huts which can provide a clean and safe delivery place close to home, and maternity waiting rooms in hospitals for high risk mothers;
- improve the quality of MCH care at the rural community level (proper history taking, palpation, blood pressure and fetal heart screening, risk factor screening, and referral);
- improve quality of care at the primary health care level (emergency care and proper referral);
- include in the postpartum program MCH and family planning services;
- examine the feasibility of a national blood transfusion service network;
- educate young girls on health and sex and informally educate the masses on MCH;
- research reproductive behavior and focus obstetrics and gynecology training primarily on practical skills in management of labor and delivery;
- assure every woman of the right to safe motherhood and improve transportation.

In 2018 the World Health Organization noted four recent changes in India which had lowered maternal mortality:

1. the government has increased the available of healthcare for pregnant women and new mothers
2. finance programs like Janani Shishu Suraksha Karyakram have paid for transport to hospital and costs of childbirth
3. Investments in women's education improve health outcomes along with other benefits
4. the government promotes collaboration between private and government clinics through the Pradhan Mantri Surakshit Matritva Abhiyan program

Before 2017 the government focus on maternal mortality was learning about the causes of death to develop a plan for prevention. In 2017 the Indian government shifted focus in its programs to detect risks rather than offer healthcare to prevent the death.

A 2016 national survey expected to find that if a household loses a woman to maternal death, then other women in the household will seek more clinic services during pregnancy and after childbirth. Contrary to expectation, the study instead found that after a maternal death, women instead avoid hospitals and instead seek support from a traditional birth attendant. Reasons for this vary, but part of the explanation is that many of these women could go to the hospital for care but choose to avoid doing so.

Social factors which influence maternal mortality in India are income inequality in India; level of access to Prenatal care and care in the postpartum period; level of woman's education; the position of the mother's community in the regional rural-urban divide; the mother's access to nutrition during pregnancy; the degree of local sanitation; and the caste position of the mother.

The same health monitoring systems which track maternal mortality could also ask women to report other problems, such as lack of good treatment from hospital staff. Healthcare in India measures and reports maternal mortality. Offering general support services to women could improve many aspects of health care.

=== Public health initiatives ===
From 2000-2015 India participated in the Millennium Development Goal to improve maternal health.

The Government of India has started various public health initiatives to provide a safe and secure environment. Some of these initiatives are:

- Janani Suraksha Yojana (JSY),
- Pradhan Mantri Matru Vandana Yojana (PMMVY),
- Pradhan Mantri Surakshit Matritva Abhiyan (PMSMA)
- Poshan Abhiyan and Laqshya

Governments have also taken initiatives on improving the infrastructure of the country by improving roads and providing free ambulance services at Primary Health Centres (PHCs).

== History ==
In 2018 the World Health Organization congratulated India for the great reduction in its maternal mortality ratio since 2005.

Previous to that, various reports described high rates of maternal mortality in India.

== Research ==
Maternal mortality is challenging to study because it is fairly uncommon, it can happen for various reasons, and it is challenging to report. The first nationally representative study of maternal mortality in all of India was in 2014.

Two major global studies in 2015 report maternal mortality in India and contribute to national planning. One study is the Global Burden of Disease Study, which in 2015 for the first time published a national report about India. The other is the 2015 report of the United Nations Maternal Mortality Estimation Inter-Agency Group (UN MMEIG). For the earlier 2013 versions of these two studies, researchers noted that they used different data and analysis to come to different conclusions about changes over time of maternal mortality in India.

In 2017 a report found no significant impact following a large study of 160,000 pregnant women who participated in a one-week educational program to improve maternal health and childbirth outcomes.
