= PKIDs =

American nonprofit organization

PKIDs, which stands for Parents of Kids with Infectious Diseases, was a national nonprofit organization based in the United States that served families of children living with chronic, viral infectious diseases and educates the public on various methods of disease prevention. Founded in 1996 by a handful of parents, the group became a 501(c)(3) nonprofit in 1997. As of Jan. 2024, the PKIDs website is no longer in service.

== History ==
PKIDs started in 1996, when parents adopting internationally were bringing home babies and children with unexpected infections. Parents, wondering what their families were facing, searched for information on the Internet and, while doing so, found each other. In 1997, the nonprofit was officially formed and incorporated in the state of Washington. In that same year, the families served grew to include all sorts of families – adoptive, biological, foster and so on.

== Mission ==
PKIDs' mission is to educate the public about infectious diseases, the methods of prevention and transmission, and the latest advances in medicine; to eliminate the social stigma borne by the infected; and to assist the families of children living with HIV/AIDS, hepatitis, or other chronic, viral infectious diseases with emotional, financial, and informational support.
