= Vaccine Safety Net =

Network of medical information websites

- Formation: 2003
- Legal status: Nonprofit
- Purpose: To provide reliable information on vaccine safety online
- Members: 99 vaccine related websites (2021)
- Parent organization: World Health Organization
- Website: Official website

Vaccine Safety Net (VSN) is a global network of websites aimed at helping people judge the quality of online information on vaccine safety. It was established in 2003 by the World Health Organization (WHO), which had previously set up the independent Global Advisory Committee on Vaccine Safety (GACVS), prompted by concern from public health officials regarding the dissemination of potentially harmful health information via the web. By appraising websites, using credibility and content criteria defined by GACVS, the VSN has been developed to deliver information that is easy to access and up-to-date. As of 2020, the initiative has 89 member sites in 40 countries and 35 languages.

Prior to inclusion in the list, each website is assessed for its credibility, accessibility, content and design. A peer-reviewed study of 26 websites listed by VSN in 2008 noted "the transparency of financing, the lack of links to the pharmaceutical industry, the transparency of site management and responsibility and the proven scientific quality and constant updating of contents" of its assessed resources.

== Purpose ==
The WHO's VSN is a "trusted" website for reliable vaccine related sources. The purpose of the VSN is to evaluate the variable reliability of on-line vaccine related information and address concerns caused by websites which circulate partially complete or misleading content, including speculative rumours or falsified research, which may consequently damage vaccination programmes. It aims to regularly review the vaccine related content disseminated on-line by different health-related organizations around the world, thereby validating them by including them on their list as websites that observe "good information practices".

== History and membership ==
In developed countries, more than 90% of young people use the internet regularly, running the potential for misinformation related to vaccination reaching a large proportion of society. This has also been challenging in low and middle income countries. In 1999, concern from public health officials regarding the dissemination of potentially harmful health information via the web led the WHO to establish the 'Global Advisory Committee on Vaccine Safety' (GACVS), the purpose of which is to deliver an assembly of independent professionals that can advise both the public and those involved in national vaccine policy, after assessing evidence pertaining to vaccine safety concerns that require a quick and impactful response. In 2003, the WHO created the VSN, devised to "help counteract misinformation about vaccines" and deliver easily accessible information to up-to-date accurate evidence, by appraising websites that provide material on vaccination. The credibility and content criteria are defined by GACVS. As a result, the reliability and standards set by WHO's GACVS and available at VSN has been created to help people judge the quality of the website information they read.

In the year of its creation, the VSN approved 23 websites as members in languages including English, French, Dutch, Italian, German and Spanish. In March 2009, the VSN listed a total of 29 websites that had been approved as containing "sound and credible" vaccine safety information. As of 2021 the initiative has 98 member sites in 42 countries and 36 languages.

Recommendations of good practice for vaccine websites are published by the WHO's GACVS. Some member sites refer to their inclusion in the VSN list as a kind of quality certification.

== Members ==
Websites are included to the VSN list following evaluation of their credibility, accessibility, content and design. As listed on the official website, there are currently 99 members which include:

- American Academy of Pediatrics
- Centers for Disease Control and Prevention
- Vaccine Education Center
- Robert Koch Institute
- HPV Prevention and Control Board
- National Foundation for Infectious Diseases
- Immunize Canada
- Institute for Vaccine Safety, Johns Hopkins Bloomberg School of Public Health
- NHS Inform
- Government of Canada
- I Boost Immunity
- Kids Boost Immunity
- Ministry of Health (Argentina)
- Paul-Ehrlich-Institut
- Ghana Food and Drugs Authority
- Public Health Agency of Canada
- Public Health Agency of Sweden
- Regional Assembly of Murcia
- Vaccine Knowledge Project
- Vaccinate Your Family
- The Healthy Indian Project (THIP)
- Vaccine Confidence Project
- Health Feedback
- Medical Dialogues

== Evaluation ==
In 2008 a peer-reviewed study of 26 websites included in the VSN list by April 2007 noted "the transparency of financing, the lack of links to the pharmaceutical industry, the transparency of site management and responsibility and the proven scientific quality and constant updating of contents" of its assessed resources, unlike websites critical of vaccination. 84.6% of sites recorded contact details, 73.1% noted which data protection procedure they used and that the data would not be sold or forwarded to third parties. Most sites used English. About one in five provided contact details of vaccination centres and 63.6% of sites were targeted at the general public and health care professionals. 84.6% of sites were quoted as having information on side effects.

In 2017 the VSN's Web Analytics Project (VSN-WAP) was launched to evaluate the behaviour of people using websites listed at VSN.

== Media ==
Misinformation about vaccines is a concern for the VSN, especially on social media. In 2019, the social media platform Pinterest partnered with the VSN to address the issue. VSN is consistently listed by publications as a source for battling misinformation about vaccinations.
