= Vaccine-preventable disease =

Disease that has an effective preventitive vaccine

Deaths caused by vaccine preventable diseases over time

A vaccine-preventable disease is an infectious disease for which an effective preventive vaccine exists. If a person acquires a vaccine-preventable disease and dies from it, the death is considered a vaccine-preventable death.

The most common and serious vaccine-preventable diseases tracked by the World Health Organization (WHO) are: diphtheria, Haemophilus influenzae serotype b infection, hepatitis B, measles, meningitis, mumps, pertussis, poliomyelitis, rubella, tetanus, tuberculosis, and yellow fever. The WHO reports licensed vaccines being available to prevent, or contribute to the prevention and control of, 31 vaccine-preventable infections.

== Background ==
In 2012, the World Health Organization estimated that vaccination prevents 2.5 million deaths each year. With 100% immunization, and 100% efficacy of the vaccines, one out of seven deaths among young children could be prevented, mostly in developing countries, making this an important global health issue. Four diseases were responsible for 98% of vaccine-preventable deaths: measles, Haemophilus influenzae serotype b, pertussis, and neonatal tetanus.

The Immunization Surveillance, Assessment and Monitoring program of the WHO monitors and assesses the safety and effectiveness of programs and vaccines at reducing illness and deaths from diseases that could be prevented by vaccines.

Vaccine-preventable deaths are usually caused by a failure to obtain the vaccine in a timely manner. This may be due to financial constraints or to lack of access to the vaccine. A vaccine that is generally recommended may be medically inappropriate for a small number of people due to severe allergies or a damaged immune system. In addition, a vaccine against a given disease may not be recommended for general use in a given country, or may be recommended only to certain populations, such as young children or older adults. Every country makes its own immunization recommendations, based on the diseases that are common in its area and its healthcare priorities. If a vaccine-preventable disease is uncommon in a country, then residents of that country are unlikely to receive a vaccine against it. For example, residents of Canada and the United States do not routinely receive vaccines against yellow fever, which leaves them vulnerable to infection if travelling to areas where risk of yellow fever is highest (endemic or transitional regions).

== Lists of vaccine-preventable diseases ==
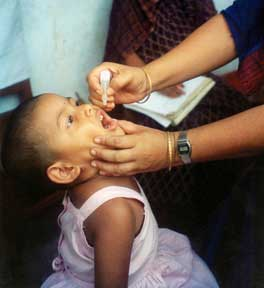
A child being immunized against polio

=== WHO list ===
The WHO lists 28 diseases for which vaccines are available:

1. Chikungunya
2. Cholera
3. COVID-19
4. Dengue fever
5. Diphtheria
6. Haemophilus influenzae type b
7. Hepatitis (A and B only)
8. Human papillomavirus infection
9. Influenza
10. Japanese encephalitis
11. Malaria
12. Measles
13. Meningococcal meningitis
14. Mumps
15. Pertussis
16. Pneumococcal disease
17. Poliomyelitis
18. Rabies
19. Respiratory Syncytial Virus (RSV)
20. Rotavirus
21. Rubella
22. Smallpox and mpox
23. Tetanus
24. Tick-borne encephalitis
25. Tuberculosis
26. Typhoid
27. Varicella
28. Yellow fever

=== Other animals ===
1. Bordetella
2. Canine distemper
3. Canine influenza
4. Canine parvovirus
5. Chlamydia
6. Feline calicivirus
7. Feline distemper
8. Feline leukemia
9. Feline viral rhinotracheitis
10. Leptospirosis
11. Lyme disease

== Vaccine-preventable diseases demonstrated in the laboratory on other animals ==
- Enterococcus gallinarum on mice (to prevent bacteria-triggered autoimmune disease)

== See also ==
- Vaccination policy
- World Immunization Week
- Measles resurgence in the United States
