= SAJE =

Saje or SAJE may refer to:

- säje, an American vocal quartet
- Strategic Actions for a Just Economy (SAJE), a non-profit economic justice organization in Los Angeles
- Saje Natural Wellness, a retailer of essential oils and skin care products in Canada and the United States
