= Community benefits agreement =

Contract between local activist groups and businesses or real estate developers

A community benefits agreement (CBA) in the United States is a contract signed by community groups and a real estate developer that requires the developer to provide specific amenities and/or mitigations to the local community or neighborhood. In exchange, the community groups agree to publicly support the project, or at least not oppose it. Often, negotiating a CBA relies heavily upon the formation of a multi-issue, broad based community coalition including community, environmental, faith-based and labor organizations.

In the United Kingdom, Section 106 agreements and in Ontario, Canada, "Section 37" agreements similarly require certain benefits from developers, but differ from CBAs in that they are part of development agreements with governments, not communities. CBAs are generally private, contractual agreements, although they can in some instances be made part of a development agreement with a city.

== Purposes ==
Economic development projects are often heavily subsidized by taxpayer dollars, but there is usually no guarantee that a project's "ripple effects" will benefit current residents. Developments can cause inner-city gentrification, pushing out low-income residents as housing prices rise, or they may create only low-wage retail and service sector jobs. As a result, many metropolitan regions continue to experience problems related to poverty and housing, despite major investments in economic development.

Responding to these problems, the CBA model was created in the late 1990s as a way for the communities most impacted by economic development projects to participate in the planning process and seek to ensure that development benefits will accrue to existing communities. For developers, negotiating with community representatives can be an attractive way to gain community support and help move their projects forward. Participating in CBA negotiations can eliminate surprises in the development approvals process and allow developers to work with a unified coalition rather than having to engage community organizations one by one.

== The community benefits movement ==
As local governments grappled with their responsibility to shape development and land use patterns, the community benefits movement emerged to challenge conventional thinking and offer a broader vision. Related to smart growth and environmental justice, the community benefits movement aims to ensure that the main purpose of economic development is to bring measurable, permanent improvements to the lives of affected residents, particularly those in low-income neighborhoods and communities of color. Organizations allied with the community benefits movement have pressured the public sector to play a more strategic role in land use planning and urban growth, and to leverage economic development subsidies toward the creation of good jobs, affordable housing, and neighborhood services that improve the quality of life for all residents.

The community benefits movement began in Los Angeles, with successful implementation at mixed-use projects at Hollywood and Highland, and Staples Center / LA Live. It has since spread rapidly to other cities, including Atlanta, Chicago, Denver, Milwaukee, Minneapolis, New Haven, New York City, Philadelphia, Pittsburgh, San Diego, San Francisco, San Jose, Seattle, Syracuse, Washington, D.C., and Wilmington. Leading organizations include National Community Reinvestment Coalition, The Partnership for Working Families, Los Angeles Alliance for a New Economy (LAANE), Strategic Actions for a Just Economy (SAJE), SCOPE Los Angeles, and Pittsburgh UNITED.

CBA advocates contend that the community benefits approach improves the development process for the community, developers and local officials by creating an overall win-win-win scenario. Some of the principles and goals that CBA advocates seek to promote include:

- Inclusiveness: The CBA negotiation process can provide a mechanism to ensure that community concerns are heard and addressed. While some cities do a good job of seeking community input and responding to it, many do not. Low-income neighborhoods, non-English speaking areas, and communities of color have historically been excluded from the development process. Laws concerning public notice and participation are often poorly enforced, and official public hearings are frequently held at times and places that are not neighborhood-friendly. Having a CBA negotiation process can help to address these problems, providing a forum for all parts of an affected community.
- Enforceability: A CBA can ensure that a developer's promises regarding community benefits are legally enforceable. Developers "pitching" a project often make promises that are never written into any project approval documents, and even when they are, they may not be monitored and enforced by the relevant government agencies. By creating an enforcement mechanism or expanding the class of parties who can enforce these promises, CBAs can make enforcement much easier.
- Accountability: CBAs enable citizens to hold governments accountable for the use of tax dollars by giving them a voice in how development subsidies are distributed.

== CBA coalitions ==
At the heart of the community benefits strategy are community organizing and coalition building. Organizing and maintaining a coalition, facilitating compromise and crafting a shared agenda are essential to creating a successful CBA. Coalitions can include a variety of community groups, such as neighborhood groups, environmental organizations, good-government organizations, labor unions, and faith-based organizations. Coalitions are usually unincorporated, but member community groups may enter into an operating agreement to govern their relationship in the coalition. A model CBA coalition operating agreement has been created by the Public Law Center at Tulane University Law School.

Elected officials and government agencies often play an active role in CBA negotiations. In California and other jurisdictions where development agreements are authorized, government representatives may be formal CBA signatories. In other cases, government officials may play a more informal role by facilitating CBA negotiations and encouraging cooperation.

== CBA negotiations ==
Typically, negotiations between a CBA coalition and a developer begin after a project has been announced but prior to governmental approval. However, there are examples of legislative CBA requirements attached to subsidies that impose community benefit standards on land within particular districts. For example, developers participating in the Atlanta Beltline project that opt to use tax increment financing are required to incorporate community benefits through a development or funding agreement.

== Possible benefits ==
The CBA contract model allows each particular CBA to be tailored to the community's needs, the size and type of the proposed development, and the relative bargaining power of the community groups and the developer. Benefits may be provided by the developer itself, or a CBA may require the developer to impose CBA provisions on its tenants, vendors, and contractors. Typically, CBAs include job quality standards, local hiring programs, and affordable housing requirements.

Other benefits include, among other things:

- Living wage and prevailing wage requirements
- Local hiring goals
- Job training programs
- Minority/women/local business contracting goals
- Provisions prohibiting developers from hiring contractors that have violated labor or other occupational laws (known as "responsible contractor" provisions)
- Union neutrality requirements
- Retail/commercial space set-asides for small and local businesses
- Big box retail restrictions
- Green building requirements
- Space set-asides for neighborhood organizations, community centers, child-care centers, and other non-profits
- Construction of parks and recreational facilities
- Provisions for community input in the selection of tenants
- Funding for community organizations/programs
- Mitigations in excess of those required under state/local law that address parking, traffic, increased pollution, and other environmental impacts
- Affordable housing requirements

The range of benefits offered by a CBA has been explored extensively in the scholarly literature, as well as conferences, in an effort to raise awareness about the benefits of CBAs for developers, local government, and struggling communities.

== Monitoring ==
Community groups should consider how each provision in a CBA will be monitored and enforced. Although financial commitments and other one-time benefits may be fairly easy to monitor, other developer and tenant commitments, such as living wage and local hiring requirements, may be in place for decades and require long-term oversight. To address this issue, CBAs have included periodic reporting and disclosure requirements, complaint investigation mechanisms, and provisions establishing oversight committees. Where a CBA is incorporated into a development agreement, government agencies may also play a role in monitoring the CBA's implementation.

== Enforcement ==
As a CBA is a legally binding contract, it can be enforced only by the parties that signed it. CBAs that are incorporated into development agreements can be enforced by the government as well as by community groups. There is no case law regarding the validity and enforceability of CBAs. Donald Trump's 1993 CBA-like contract relating to the New York City Riverside South project was the subject of a 2008 New York Appellate Division opinion, but the court held that the contract's terms were expired.

== Concerns and issues ==
Although numerous CBAs have proven to be successful tools to improve the economic development process, a variety of criticisms have emerged. Perhaps the most significant criticism is that CBAs offer no way to ensure that they are truly representative of community needs and desires. The Atlantic Yards CBA, for example, has been criticized because it was negotiated by only a handful of community groups, all of which are receiving funding from the developer, while many other community groups were excluded from the negotiations. A report from the New York City Bar Association has also questioned whether CBA negotiators will drive appropriate bargains with developers, and whether CBAs will interfere with the planning process. Various legal problems relating to exactions and consideration may also weaken the effectiveness of CBAs.

== Examples ==
CBAs have been negotiated for numerous projects. The most well known CBA is likely the Los Angeles Staples Center CBA, which has generally been viewed as a success. Other projects that have had CBAs include the Dearborn Street Goodwill project in Seattle, the Consol Energy Center arena (for the Penguins hockey team) in Pittsburgh, San Francisco's Bayview–Hunters Point residential development, the Gates-Cherokee redevelopment project in Denver, and the Ballpark Village development in San Diego, and the Obama Presidential Center in Chicago.

The CBAs of some projects have not been accepted as legitimate CBAs by advocates of the community benefits movement. For example, the CBA for the new Yankee Stadium has not been considered to be a "true" CBA because it was negotiated by elected officials, not community groups. The agreement did include significant community benefits such as $28,000,000 in grants and free tickets for local organizations. However, the CBA has not been smoothly implemented. In 2009, the former administer the community fund sued the Yankees' community charity, claiming that the fund had been mismanaged.

In preparation of the 2010 Winter Olympics, the city of Vancouver, British Columbia, Canada, awarded a contract to Millennium Development Corporation to build its 600,000-square-foot (56,000 m^{2}), 600-unit athletes' village on south east False Creek. This development included a CBA with targets to create 100 jobs for locally sourced and trained inner city residents and to procure a targeted $15 million in goods and services from the inner city. It also included a $750,000 legacy fund to train inner city residents. The CBA included investment and support from the Canadian Federal Government, BC Provincial Government, the City of Vancouver and Building Opportunities with Business Inner-City Society Building Opportunities with Business (a community economic development non-profit also known as BOB) these parties collectively are recognized under the Vancouver Agreement. The CBA also received support from Bell, VanCity, the Canadian Housing and Mortgage Corporation and the Vancouver Regional Construction Association. Building Opportunities with Business oversaw the use of the legacy funds, sourced labor and supported the inner city residents with training and aid while the VRCA oversaw the training of residents. Though the Olympic Village was widely criticized for going over budget, in a 2008 report to the City prepared by BOB the creation of 120 jobs with procurement closer to $50 million is cited. The report also admits that tracking the actual economic activity from the development was difficult and that the procurement is not exact. Regardless of the difficulty tracking procurement and the fact that the project went over budget the CBA is widely considered to be a success.

== See also ==
- Project Labor Agreement
