= Project Labor Agreement =

Type of compact allowing trade unions to edit US federal project contracts

A Project Labor Agreement (PLA), also known as a Community Workforce Agreement, is a pre-hire collective bargaining agreement with one or more labor unions that establishes the terms and conditions of employment for a specific construction project. Before any workers are hired on the project, construction unions have bargaining rights to determine the wage rates and benefits of all employees working on the particular project and to agree to the provisions of the agreement. The terms of the agreement apply to all contractors and subcontractors who successfully bid on the project, and supersedes any existing collective bargaining agreements. PLAs are used on both public and private projects, and their specific provisions may be tailored by the signatory parties to meet the needs of a particular project. The agreement may include provisions to prevent any strikes, lockouts, or other work stoppages for the length of the project. PLAs typically require that employees hired for the project are referred through union hiring halls, that nonunion workers pay union dues for the length of the project, and that the contractor follow union rules on pensions, work conditions and dispute resolution.

PLAs are authorized under the National Labor Relations Act (NLRA), 29 U.S.C. §§ 151–169. Sections 8(e) and (f) of the NLRA, 29 U.S.C. §§ 158(e) and (f) make special exceptions from other requirements of the NLRA in order to permit employers to enter into pre-hire agreements with labor unions in the construction industry. The agreements have been in use in the United States since the 1930s, and first became the subject of debate in the 1980s, for their use on publicly funded projects. In these instances, government entities made signing PLAs a condition of working on taxpayer funded projects. This type of PLA is distinct from a PLA voluntarily entered into by contractors on public or private work—as is permitted by the NLRA—as well as a PLA mandated by a private entity on a privately funded construction project.

Presidential executive orders issued since 1992 have affected the use of PLAs for federal construction projects. Executive Order 13502, issued by President Barack Obama in February 2009, encouraged federal agencies to consider mandating PLAs on a case-by-case basis for federal contracts of $25 million or more. President Joe Biden's Executive Order 14063, which revoked Obama's executive order, requires PLAs on federal construction contracts of $35 million or more.

The use of PLAs is opposed by a number of groups, who argue that the agreements discriminate against non-union contractors and do not improve efficiency or reduce costs of construction projects. Studies of PLAs have mixed results, with some studies concluding that PLAs have a favorable impact, while others find that the agreements can increase costs, and may negatively impact non-union contractors and workers.

State‑level building‑trades organizations, such as the Affiliated Construction Trades of Ohio (ACT Ohio), actively promote the use of project labor agreements on public and private construction projects. ACT Ohio argues that PLAs keep construction work and wages local, spur economic development, and ensure timely project completion.

== History ==
=== Early use ===
The earliest uses of Project Labor Agreements in the U.S. date back to several dam projects in the 1930s, including the Grand Coulee Dam in Washington, the Shasta Dam in California and the Hoover Dam in Nevada. Modern PLAs particularly developed from those used in construction carried out during World War II, a period when skilled labor was in demand, construction unions controlled 87% of the national market and government spending on construction had increased significantly over a short period of time. These early PLAs focused on establishing standard rates of pay and preventing work stoppages. PLA projects that followed included Cape Canaveral in the 1960s, Disney World from 1967 to 1971 and the Trans-Alaska Pipeline from 1973 to 1977. During this period and subsequently, the unionized share of the construction industry precipitously declined as construction users sought more open competition. By the 1980s, nonunion contractors claimed in excess of 80% of the construction work, in a wide variety of trades, with some variation in different parts of the country.

=== Boston Harbor and executive orders ===
The Boston Harbor reclamation project that began in the 1980s became the focus of debate over the legality of PLAs. When the Massachusetts Water Resources Authority elected to use a PLA for the project that mandated union-only labor, the Associated Builders and Contractors of Massachusetts/Rhode Island, Inc. challenged its legality, asserting that the use of a PLA was prohibited by the National Labor Relations Act. In 1990, the First Circuit federal appeals court ruled that the Boston Harbor PLA breached federal labor law because of its union-work requirement.

On October 23, 1992, while the Boston Harbor case was still in court, President George H. W. Bush signed Executive Order 12818 prohibiting federal agencies from exclusively contracting union labor for construction projects. Bush's order prohibited the use of PLAs in federal construction projects. The Clinton administration rescinded this order when President Bill Clinton issued Executive Order 12836 in February 1993, shortly after he took office. This order allowed federal agencies to fund construction projects where contractors required a PLA. One month later, in the Boston Harbor cleanup case, the United States Supreme Court unanimously upheld the use of the agreements on public projects. The Supreme Court ruled that if the government was in the role of a regulator, it was not able to require PLA use under labor law preemption principles, however, it could choose to do so as a market participant without being preempted by the National Labor Relations Act. The Court did not address the separate question of whether government-mandated PLAs are lawful under federal or state competitive bidding laws. The decision led to increased use of PLAs in public-sector construction projects throughout the U.S.

In 1997, Clinton proposed an executive order stating that federal agencies must consider use of PLAs for federally funded projects. Republicans staunchly opposed the move, believing it would restrict federal projects to union contractors only. Clinton abandoned the proposed executive order, but issued a memorandum on June 5, 1997, encouraging federal departments to consider the use of PLAs for “large and significant” projects. The memorandum required that government agencies review each project to decide whether a PLA would allow the agency to increase efficiency and reduce costs.

=== Prohibition for federal and federally assisted projects ===
On February 17, 2001, President George W. Bush signed Executive Order 13202, “Preservation of Open Competition and Government Neutrality Towards Government Contractors’ Labor Relations on Federal and Federally Funded Construction Projects”, prohibiting the use of PLA mandates for construction projects with federal funding. This order stated that construction projects receiving federal funding would not be allowed to impose project labor agreements. Specifically, the order declared that neither the federal government, nor any agency acting with federal assistance, shall require or prohibit construction contractors to sign union agreements as a condition of performing work on federally funded construction projects. The order allowed any PLAs that had previously been agreed to continue, and did not affect projects that did not receive federal funding. Bush's order revoked the previous executive order affecting PLAs, Clinton's order 12836, which revoked the executive order issued by President George H.W. Bush in 1992. President George W. Bush issued an amendment in April 2001 (Executive Order 13208), allowing certain projects to be exempted from this order, if a project-related contract had already been awarded with a PLA requirement or prohibition at the time of the order.

In August 2001, U.S. District Court ruled Executive Order 13202 invalid in a case examining the use of a PLA by Maryland for the Woodrow Wilson Bridge replacement project. The court ruled that the order was invalid as it conflicted with the National Labor Relations Act. The judge issued a permanent injunction to block enforcement of the order on November 7, 2001. In July 2002, the U.S. Court of Appeals for the District of Columbia overturned the District Court's decision and ordered the removal of the injunction. Following this decision, the Department of Defense, NASA and the General Services Administration formally recognized the order in the Federal Register and implemented it in their construction bidding processes.

Although the Court of Appeals decision in 2002 upheld the executive order prohibiting federal projects from using PLAs, individual states and counties were permitted to use PLAs for some public works where funding was from state and local revenue. These PLAs received opposition by organizations such as the Associated Builders and Contractors, and the Black Contractors Group. A notable example of pro-PLA legislation was passed in New Jersey, which enacted a law in 2002 allowing use of PLAs for some government funded projects.

=== PLA use since 2009 ===
On February 6, 2009, President Barack Obama signed executive order 13502, which urges federal agencies to consider mandating the use of PLAs on federal construction projects costing $25 million or more on a case-by-case basis. This act served to revoke the Bush executive orders 13202 and 13208 from eight years earlier that prohibited government-mandated PLAs on federal and federally funded construction projects. The Obama order states that federal agencies can require a PLA if such an agreement will achieve federal goals in economy and efficiency. According to the terms of the order, non-union contractors may compete for contracts subject to PLAs, but they must agree to the various terms and conditions contained in each PLA in order to win a federal contract and build a project. A key change from the 2001 order is that by repealing the Bush orders, the Obama order permits recipients of federal funding, such as state, local and private construction owners, to mandate PLAs on public works projects of any size. However, the order does not encourage or mandate recipients of federal assistance to use a government-mandated PLA.

With the February 2009 stimulus bill allocating approximately $140 billion for federal, state and local construction projects, battles over government-mandated PLAs on public works projects from 2009 to 2011 have been widespread at the state and local government level. Government officials and legislators have clashed over using PLA mandates on projects in states including Iowa, Oregon, Ohio, California, and others. Individual communities have voted on whether to prohibit the use of government-mandated PLAs on taxpayer funded construction projects, including ballot initiatives in Chula Vista, Oceanside, and in San Diego County, California in 2010, which resulted in officials being prohibited from mandating or prohibiting the use of PLAs for government projects. In 2011, contractors filed bid protests with the Government Accountability Office against government mandated PLAs for construction projects in New Hampshire, New Jersey, Pennsylvania and Washington, D.C. These protests led to federal PLA mandates being removed from project solicitations in each case.

President Joe Biden's Executive Order 14063, which revoked Obama's executive order, requires PLAs on federal construction contracts of $35 million or more and established a training strategy for Contracting Officers. Federal Acquisition Regulation 52.222-34 provides for a contract clause for inclusion in a relevant construction contract, requiring maintenance of a PLA for the duration of the project. According to the Federal Acquisition Regulatory Council's 2022 proposed rule implementing Executive Order 14063, from FY 2009 to FY 2021, federal agencies mandated PLAs on just 12 out of more than 2,000 federal construction contracts covered by the Obama order.

As of March 2023, through legislation or by executive order issued by the state governor, the following 25 states have active laws banning government-mandated project labor agreements on state, state-assisted and/or local taxpayer-funded construction projects to some degree: Alabama, Arizona, Arkansas, Florida, Georgia, Idaho, Iowa, Kansas, Kentucky, Louisiana, Michigan, Mississippi, Missouri, Montana, North Carolina, North Dakota, Oklahoma, South Carolina, South Dakota, Tennessee, Texas, Utah, West Virginia, Wisconsin and Wyoming. All legal challenges to these laws have failed. State policies restricting government-mandated PLAs were repealed in Maine, Minnesota, Nevada and Virginia following Democratic party trifectas in state government. States with executive orders, or that have enacted legislation authorizing or encouraging the use of PLAs on public projects include California, Connecticut, Hawaii, Illinois, Maryland, Maine, New Jersey, New York, Virginia, and Washington State.

The Biden administration is pushing state and local governments to require PLAs on federally assisted projects via more than $250 billion worth of federal agency grant programs that give grant applicants favorable treatment if PLAs are required on taxpayer-funded infrastructure projects procured by state and local governments seeking federal dollars flowing from new programs in the Infrastructure Investment and Jobs Act, the American Rescue Plan Act and other legislation passed by Congress that authorize and fund infrastructure dollars but are silent on PLA preferences and requirements. The Biden administration has also been criticized for pushing PLA mandates on private construction projects receiving federal grants and tax breaks, such as pro-PLA policy contained in the U.S. Department of Commerce CHIPS Incentives Program's Commercial Fabrication Facilities Notice of Funding Opportunity.

On February 27, 2023, Rep. James Comer, R-Ky., and Sen. Todd Young, R-Ind., introduced the Fair and Open Competition Act (H.R. 1209 / S. 537), legislation which promotes fair and open competition on contracts to build taxpayer-funded federal and federally assisted construction projects by restricting the use of government-mandated project labor agreements. The legislation is supported by a large coalition of construction and employer associations.

== Debate over use ==
There has been much debate over the government-mandated PLAs, particularly for publicly funded projects. The use of project labor agreements is supported by the construction unions, and some political figures, who state that PLAs are needed to ensure that large, complex projects are completed on time and on schedule. According to those who support the use of such agreements, PLAs enable project owners to control costs and ensure that there are no disruptions to the construction schedule, for example from strikes. In particular, proponents of PLAs point to the inclusion of clauses in the agreement that agree to establish labor management problem solving committees that deal with scheduling, quality control, health and safety, and productivity problems during the project. They also state that PLAs ensure that the workforce hired has received training and is of high quality. The use of PLAs in large private construction projects such as the building of the New England Patriots' Gillette Stadium, are given as examples of how PLAs help project owners meet tight deadlines, according to supporters. In addition to the stated benefits to project owners, supporters of PLAs also say that PLA use has a positive impact on local communities, through set goals for local hiring and provision of education.

A coalition of U.S. construction and employer groups, including the Associated General Contractors of America (AGC), Associated Builders and Contractors (ABC), Construction Industry Roundtable (CIRT), National Federation of Independent Business (NFIB), the National Black Chamber of Commerce, and the U.S. Chamber of Commerce have actively opposed the use of PLAs, particularly for those mandated by lawmakers on taxpayer-funded construction projects procured by federal, state and local government. These groups have challenged the use of such agreements through litigation, lobbying, public relations campaigns. Opponents of PLAs supported the Bush executive order prohibiting government-mandated PLAs, and have argued that between 2001 and 2008, when the executive order was in place, no federal projects suffered significant labor problems, delays or cost overruns attributable to the absence of PLAs. Surveys of nonunion contractors suggest that government-mandated PLAs, increase costs; reduce competition; decrease economy and efficiency in government contracting; undermine investments in workforce development programs; reduce/have no impact on project safety, quality, budget or timeliness; result in worse local hiring outcomes; and decrease hiring of women, veteran and disadvantaged business enterprises and construction workers. According to those who oppose PLAs, the agreements place restrictions on the hiring and working practices of contractors, and can lead to increased costs for project owners.

One of their objections to PLAs is that the agreements require contractors to obey inefficient union work rules and pay into union benefits plans even if they have existing benefits plans, which can increase labor costs and expose contractors to additional uncertainty and financial risk in the form of multi-employer pension plan liabilities. In addition, they oppose the use of PLAs to restrict hiring on projects to construction workers selected by unions through union hiring halls, stating that this does not increase the quality of worker as all those who are licensed in a craft have at least the same level of education and skill, regardless of whether they belong to a union. Opponents object to clauses in typical PLAs that force contractors to replace most or all of their existing employees with unfamiliar union labor from union hiring halls because it can reduce workforce safety, productivity and diversity. Research has found that the limited number of nonunion craft professionals permitted to work on construction projects subject to a government-mandated PLA suffer an estimated 34% reduction in wages and benefits unless they force their existing workforce to accept union representation, pay union dues and/or join a union as a condition of employment and receiving benefits on a PLA jobsite. Opponents also claim provisions in typical PLAs require contractors to hire apprentices only from apprenticeship programs affiliated with unions, which limits investments in employer and association government-registered apprenticeship programs not affiliated with unions and may exacerbate skilled labor shortages within the construction industry expected to top half a million workers in 2023.

Another point of debate is the proportion of construction workers who are unionized. According to opponents, under PLAs contractors must hire their construction workers through union hiring halls, and unionized workers are the majority of those who work on PLA projects, despite non-union workers making up the majority of the construction workforce. Estimates of the percentage of construction workers who are non-union, cited by opponents of PLAs, are around 85%, based on figures from the U.S. Department of Labor Bureau of Labor Statistics, and more recent data puts this figure at a record high of 88.3%. This figure has been disputed by supporters of PLAs, who state that the figures given by those in opposition to PLAs are misleading and are based on census data that encompasses too broad a concept of a construction worker. According to a study by Cornell University in 2010 cited by Mary Vogel, in Massachusetts 60% of the Construction Trades is unionized. Mary Vogel is the executive director of the Construction Institute, a non-profit organization dedicated to the needs of the unionized construction sector in Massachusetts. In 2021, a state's percentage of the construction workforce belonging to a construction union varied from a low of 1.8% (South Carolina) to a high of 34.5% (Illinois), with 25 states having lower unionization rates than the U.S. construction industry's average of 12.6%.

A number of politicians do not agree with the use of government-mandated PLAs for publicly funded construction projects, and have introduced bills or executive orders that prohibit using the agreements for government projects or prevent the use of public funds for projects using PLAs.

=== Impact on cost ===
A main argument has been the impact of PLAs on project cost. Those who oppose PLAs state that the agreements impact competition for project bids, reducing the number of potential bidders as non-union contractors are less likely to bid due to the potential restrictions a PLA would pose. According to opponents of the agreements, the reduced competition leads to higher bids and a higher cost for the project owner. In addition, opponents argue that the cost may also be increased due to contractors having greater expenses under a PLA. For example, according to Max Lyons of the Employee Policy Foundation, the cost of a project under a PLA is increased up to 7%, since contractors are required to pay their employees the union wage, rather than the government-determined prevailing wage. Opponents have also argued that there is evidence to show that PLA mandates add costs by forcing non-union contractors to pay into union benefit plans and their existing benefit plans.

Supporters of PLA use argue that the end cost of projects is not increased if a PLA is in place, compared to projects without such an agreement, since the agreements prevent cost overruns. In response, opponents of the agreements cite examples of projects a PLA was in place and costs overran including Boston's Big Dig project, Safeco Field in Seattle, and the San Francisco International Airport. An August 2021 study by the Rand Corporation found that PLAs on affordable housing projects in Los Angeles increased construction costs by 14.5% and approximately 800 additional units (an increase of 11% more housing units) could have been produced without a PLA policy. Multiple studies examining the impact of PLAs on school construction costs in Connecticut (2020), New Jersey (2019), and Ohio (2017) by the Beacon Hill Institute found that PLA projects experienced increased costs by up to 20% compared to similar non-PLA school projects also subject to state prevailing wage laws, echoing findings from previous research on the cost of PLAs on school construction conducted in Massachusetts (2003), Connecticut (2004) and New York (2006). In 2010, the New Jersey Department of Labor studied the impact of PLAs on the cost of school construction in New Jersey during 2008, and found that school construction projects where a PLA was used had 30.5% higher costs, per square foot, than those without a PLA. A 2009 study of PLAs on federal construction projects, carried out by Rider Levett Bucknall to determine whether PLAs should be used in the U.S. Department of Veterans Affairs' construction projects, found that costs would increase if PLAs are used for construction projects in locations where union membership is low. According to their analysis, in areas including Denver, Colorado, New Orleans, Louisiana, and Orlando, Florida, where unions do not have a great presence, use of PLAs for projects would lead to cost increases from 5% to 9%. In two cities, San Francisco and New York City, where unions have a great presence, the study predicted mixed results regarding potential cost savings ranging from small project cost increases to small cost savings.

=== Impact on competition ===
Opponents of PLAs state that the agreements impact competition for project bids, which can lead to higher costs. It is argued by those who oppose PLAs, such as former ABC president Henry Kelly, that PLAs discourage if not prevent non-unionized contractors from competing for construction projects, particularly federal projects. However, a 2025 Illinois Economic Policy Institute analysis of more than 2,500 bids found that PLAs increased bid competition by an average of 14 percent.

Competitive bidding statutes discourage public sector PLAs from discrimination between non-union and union contractors, as discrimination between bidders would typically represent a violation of such statutes. Non-union contractors have been awarded contracts on public sector PLA projects, such as the Boston Harbor project. In the United States Supreme Court ruling on the use of a PLA for the Boston Harbor project, it was stated that project owners are within their rights to choose a contractor who is willing to enter into a pre-hire agreement, and that contractors have a choice whether or not they wish to enter such an agreement. However, in a subsequent case the Supreme Court observed the following limitation on the Boston Harbor holding, "In finding that the state agency had acted as a market participant, we stressed that the challenged action "was specifically tailored to one particular job.""

PLAs often require all companies to obtain their workers from union hiring halls, though the union controlling this employee referral system may not discriminate on the basis of a worker's union or non-union status. It is often the case, however, that the hired employees must join a union and pay union dues, usually for the duration of the project. PLA opponents argue that the union control of hiring prevents a non-union contractor for using its own employees and efficient work practices. The increased cost to contractors and the impact on their workers of joining a union, is said by opponents of PLAs to discourage non-union contractors from bidding on projects with a PLA. For instance, a project in Ohio in 2010, to build dormitories for two schools saw an increased number of bids when a PLA was no longer required, and the bid prices were 22% lower than they had been when a PLA was in place.

=== Local impact ===
According to supporters, PLAs can be used by public project owners like school boards or city councils to set goals for creating local jobs and achieving social welfare goals through the construction projects they apply to. PLAs may include provisions for targeted hiring and apprenticeship ratio provisions. According to proponents, by including requirements for a certain proportion of local workers to enter union apprenticeship programs working on the construction program, PLAs can be used to help local workers gain skills. The term "Community Workforce Agreement" (CWA) may be used to describe PLAs with community-focused provisions. Proponents state that Community Workforce Agreements re-inject the tax dollars paying for these infrastructure projects back to the communities. Those who oppose PLAs have pointed to examples such as the construction of the Yankee Stadium and the Washington Nationals Ballpark, for both of which community focused agreements were in place but the goals of local hiring and resources to be provided to the community were not met. According to a report for the DC Sports & Entertainment Commission, the PLA for the Nationals Ballpark failed to meet its three main goals of local workers performing 50% of journeyman hours, apprenticeships provided to city residents only, and apprentices to carry out 25% of the work hours on the project. According to groups such as ABC, since the PLAs require that workers are hired through the unions and there are much fewer union workers, this can mean that meeting local hiring goals is impossible.

=== Impact on minority contractors ===
A number of women and minority contractor groups oppose project labor agreements, arguing that PLAs disproportionately impact small businesses, particularly those owned by women and minorities. These groups argue that PLAs are anti-free-market and discriminatory. In particular, groups including the National Association of Women Business Owners, have voiced their opposition to PLAs, and in 1998, there was a House hearing dedicated to the issue of minority groups' opposition to government-mandated PLAs. The National Black Chamber of Commerce opposes the use of PLAs due to the low numbers of black union members in the construction industry. According to the NBCC, implementing PLAs leads to discrimination against black workers who are generally non-union workers and also prevents contractors from using casual laborers. According to the United States Pan-Asian American Chamber of Commerce, the majority of their membership comprises small businesses that are unfairly impacted by PLAs, particularly due to increased costs and lowered employee benefits.

== Research and reports ==
A number of studies and reports have been published, aiming at identifying the impact of PLAs. In addition to academic research, reports have been produced by government agencies and individuals on behalf of state or federal government. In 1998 the Government Accountability Office produced a report on PLAs that noted an overall lack of data but reported that both “proponents and opponents of the use of PLAs said it would be difficult to compare contractor performance on federal projects with and without PLAs because it is highly unlikely that two such projects could be found that were sufficiently similar in cost, size, scope, and timing.” The GAO report concluded that it would be difficult to draw "any definitive conclusions" on the impact of PLAs on performance. More recent reports include a favorable study of PLAs from the Cornell University School of Industrial and Labor Relations, in 2009, reports produced by the Beacon Hill Institute since 2003, which conclude that PLAs increase costs of projects, and an analysis published by the National University System Institute for Policy Research, which found that PLAs increased the cost of school construction in California.

In addition to studies examining the use of PLAs and their impact, reports are available detailing the history of PLA use and the arguments for and against their use. Reports examining the history of PLA use, include a 2001 California State Library report, compiled for California State Senate, which recounts the history of PLAs in California and uses case studies to examine the features of public and private PLAs. In a 2001 University of Pennsylvania Journal of Law article, the author outlines the arguments on either side of PLAs and evaluates the state of the law since the 1993 Boston Harbor case decision. The article finds that while there are benefits to PLA use, they can present risks and should only be allowed on projects where they will further the goals of competitive bidding statutes, namely timely, efficient, high quality, and inexpensive construction.

=== Reports supporting PLAs ===
Studies have found that PLAs offer benefits to project owners and local communities, and do not disadvantage nonunion contractors and employees. A 2009 study by Fred B. Kotler, J.D., associate director of the Cornell University School of Industrial and Labor Relations found that there is no evidence that PLAs discriminate against employers and workers, limit the pool of bidders, and raise construction costs. In a 2009 report by Dale Belman, of Michigan State University; Matthew M. Bodah of the University of Rhode Island and Peter Philips of the University of Utah, the authors stated that rather than increase cost, the agreements provide benefits to the community. According to their report, project cost is directly related to the complexity of a project, not the existence of an agreement. They found that PLAs are not suited to all projects, but some projects are good candidates for their use, such as highly complex construction projects. Studies have also considered how PLAs may benefit communities through hiring locals. In a paper focused on whether PLAs for projects developed by the Los Angeles Community College District (LACCD), the Los Angeles Unified School District (LAUSD), and the City of Los Angeles met local hiring goals, the author found that the goal of 30% local hires set by the PLAs was met.

Reports and studies addressing the cost impact of PLAs on construction projects have found that they may not lead to greater costs, such as a 2002 paper by the Harvard University Joint Center for Housing Studies, which states that the increased costs cited by opponents of PLAs is based on bids rather than end costs. According to the paper, a project's end costs would usually be higher than bid costs due to expenses that arise during construction. In addition, a 2004 report by the Director of General Services for Contra Costa County, California reported that bids for five of eight projects subject to a PLA were lower than the architect/engineer cost estimate. In 2004 a report written on the use of PLAs in Iowa states that PLA use increases efficiency and cost effectiveness of construction projects. "Public-sector PLAs on complex projects or projects where timely project completion is important have been shown to provide the performance desired by contractors and project managers, who repeatedly use them." A 2009 paper concluded that there was difficulty in identifying the effect of PLAs on cost in construction of schools, due to the differences between schools built with PLAs and those built without them. The report stated that there was not any statistically significant evidence for an increase in costs for school construction.

Reports on the legal considerations affecting PLAs make the case that PLAs are an effective tool for labor relations. In a report in 1999, on the legality of PLAs, the authors stated that PLAs "serve as a productive and stabilizing force in the construction industry.” This is supported by a UCLA study that challenged findings of the Beacon Hill Institute on PLAs, which found that in the private sector, the usage of PLAs "creates continuity and stability of the work force at the job site".

=== Reports opposing PLAs ===
An August 2021 study by the Rand Corporation found that government-mandated PLAs on affordable housing projects in Los Angeles increased construction costs by 14.5% and approximately 800 additional units (an increase of 11% more housing units) could have been produced without a government-mandated PLA policy.

Multiple studies examining the impact of government-mandated PLAs on school construction costs in Connecticut (2020), New Jersey (2019), and Ohio (2017) by the Beacon Hill Institute found that PLA projects experienced increased costs by up to 20% compared to similar non-PLA school projects also subject to state prevailing wage laws, echoing findings from previous research on the cost of PLAs on school construction conducted in Massachusetts (2003), Connecticut (2004) and New York (2006). A report on PLAs by BHI, published in 2009, examined whether claims made in Obama's executive order that PLAs have a positive economic impact are correct. The report considered the findings of the institute's studies, further case studies of PLA and non-PLA projects and addressed criticisms of their previous studies and concluded that the justifications for PLA use in the executive order were not proven. In particular the report concluded that there was no economic benefit to taxpayers in using PLAs.

An independently reviewed 2011 study by The National University System Institute for Policy Research analyzed the cost impact of PLAs on school construction in California from 1996 to 2008. The study analyzed 551 school construction projects and is reportedly the largest study of PLAs to have been undertaken to date. It found that the use of PLAs added between 13% and 15% to construction costs, which would represent a cost increase of between $28.90 and $32.49 per square foot when adjusted for inflation. However, this study's conclusions were strongly disputed by Dr. Dale Belman of Michigan State University, a long-time proponent of the use of PLAs and whose prior research it referenced repeatedly, and who claimed the study misrepresented his findings. He wrote the authors: "Although your study has several serious statistical issues, at the end of the day, your results are basically consistent with those presented in my article on PLAs and Massachusetts school construction costs. The take-away from your results can be summarized as follows: When appropriate controls are included for differences in the characteristics of schools built including school type and location, building specifications, materials used etc., there is no statistical evidence that PLA schools are more costly compared to non PLA schools." The study authors point out in the report that they employed robust regression methods to account for variances in school construction materials/techniques and location. Robust regression is a statistical technique that is used in conjunction with predictive models when the data set lacks normal distribution, or when there are substantive outliers that may skew the results from a standard regression test. In a robust regression analysis, the influence of outliers is down-weighted, allowing more statistical relationships to appear in the results.

In 2010, the New Jersey Department of Labor studied the impact of government-mandated PLAs on the cost of school construction in New Jersey during 2008, and found that school construction projects where a PLA was used had 30.5% higher costs, per square foot, than those without a PLA.

Earlier studies also found increased costs when PLAs were used, including a study in 2000 of a Nevada Water Authority project PLA, which found that the project cost an additional $200,000 because the true low bidder refused to sign the PLA. The project then went to a union contractor whose bid was $200,000 higher. Also in 2000, a study commissioned by the Jefferson County, New York Board of Legislators examining the potential use of a PLA for the Jefferson County Courthouse Complex concluded that a PLA could result in additional costs of more than $955,000. The total estimated increase of costs for the projects, should a PLA be used, would have represented 7% of the total cost of the project.

In addition to increased costs of projects, studies have found that PLAs can lead to greater costs for nonunion contractors and can lower their employees' take home pay. In 2009 and 2021 studies by John R. McGowan of Saint Louis University found that nonunion workers on government-mandated PLA projects have reduced wages, compared with what they would receive for work on a non-PLA project. In addition, nonunion employers would have to pay for additional benefits that their employees would be ineligible for and might be liable for pension fund withdrawal liability costs if the terms of the PLA mean they have to contribute to a union pension fund for the duration of the project.

PLAs also may impact competition by discouraging nonunion bidders, according to surveys of contractors and studies including a September 2001 study by Ernst & Young, commissioned by Erie County, New York. This study analyzed the impact of PLAs on public construction projects and concluded that the number of bidders was reduced for projects with a PLA, as "the use of PLAs strongly inhibits participation in public bidding by non-union contractors." The Worcester Municipal Research Bureau produced a report in 2001, based on a number of studies of PLA use. The report stated that PLAs reduced the number of bidders on construction projects, and led to lower savings than would be possible where contractors are able to work under their usual arrangements for employees. In March 1995, an ABC study of the taxpayer costs for Roswell Park Comprehensive Cancer Center in Buffalo, New York, assessed bids for the same project both before and after a PLA was temporarily imposed in 1995. It revealed that there were 30% fewer bidders to perform the work and that costs increased by more than 26%.

In terms of wider economic impact, a November 2000 Price Waterhouse Coopers study requested by the Los Angeles Unified School District was not able to confirm whether the project stabilization/labor agreement for the district's Proposition BB construction had produced either a positive or negative economic impact. In March 2006, the Public Interest Institute released a study that concludes that the PLA agreed for the construction of the Iowa Events Center project in downtown Des Moines, placed an “unnecessary burden” on local workers, businesses and taxpayers.

== See also ==
- Community benefits agreement
