= United Nations Public Service Awards =

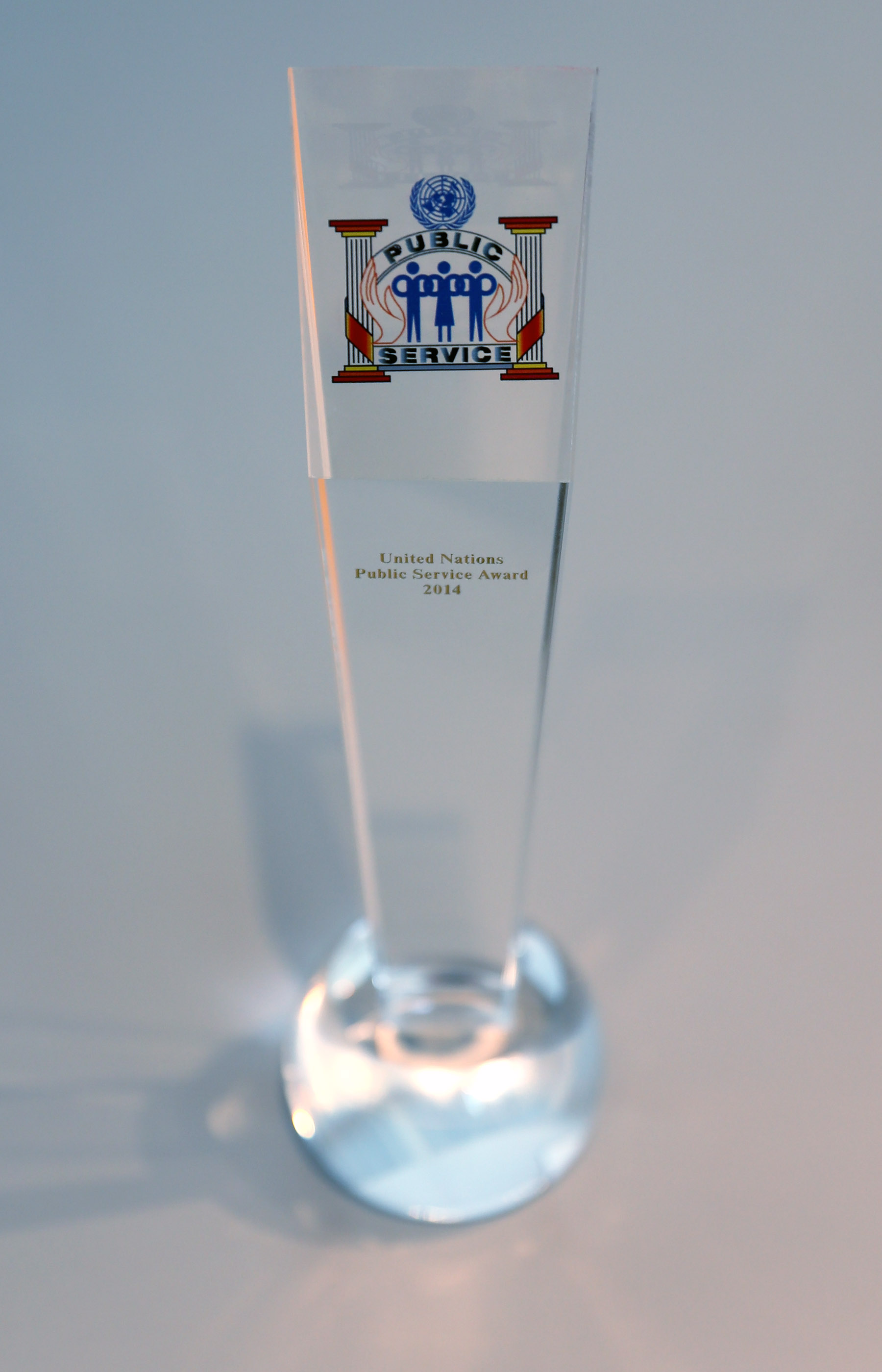
United Nations Public Service Award, 2014

The United Nations Public Service Award (UNPSA) is an international award recognizing excellence in public service. Through an annual competition, UNPSA promotes the role of public service, and rewards effective and responsive public service institutions.

== History and purpose ==
In 2003, the UN General Assembly, in its resolution A/RES/57/277, designated June 23 as the UN Public Service Day to "celebrate the value and virtue of public service to the community". The UN Economic and Social Council established that the United Nations Public Service Awards be bestowed on Public Service Day for contributions made to the cause of enhancing the role, prestige and visibility of public service.

The United Nations Millennium Declaration emphasized the role of democratic and participatory governance in assuring the rights of men and women to "live their lives and raise their children in dignity, free from hunger and from the fear of violence, oppression, or injustice". It also noted that good governance within each country is a prerequisite to "making development a reality for everyone and to freeing the entire human race from want".

The UNPSA program is managed by the Division for Public Institutions and Digital Government of the United Nations Department of Economic and Social Affairs.

The overall purpose of UNPSA is to recognize the institutional contribution made by public servants to enhance the role, professionalism, image and visibility of the public service (Economic and Social Council decision 2000/231).

== Who is eligible ==
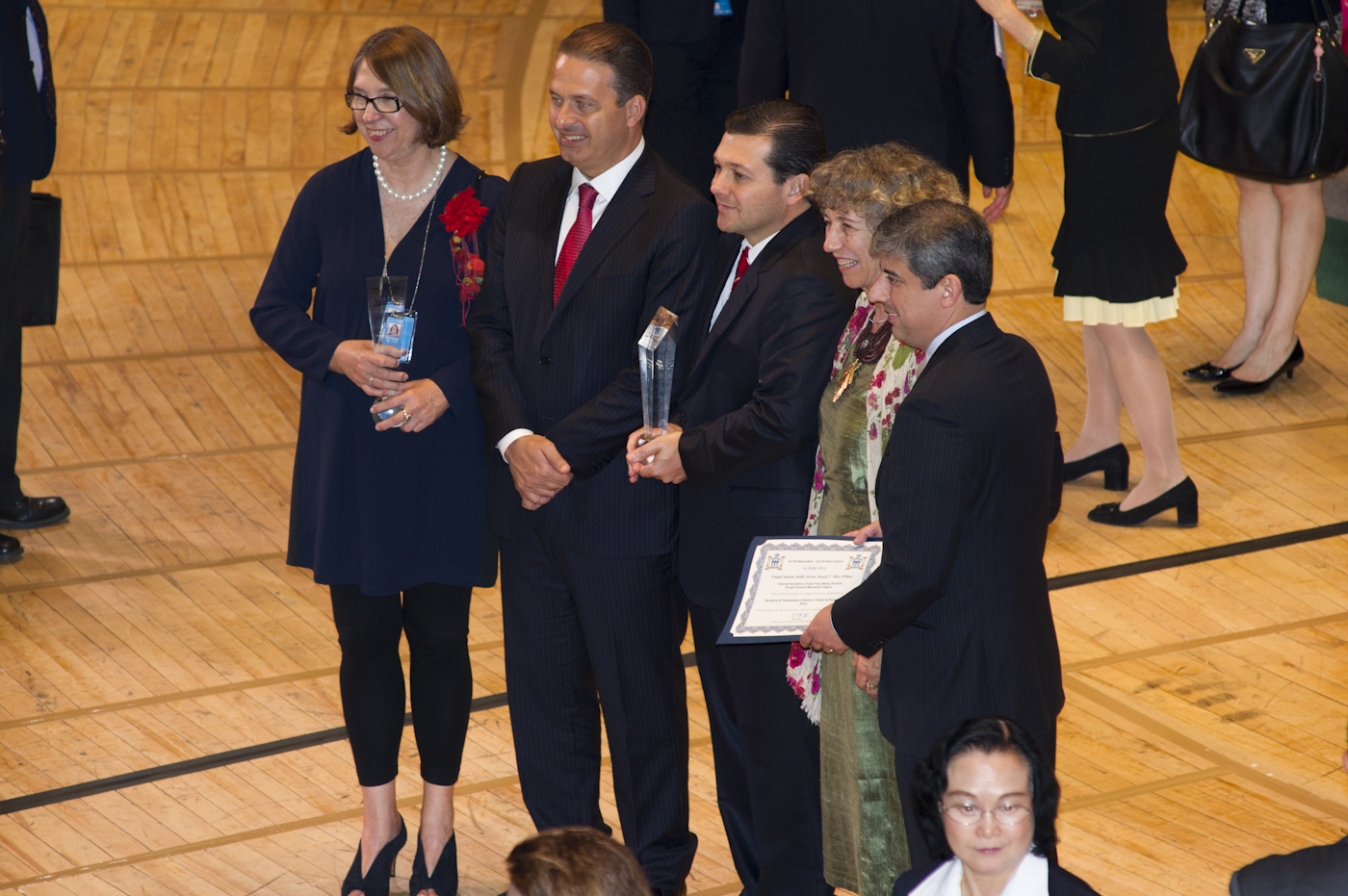
United Nations Public Service Award, 2012

All Public organizations/agencies at national and sub-national levels, as well as public/private partnerships and organizations performing outsourced public service functions, are eligible for nomination. The United Nations Public Service Awards take into consideration a geographical distribution of five regions. In order to level the playing field for nominations received from countries with varying levels of development and income, the following five regions have been established:

(a) Africa
(b) Asia and the Pacific
(c) Europe and North America
(d) Latin America and the Caribbean
(e) Western Asia

Eligible nominators include: Government departments and agencies; universities, non-governmental organizations, professional associations, etc. Purely scientific innovations, e.g. in medical or environmental science, do not qualify for the United Nations Public Service Awards.

== UNPSA categories and criteria ==
For the 2021 round of nominations, the United Nations Public Service Awards categories are as follows:

Category 1: Fostering innovation to deliver inclusive and equitable services for all including through digital transformation;
Category 2: Enhancing the effectiveness of public institutions to reach the SDGs;
Category 3: Promoting gender-responsive public services to achieve the SDGs; and
Category 4: Institutional preparedness and response in times of crisis.

For a description of the categories and application criteria, see UN Public Service Awards

== Application process ==
The application process consists of two steps.

Step 1
An application form has to be completed online. Nominations are allowed to enter the competition in one of the six official United Nations languages (Arabic, Chinese, English, French, Russian or Spanish).

Step 2
Upon reception of the applications, the Division for Public Institutions and Digital Government (DPIDG) pre-selects nominations. Candidates are asked to submit additional information such as a cover letter, letters of reference, supporting documents (e.g., evaluation and audit reports, results of client surveys), etc during the application process. DPIDG then shortlists candidates on the basis of the documents provided. The short-listed are subsequently considered by the United Nations Committee of Experts in Public Administration. After due consideration, the Committee advises the UN Secretary-General concerning the winners of the Awards.

== UN Public Service Awards ceremony ==
UN Public Service Awards' winners are recognized during UN Public Service Day on 23 June of every year at a high-level event held in New York at UN Headquarters or in a host country as part of the United Nations Public Service Forum. UN Public Service Day intends to celebrate the value and virtue of public service to the community; highlight the contribution of public service in the development process; recognize the work of public servants, and encourage young people to pursue careers in the public sector. Since the first Awards Ceremony in 2003, the United Nations has received an increasing number of submissions from all around the world.

== Past award winners ==
Year	Category	Region	Country, Department / Project
2003	1	Europe & North America	Greece Ministry of Interior, Public Administration and Decentralization for "Call centre to apply for administrative documents"
		Asia & the Pacific	Singapore Infocom Development Authority of Singapore for "National Trust Council and TrustSg Programme"
		Western Asia	Oman Muscat Municipality for "Cleanliness of Muscat"
		Latin America	Bolivia Aduana Nacional de Bolivia "Un profundo proceso de reforma"
	2	Europe & North America	Spain Ayuntamiento de Alcobendas "ITACA Proyecto"
		Africa	Egypt Ministry of State for "Administrative Development Improvement of administrative machinery"
		Asia & The Pacific	Singapore Legal Policy Division, Ministry of Law "Polygon of Good Laws"
		Latin America	Mexico Victoria, Tamaulipas "Family system in Tamaulipas"
	3	Europe & North America	Italy Public Administration Department for Efficiency in the Administrations for "Coordination Centre for Innovations in Administrations"
		Africa	Zambia Patents and Companies Registration Office Commercialization
		Asia & The Pacific	Republic of Korea Public Procurement Service for "Reform of procurement operations"
		Western Asia	Lebanon Education Center for "Research and Development Research, training and continuous education"
		Latin America	Chile Servicio de Impuestos Internos (SII) for "El sitio web del servicio"
2004	1	Africa	Morocco, Secretariat d'Etat Charge de l'eau, Morocco
		Europe & North America	Canada, Network of Canada Business Service Centres
		Latin America	Brazil, General Board for Development of Public Services and Public
	2	Europe & North America	Austria, District Administrative Authority Zell am See Summary of the Project
		Africa	Cameroon, Ministere de la Fonction Publique et de la Reforme
		Asia & The Pacific	Australia, Australian Public Service Commission
		Latin America	Brazil, City Hall of Belo Horizonte Summary of the Project
	3	Africa	South Africa, South African Police Service
		Asia & The Pacific	Malaysia, National Productivity Corporation
		Asia & The Pacific	Philippines, City of Naga
2005	1	Asia & The Pacific	India, Bhagidari Cell, Office of the Chief Minister, Government of NCT of Delhi for "Citizen-Government Partnership: Bhagidari in New Delhi"
		Europe & North America	Canada, Vancouver Agreement for "Innovative Partnerships between Government Agencies, and with Community Groups and Business"
	2	Africa	Morocco, Etablissement Autonome de Contrôle et de Coordination des Exportations (EACCE) for "Decentralization and expansion of the quality monitoring process of fruits and vegetables for exportation".
		Europe & North America	Spain, Public Employment Service of Castile and León (Ecyl) for "Modernization Program 2004"
		Latin America	Mexico, Secretaria de Agua, Obra Publica e Infrastructura para el Desarrollo for "El Programa Hidraulico Integral del Estado de Mexico"
	3	Asia & The Pacific	Singapore, Ministry of Trade and Industry for Online Application System for Integrated Services (OASIS)
		Europe & North America	Canada, Industry Canada, Office of Consumer Affairs for "the Canadian Consumer Affairs Gateway (CCIG)"
		Latin America	Mexico, Secretaría de la Función Pública - Unidad de Gobierno Electrónico y Política de Tecnologías de la Información (UGEPTI) for "La Estrategia de Gobierno Digital"
2006	1	Africa	Rwanda, National Examinations Council for "Assessment and Evaluation for Reconciliation"
		Asia & The Pacific	Singapore, Ministry of Manpower, Work Pass Division for "Integrated Work Permit Online Services"
		Europe & North America	The Netherlands, District Water Board for "Rijnland Internet Election System"
	2	Africa	Zambia, District Health Management Board for "Masaiti"
		Asia & The Pacific	India, Government of Karnataka, Revenue Department for "Online delivery of land records"
		Europe & North America	Canada, the Provincial Court of Manitoba for "The Domestic Violence Front-End Project"
		Latin America	Brazil, Secretaria de Desenvolvimento Urbano do Estado da Bahia, Brazil for "Implementation of the Self-Sustainable Sanitation Systems Programme,"
	3	Asia & The Pacific	Australia, Australian Government Department of Industry, Tourism and Resources for "Business Entry Point"
		Europe & North America	Belgium, Crossroads Bank for Social Security for "e-Government Program of the Belgian Social Security"
		Western Asia	United Arab Emirates, Dubai Municipality for "e-Government Municipal Services"
2007	1	Africa	Kenya, Performance Contracts Steering Committee Secretariat for "Performance Contracts"
		Asia	Singapore, Ministry of Finance, Ministry of Manpower and Central Provident Fund Board, Singapore for "Progress Package" (1. place) India, Information Technology and Communications Department, Government of Andhra Pradesh for "e-Procurement Project" (1. place)
		Europe	Austria, Federal Chancellery of Austria for "Electronic law making processes (eLaw)"
		Latin America and the Caribbean	Chile, Dirección de Compras y Contratación Publica
		Western Asia	Azerbaijan, The State Oil Fund of Azerbaijan for "Extractive Industries Transparency Initiative"
		North America and the Pacific	Australia, Australian Public Service Commission for "State of the Service Report"
	2	Africa	South Africa, e'Thekwini Municipality for "e'Thekwini Water & Sanitation Debt Relief Programme" (1. place) Morocco, Arrondissement Agdal, Fez, Morocco for "Fez eGovernment project" (1. place)
		Asia	Republic of Korea, Ministry of Justice for "Korea Immigration Smart Service (KISS)"
		Western Asia	UAE, Dubai Government Excellence Department for "Dubai Government Excellence Program" (1. place) Lebanon, Lebanese Ministry of Finance for "Taxpayer Service" (1. place)
	3	Europe	Switzerland, Statistical Office Canton Zurich, Ministry of Justice and Interior for "e-Government Project (e-voting)"
		North America and the Pacific	Canada, Tli Cho Community Services Agency
2008	1	Africa	Rwanda, Common Development Fund for "Ubudehe"
		Asia and the Pacific	Singapore, Housing and Development Board for "Home Ownership Policy"
		Europe and North America	USA, State of California Superior of America Court for the County of Santa Clara, San Jose, California for "Juvenile Delinquency Domestic Violence and Family Violence Court"
		Latin America	Brazil, Prefeitura Municipal de Santana de Parnaíba, Santana de Parnaíba, São Paulo for "Projeto Oficina-Escola de Artes e Ofícios de Santana de Parnaíba"
	2	Africa	South Africa, Johannesburg for "Phelopepa Health Care Train"
		Asia and the Pacific	Australia, Department of Education for "Job Access"
		Europe and North America	Sweden, City of Umeå for "Library 2007"
		Western Asia	Saudi Arabia, Saudi Arabian Monetary Agency, Riyadh for "SADAD Payment System"
	3	Africa	Tunisia, Direction générale des affaires estudiantines, Tunis for "Orientation universitaire en ligne"
		Asia and the Pacific	India, Government of Nagaland India for "Programme of Communitization of Public Institutions and Services"
		Europe and North America	Spain, Generalitat de Catalunya, Barcelona for "Direcció General de Participació Ciudadana"
		Western Asia	Jordan, the Higher Population Council, Amman for "Family Planning"
2009	1	Asia and the Pacific	Republic of Korea, Office of Waterworks, Seoul Metropolitan Government for "On and Off-Line Real-Time Water Quality Opening Services"
		Europe and North America	Sweden, City of Piteå, Piteå, Norrbotten Region
	2	Africa	Zambia, Itezhi Tezhi District Health Office for "Integrated Mobile Community Voluntary Counseling and Training, and other Health Services"
		Asia and the Pacific	Thailand, Maharaj Nakorn Chiang Mai Hospital, Faculty of Medicine, Chiang Mai University for "Improving Public Medical Care Service through Collaborative Networks"
		Europe and North America	Slovenia, Ministry of Public Administration for "One Stop Shop for Companies (e-VEM)"
		Western Asia	Egypt, University Enrollment Project, Ministry of State for Administrative Development for "e-Tanseek"
	3	Asia and the Pacific	India, Water and Sanitation Management Organization (WASMO) for "Institutionalization of community managed drinking water supply programme and user level water quality monitoring"
	4	Europe and North America	Poland, National School of Public Administration
2010	1	Asia and the Pacific	Republic of Korea, Women Policy Division, Seoul Metropolitan Government for "Women Friendly City Project" (1. place) India, Chief Minister's Office, Government of Gujarat for "817 - State-Wide Attention on Grievances by Application of Technology" (2. place)
		Europe and North America	Germany, Paul-Ehrlich-Institut, Federal Agency for Vaccines and Biomedicines for "Tandem in science, Network for Integration Projects" (1. place) Albania, Public Procurement Agency (2. place)
		Western Asia	Bahrain, e-Government Authority, Kingdom of Bahrain for "National e -Government Portal – Bahrain.bh" (1. place) Saudi Arabia, Public Investment Fund for "SaudiEDI eTrade System and Tabadul Company" (2. place)
	2	Africa	Tunisia, Ministry of the Interior and Local Development for "'Madania' Civil Status System: bringing services closer to citizens" (1. place) Tanzania, Property and Business Formalization Program for "Management of sustainable delivery of secured property rights through empowerment and capacity building of local government" (2. place)
		Asia and the Pacific	Australia, Australian Electoral Commission for "Building Resources in Democracy, Governance and Elections (BRIDGE)" (1. place) Republic of Korea, Welfare Policy Bureau, Seoul Metropolitan Government for "Hope-Plus Account" (2. place)
		Europe and North America	Canada, Revenu Québec for "Ensuring Fiscal Equity (Assurer L’équité Fiscale)" (1. place) Italy, Instituto Nazionale della Previdenza Sociale (INPS) for "INPS Mobile Counter for Disabled and Elderly People" (2. place)
		Western Asia	Saudi Arabia, King Saud University for "Development of e-Education" (1. place) Oman, Ministry of Manpower for "Manpower IT Enabled Service Centre" (2. place)
	3	Asia and the Pacific	Japan, Saga Prefectural Government for "Collaboration Testing" (1. place) Australia, Gold Coast Water, Gold Coast City Council for "Gold Coast Water" (2. place)
		Europe and North America	Italy, Regione Piemonte-Consiglio Regionale del Piemonte for "Youth in the Law Hall (Ragazzi in Aula)"
		Latin America and the Caribbean	Brazil, Guardia da APA do Pratigi- Organización de la Sociedad Civil de Interés Público, Califica for "Support Programme for Integrated and Sustainable Development of the Protected Environment Zone, Pratigi (Programa de Apoyo al Desarrollo Integrado y Sostenible del APA del Pratigi)"
		Western Asia	Lebanon, Lebanese Ministry of Interior and Municipalities for "A new Management Approach to Parliamentary Elections in Lebanon"
	4	Asia and the Pacific	Australia, National Blood Authority for "Knowledge Network" (1. place) Japan, Saga Prefectural Government for "Innovation 'SAGA' Project" (2. place)
		Western Asia	Oman, Ministry of Health for "Hospital Information System" (1. place) Bahrain, eGovernment Authority, Kingdom of Bahrain for "National Enterprise Architecture Framework" (2. place)
2011	1	Africa	South Africa, Electoral Commission of South Africa for "Result Slip Scanning Project"
		Asia and the Pacific	Republic of Korea, Human Resources Development of Service of Korea for "Migrant & Business Friendly Recruitment System" (1. place) Republic of Korea, Seoul Metropolitan Government for "Open Tax Court for Citizens" (2. place)
		Europe and North America	Slovakia, Town Hall of Martin for "Transparent Town" (1. place) Romania, Craiova Local Government for "Cities without Corruption, Cities with Future" (2. place)
		Latin America and the Caribbean	Mexico, Secretaria de la Funcion Publica for "Administrative simplification to improve the efficiency of the government"
		Western Asia	Oman, Ministry of Civil Service for "Central Recruiting System" (1. place) Egypt, General Authority for Government for "Government Procurement Portal" (2. place)
	2	Africa	Tanzania, Property and Business Formalization Program for "Participatory Approaches in Planning and Implementation of Regularization of Informal Settlements" (1. place) Tunisia, Office de la Marine Marchande Et de Ports for "Integrated System to Improve Trade Processes" (2. place)
		Asia and the Pacific	India, Samajik Suvidha Sangam for "Mission Convergence" (1. place) Republic of Korea, Ministry of Public Administration and Security for "24‐Hour E‐Services for the Public" (2. place)
		Europe and North America	Poland, Tax Office in Sierpc for "The Partnership and the Participation of Entrepreneurs, Artisans, Merchants in the Establishment" (1. place) The Netherlands, Ministry of the Interior and Kingdom Relations for "Informal Pro‐Active Approach Model" (2. place)
		Latin America and the Caribbean	Colombia, Departamento de Antioquia for "Programa Alimentario MANA" (1. place) Peru, Programa Revalora Peru for "Programa Revalora Peru" (2. place)
		Western Asia	Oman, Ministry of Education for "Electronic Education Portal" (1. place) Saudi Arabia, Ministry of Communications and Information Technology for "Accelerating E‐Government Adoption for Expanding Access to all Members of Saudi Society" (2. place)
	3	Asia and the Pacific	Republic of Korea, Ministry of Public Administration and Security for "Information Network Village Project" (1. place) Thailand, Royal Irrigation Department for "Participatory Irrigation Management by Civil Society Committee and Water User Organizations" (2. place)
		Europe and North America	Canada, Ministry of Aboriginal Affairs for "Creation of Ministry and Strategic Course of Action for Reconciliation with Aboriginal People" (1. place) Portugal, Agency for the Public Services Reform for "Simplex Public Consultation and Simplex Idea" (2. place)
		Latin America and the Caribbean	Mexico, Secretaria de la Funcion Publica for "Public Call to Identify the Most Useless Process"
	4	Africa	South Africa, Gauteng Department of Agriculture and Rural Development for "Gauteng Integrated Decision Support"
		Asia and the Pacific	Thailand, Revenue Department of Thailand for "Service Excellence Tax Office" (1. place) Republic of Korea, Anti-Corruption and Civil Rights Commission for "E‐People System: Knowledge Management for People's Voice" (2. place)
		Europe and North America	Portugal, Agency for the Public Services Reform for "Common Knowledge Network"
		Latin America and the Caribbean	Brazil, Office of the Comptroller General for "Monitoring of Public Expenditure" (1. place) Dominica, Fisheries Division for "Establishment of Systems for Record‐Keeping of Fish Activities and Improving Coastal Resources Management" (2. place)
		Western Asia	Oman, Information Technology Authority for "Transforming the Society through E‐Oman Strategy" (1. place) United Arab Emirates, Dubai Executive Council ‐ DGEP for "Dubai Knowledge Management Program" (2. place)
	5	Asia and the Pacific	India, Swanchetan Society for Mental Health for "Increasing Access to Justice for Poor Women Who Are Victims of Sexual Atrocities" (1. place) Republic of Korea, Seoul Metropolitan Government for "Self‐Empowerment Program for Runaway Teenage Women" (2. place) Republic of Korea, Gyeonggi Women's Development Centre for "Online Career Coaching Services" (2. place)
		Western Asia	Egypt, Ministry of Health for "Women Health Outreach Program" (1. place) Oman, National Association for Cancer Awareness for "Mobile Mammography Unit" (2. place)
2012	1	Africa	Mauritius, Independent Commission against Corruption (ICAC) for "Preventing and Combating Corruption in the Public Service"
		Asia and the Pacific	Republic of Korea, Anti-corruption and Civil Rights Commission for "The Integrity Assessment" (1. place) Singapore, Building and Construction Authority for "Promoting accountability for procurement of public projects" (2. place)
		Latin America and the Caribbean	Mexico, Ministry of Civil Service for "New Model of control and audit public works" (1. place) Mexico, Ministry of Civil Service for "National Public Procurement System (Sistema Nacional de Contrataciones Públicas)" (2. place)
		Western Asia	Turkey, Ministry of Justice for "SMS Information System" (1. place) Georgia, State Procurement Agency of Georgia for "Georgian Electronic Government Procurement System" (2. place)
	2	Africa	Senegal, GIE GAINDE 2000 for "Electronic Single Window procession of foreign trade and customs formalities" (1. place) Morocco, Group Plan for Retirement Allowance (Régime collectif d’allocation de retraite) for "0-paper" (2. place) Rwanda, Directorate General of Immigration and Emigration (DGIE) for "The use of ICT in improving service delivery in the DGIE" (2. place)
		Asia and the Pacific	India, District Health Society Uttar Pradesh for "Aarogyam" (1. place) Singapore, The Subordinate Courts of Singapore for "Helping to Empower Litigants-in-Person – The Subordinate Courts HELP Centre" (2. place) India, Public Service Delivery Management, Government of Madhya Pradesh for "MP Public Service Delivery Act 2010" (2. place)
		Europe and North America	USA, City of New York 311 Customer Service Center for "NYC311" (1. place) Spain, General Directorate for Administrative Modernization, Procedures and Promotion of E-Government (Dirección General de Modernización Administrativa, Procedimientos e Impulso de la Administración Electrónica) for "Public Service Electronic Access for Citizens (Acceso electrónico completo de los cuidadanos a los servicios públicos)" (2. place)
		Latin America and the Caribbean	Dominican Republic, Essential Drug Program/Logistic Support Central (PROMESE/CAL) for "Institutional Transformation" (1. place) Mexico, National Savings and Financial Services (Banco del Ahorro Nacional y Servicios Financieros S.N.C.) for "Financial Inclusion Project (Proyecto de Inclusión Financiera (PIF))" (2. place) Grenada, Immigration and Passport Department (2. place)
		Western Asia	Lebanon, Cooperative of Government Employees for "Simplify procedures and improve services" (1. place) Georgia, Ministry of Justice for "Public Service Hall" (2. place) Egypt, Ministry of State for Administrative Development (MSAD) for "Democratic Reform Using ICT" (2. place)
	3	Asia and the Pacific	Thailand, Royal Irrigation Department for "Integrated Drought Prevention and Mitigation: The Mae Yom Operation and Maintenance Office" (1. place) Republic of Korea, Ministry of Gender Equality and Family for "Youth Participation Committees" (2. place) Australia, Department of Premier and Cabinet for "South Australia's Strategic Plan Community Engagement" (2. place)
		Europe and North America	Spain, Department of Housing, Construction and Transport, the Basque Government (Departamento de Vivìenda, ObrasPúblicas y Transportes, del Gobierno Vasco) for "Housing – all opinions matter (En Vivìenda, todas las opiniones cuentan)" (1. place) Slovenia, Ministry of Justice and Public Administration for "IT-supported procedure for drafting legislation (ITDL)" (2. place) Canada, Metro Vancouver for "Metro Vancouver's Public Outreach and Engagement Program" (2. place)
		Latin America and the Caribbean	Brazil, Department of Planning and Management of Pernambuco (Secretaria de Planejamento e Gestão do estado Pernambuco) for "Participatory Regional Seminars"
	4	Asia and the Pacific	Malaysia, Implementation Coordination Unit, Prime Minister's Department for "eKasih" (1. place) Republic of Korea, National Science & Technology Commission (NSTC) for "National Science and Technology Information Service (NTIS)" (2. place) Thailand, Rajavithi Hospital for "Preventing Diabetic Blindness" (2. place)
		Europe and North America	Spain, Barcelona Provincial Council (Diputación de Barcelona) for "Territorial Information System for the Network of Open Spaces (Sistema de Información Terrítorìal de la Red de Espacìos Libres)" (1. place) Switzerland, Coordinating Agency for Federal Geographical Information for "geo.admin.ch" (2. place)
		Western Asia	Bahrain, eGovernment Authority - Ministry of Cabinet Affairs for "Integrated Workflow Management System (IWMS)" (1. place) Turkey, Integrated Workflow Management System (IWMS) for "UYAP (National Judiciary Informatics System)" (2. place)
	5	Africa	South Africa, Small Projects Foundation for "Protecting the Futures" (1. place) Ruanda, Rwanda National Police for "Isange One Stop Center" (2. place) Kenya, Ministry of Water and Irrigation for "Gender integration in the water sector" (2. place)
		Europe and North America	Bosnia and Herzegovina, Ministry of Security for "Public participation in peace processes" (1. place) Spain, Bilbao City Council for "Zero Tolerance for Violence against Women" (2. place)
		Latin America and the Caribbean	Brazil, Pernambuco State Secretariat for Women (Secretaria da Mulher do Estado de Pernambuco) for "Chapeu de Palha" (1. place) Mexico, Secretary of Social Development (Secretaria de Desarrollo Social) for "Daycare Program to Support Mothers" (2. place)
		Western Asia	United Arab Emirates, Dubai Police General Headquarters for "Inclusion of Women in the Police Force" (1. place) Oman, Ministry of Health for "Reduce Childhood Mortality Rate: Infants and Children under 5 years of Age" (2. place)
2013	1	Africa	Morocco, Régime collectif d'allocation de retraite (Groupe Caisse de Dépôt et de Gestion) for "Integrity Reinforcement"
		Asia and the Pacific	1st Place, India, Chief Minister's Office(Shri.Oommen Chandy) – Kerala State for "Mass Contact Programme" (MCP). Republic of Korea, Seoul Metropolitan Infrastructure Headquarters for "Anti-Corruption Clean Construction System" (2. place)
		Europe and North America	Italy, National Institute of Social Security, Apulia, Bari for "INPS: Our fight and synergy against corruption" (1. place) Slovenia, Commission for the Prevention of Corruption for "Supervizor" (2. place)
		Western Asia	Oman, State Audit Institution for "Complaints Window" (1. place) Georgia, Civil Service Bureau for "Online Asset Declaration System (OADS)" (2. place)
	2	Africa	South Africa, E'Thekwini Metropolitan Municipality Water and Sanitation Services for "Communal Ablution Blocks for Informal Settlements" (1. place) Nigeria, Federal Capital Territory Administration, Abuja, Nigeria for "Federal Capital Territory Administration Mobile Integrated Primary Health Care Service Delivery 'MAILAFIYA'" (2. place)
		Asia and the Pacific	Thailand, Rajanagarindra Institute of Child Development - Ministry of Public Health for "Child First – Work Together (CF-WT)" (1. place) India, District Administration, Dhanbad for "SWAVALAMBAN" (2. place)
		Europe and North America	Spain, AENA (Aena Aeropuertos Españoles y Navegación Aérea) for "Servicio de atención a Personas con Movilidad Reducida - PMR- en los aeropuertos de la red" (1. place) Spain, Fundación BiscayTIK for "Modernización de la administración local a través del uso de las Nuevas Tecnologías" (2. place) USA, Philadelphia Department of Human Services for "Improving Outcomes for Children" (2. place)
		Latin America and the Caribbean	Peru, Registro Nacional de Identificación y Estado Civil (RENIEC) for "Documento Nacional de Identidad (DNI) De Menores Y Su impacto En El Ejercicio De Los Derechos Humanos" (1. place) Brazil, Government of the State of Pernambuco for "Pacto Pela Vida-PPV" (2. place) Mexico, Procuraduría for "Fomento a la Inversión en la Propiedad Rural/FIPP" (2. place)
		Western Asia	Oman, Ministry of Regional Municipalities and Water Resources for "INJAZ Hall" (1. place) United Arab Emirates, Dubai Police General Headquarters for "Customer Service Management" (2. place)
	3	Asia and the Pacific	Republic of Korea, Seoul Metropolitan Government for "Seoul Welfare Standards enabled by and for the Citizens of Seoul" (1. place) Republic of Korea, Seoul Metropolitan Government for "Eco-mileage, a program to engage citizens in GHG reduction" (2. place)
		Europe and North America	Moldova, State Chancellery of the Republic of Moldova for "Increased transparency in the decision-making process"
		Latin America and the Caribbean	Brazil, Governo do Estado do Rio Grande do Sul for "Sistema Estadual de Participação Popular e Cidadã/SISPARCI"
		Western Asia	Egypt, Information Center for "Egypt's ICT Indicators Portal"
	4	Africa	Nigeria, Galaxy Backbone for "1-GOV.net" (1. place) Botswana, Ministry of Local Government and Rural Development for "Food Coupon System" (2. place) Morocco, Agence Urbaine D'essaouira for "QR Codes" (2. place)
		Asia and the Pacific	Republic of Korea, Ministry of Strategy and Finance for "DBAS: Korea's Integrated Financial Management Information System" (1. place) Republic of Korea, Ministry of Security and Public Administration for "Government Wide Enterprise Architecture in Korea (GEA)" (2. place) Singapore, National Environment Agency for "Co-creation of creative solutions through eGov initiatives" (2. place)
		Europe and North America	Slovenia, Ministry of the Interior and Public Administration for "Reusable IT building blocks for electronic data exchange - implementation for e-Social Security" (1. place) Spain, Instituto Geográfico Nacional for "Plan Nacional de Obsevación del Territorio (PNOT)" (2. place)
		Latin America and the Caribbean	Trinidad and Tobago, Ministry of Trade, Industry and Investment for "TTBIZLink"
		Western Asia	United Arab Emirates, Abu Dhabi Government Systems & Information Centre for "Abu Dhabi Government Contact Centre" (1. place) Bahrain, eGovernment Authority for "Integrated Service Delivery Platform (ISDP)" (2. place) United Arab Emirates, Dubai eGovernment for "Dubai eGovernment Electronic Shared Services (ESS)" (2. place)
	5	Africa	Morocco, La DFCAT du Ministère de l’Intérieur for "L'Intégration de l'Approche Genre dans le Plan Stratégique de Formation, de Renforcement des Capacités, de Développement des Compétences et de Mise en Réseau au profit des Collectivités Territoriales du Maroc" (1. place) Ethiopia, Ethiopian Civil Service University for "Creating Access to Education for Disadvantaged Female Civil Servants (AEDFCS, ASSNFS, and IPFA)" (2. place) Kenya, Nikumbuke-Health by Motorbike for "Gender and Health" (2. place)
		Asia and the Pacific	Pakistan, Gender Unit Department of Labour Punjab for "GRLI" (1. place) India, Dept. of Cottage and Rural Industries for "GRAAMIN HAAT" (2. place) Republic of Korea, Seoul Metropolitan Government for "Initiative for Women of Single-Person Household" (2. place)
		Europe and North America	Germany, Bundesministerium für Familie, Senioren, Frauen und Jugend for "Aktionsprogramm Perspektive Wiedereinstieg (PWE)" (1. place) Italy, Ministry of Economy and Finance for "Mini*Midi*Mef (MMM)" (2. place)
		Latin America and the Caribbean	Ecuador, Ministerio de Finanzas Ecuador for "Catalogo Orientador de Gastos Politicas de Equidad de Genero"
		Western Asia	Egypt, Ministry of Health for "Multidisciplinary Breast Cancer Clinic – Women's Health Outreach Program" (1. place) Jordan, Center for Integrated Services against Domestic Violence for "Integrated Services Center against Domestic Violence/Family Reconciliation" (2. place)
2014	1	Africa	South Africa, Rég Gauteng Department of Education for "Secondary School Improvement Programme (SSIP)" (1. place) Cameroon, Municipality of Bangangte for "Sustainable Work in the Water Sector and Sanitation" (2. place)
		Asia and the Pacific	Singapore, Alexandra Health System for "Ageing-In-Place Programme"
		Europe and North America	Austria, Federal Chancellery of the Republic of Austria for "Open Government Data - Data.gv.at" (1. place) Spain, Ministry of Finance and Public Administration for "Data Intermediation Platform" (2. place)
		Western Asia	Turkey, Ankara Metropolitan Municipality for "Center of Children Working in Ankara Streets" (1. place) Bahrain, Ministry of Health for "National Health Information System (I-Seha)" (2. place)
	2	Asia and the Pacific	Thailand, Department of Disease Control, Ministry of Public Health for "Integrating Network and Community Participation for Effective Malaria Management in Tha Song Yang Di" (1. place) Republic of Korea, Changwon City for "Building the Best Neighborhood Project" (2. place)
		Latin America and the Caribbean	Brazil, Ministry of Planning, Budgeting and Management & Secretariat-General of the Presidency for "Inter-council Forum"
	3	Asia and the Pacific	Republic of Korea, Korea Health and Welfare Information Service (KHWIS) for "Social Security Information System (SSIS)" (1. place) India, Department of Electronics and Information Technology for "Mobile Seva" (2. place)
		Latin America and the Caribbean	Uruguay, National Civil Service Bureau for "Uruguay Competes" (1. place) Brazil, Rio Grande do Sul State Government for "Transparency and Citizens' Access to Information" (2. place)
		Western Asia	Bahrain, eGovernment Authority for "The National Contact Center"
	4	Africa	Morocco, Ministry of Economy and Finance for "Gender Responsive Budgeting in Morocco"
		Asia and the Pacific	Thailand, Khon Kaen Hospital for "One Stop Crisis Centre"
		Latin America and the Caribbean	Brazil, State Health Secretariat of Pernambuco for "Mae Coruja Program"
		Western Asia	Oman, Ministry of Health for "Omani Nurse-Midwife"
2015	1	Africa	Kenya, Ministry of Devolution and Planning for "Huduma Kenya Programme (HKP)" (1. place) Ethiopia, Ministry of Urban Development, Housing and Construction for "Integrated Housing and Development Programme (IHDP)" (2. place)
		Asia and the Pacific	India, District Magistrate, Nadia, West Bengal - Sabar Shouchagar for "Sabar Shouchagar" (1. place) Republic of Korea, Songpa-gu for "Songpa Solar Nanum Power Plant" (1. place) Indonesia, Aceh Singkil Regency for "Fostering Partnership between Traditional Birth Attendants and Midwives to Reduce Maternal and Infancy's Mortality" (2. place) Philippines, City of mandaluyong – Project TEACH for "Project Therapy, Education, Assimilation of Children with Handicap (TEACH)" (2. place)
		Latin America and the Caribbean	Mexico, Instituto Nacional del Derecho de Autor for "Express Autor" (1. place) Brazil, Secretary of Finance – State of Bahia/PPP Unit for "Suburbio Hospital PPP" (2. place)
		Western Asia	Azerbaijan, ASAN Service run by the State Agency for Public Service and Social Innovations under the President for "ASAN Service" (1. place) Turkey, Prime Ministry, Disaster and Emergency Management Authority (AFAD) for "The Sheltering Centre Management System (AFKEN)" (2. place)
	2	Europe and North America	Spain, Basque Government President's Office, Irekia - Open Government for "Irekia"
	3	Asia and the Pacific	Singapore, Ministry of Manpower and Central Provident Fund Board for "WorkRight Initiative" (1. place) Thailand, Holistic School in Hospital, Queen Sirikit National Institute of Child Health, Department of Medical Service, Ministry of Public Health for" Holistic School in Hospital Initiative (HSH)" (1. place) Indonesia, Sragen Regency for "Integrated Service Unit on Poverty Relief" (2. place)
		Europe and North America	Estonia, Centre of Registers and Information Systems for "e-Business Register" (1. place) Latvia, Rural Support Service for "Electronic Application System" (2. place)
		Latin America and the Caribbean	Ecuador, Secretaría Nacional de Planificación y Desarrollo – Senplades for "Sistema Nacional de Información (SNI)"
		Western Asia	United Arab Emirates, Emirates Identity Authority for "National Validation Gateway"
	4	Asia and the Pacific	Republic of Korea, Seoul Metropolitan Government for" Fighting Violence against Women: Making Seoul a Safer City for Women" (1. place) Thailand, Khon Kaen Hospital for "Fast-track Service for High-risk Pregnancies" (2. place)
		Europe and North America	Spain, Emakunde - Instituto Vasco de la Mujer for "Implantación de la Ley Vasca para la Igualdad de Mujeres y Hombres" (1. place) France, Ministère de la Décentralisation et de la Fonction Publique for "Dispositif de Nominations Équilibrées dans L’encadrement Supérieur de la Fonction Publique" (2. place)
2016			UNPS Forum
2017	1	Asia and the Pacific	India, Government of West Bengal for "Kanyashree Prakalpa (KP)"
		Latin America and the Caribbean	Argentina, Municipalidad de la ciudad Santa Fe for "Jardines Municipales de la ciudad de Santa Fe"
		Western Europe and Others	United Kingdom, Avon and Somerset Constabulary for "Senior Citizen Liaison Team (SCLT)"
	2	Latin America and the Caribbean	Colombia, Contraloría General de Medellín for "School Comptrollership"
		Asia and the Pacific	Australia, Department of the Premier and Cabinet, Government of South Australia for "Fund My Community"
	3	Asia and the Pacific	Mongolia, National Center for Maternal and Child Health for "Telemedicine Support for Maternal and Newborn Health"
		Eastern Europe	Armenia, National Center for Aids Prevention of the Ministry of Health for "Elimination of Mother-to-Child Transmission of HIV in Armenia (EMTCT)"
		Latin America and the Caribbean	Ecuador, Ministerio de Salud Publica del Ecuador for "Trabajo en Redes Integradas de Salud"
2018	1	Asia and the Pacific	Indonesia for "Reducing Malaria Cases Trough Early Diagnosis and Treatment (EDAT)"
		Western Europe and Others	Austria for "Talents for Austria"
	2	Asia and the Pacific	Republic of Korea for "Tax Administration Division"
		Latin America and the Caribbean	Colombia for "Cambia Tu Mente...Construye Paz (Change your mind … Build Peace)"
		Western Europe and Others	Spain for "Citizen Participation Project"
	3	Africa	Kenya for "Promoting Gender responsive public service to achieve the SDGs"
		Asia and the Pacific	Thailand for "Integrated approach of comprehensive cervical cancer control"
		Western Europe and Others	Switzerland for "Switzerland Advancing Gender Equal Pay SAGE"

== See also ==
- United Nations
- United Nations Public Administration Network
- UN Public Service Day
