= Online Business Licensing System =

Singapore government portal

Online Business Licensing Service (OBLS) is a one-stop portal for applying for the required Singapore government licences in a single online transaction. The service routes all applications to various government agency for processing.

The World Bank has ranked Singapore first in the Ease of Doing Business Index. The OBLS system contributes to this ranking.

== History ==
The system was first conceived by the Pro-Enterprise Panel, a joint public-private sector panel chaired by the Head of Civil Service, Singapore. The panel received business feedback to cut red-tape in making it easy to start businesses in Singapore.

Small and medium enterprises were the main target of the OBLS project due to their large number. This group were generally unhappy with the costs and complexities of the licensing process.

OBLS was also a key project under the Singapore e-Government Action Plan II.

== Scope ==
260 business licences that are issued by more than 30 government agencies in Singapore are found in the OBLS. More than 80% of start-up businesses in Singapore are served by OBLS without having to visit Government counters. The system also offers Update, Renewal and Termination services for 65 licences.

== Features ==
1. Search for the licences that may be needed
2. Apply for multiple licences at once using the integrated form
3. Update particulars on existing licence
4. Renew existing licences that are expiring soon
5. Terminate licences that are no longer required
6. Pay for multiple licences via one consolidated transaction

== Achievements ==
As of 1 October 2005, the average license processing time for all new applications including those not handled by OBLS was reduced from 21 to 8 days as a result of the re-engineering exercise and OBLS implementation. 85 licenses were processed in less than a week. Of these, 43 were processed in less than three days. Based on the cost-benefit analysis done at 31 December 2006, businesses have benefited from the OBLS project with an estimated cost savings of US$27 million (since the pilot launch in January 2004 ). The cost savings were derived from the reduction in the amount of licence fees, reduction in the processing time of licences and the time-savings by applicants who now do not need to travel and queue up physically and complete multiple application forms that ask for similar information. Users have given the OBLS an 80% positive feedback rating.

== Awards ==
OBLS won the following awards:

- 2005 United Nations Public Service Awards
- ZDNet Asia Smart50 Award 2006
- 2007 Computerworld Honors Program
- MIS Asia IT Excellence Award 2007
