= United Nations Public Service Day =

United Nations observance

The United Nations Public Service Day is celebrated on June 23 of every year. The UN Public Service Day was designated by the United Nations General Assembly's resolution A/RES/57/277, adopted on December 20th, 2002, to “celebrate the value and virtue of public service to the community”. The United Nations Economic and Social Council established that the United Nations Public Service Awards be bestowed on Public Service Day for contributions made to the cause of enhancing the role, prestige, and visibility of public service.
