= Executive Order 14063 =

Executive order signed by U.S. President Joe Biden

- "Use of Project Labor Agreements for Federal Construction Projects"
- Type: Executive order
- Number: 14063
- President: Joe Biden
- Signed: February 4, 2022

Federal Register details
- Federal Register document number: 2022-02869
- Publication date: February 4, 2022

Summary
- Requiring project labor agreements on federal construction projects.

Executive Order 14063, officially titled Use of Project Labor Agreements for Federal Construction Projects, was signed on February 4, 2022, and is the 79th executive order signed by U.S. President Joe Biden. The telos of the order is to require project labor agreements on federal construction projects.

== Provisions ==
This executive order mandates project labor agreements on federal construction projects worth more than $35 million, which will affect $262 billion in federal construction contracts and improve job quality for roughly 200,000 people. Project labor agreements (PLAs) are commonly used in the construction industry to define the terms of employment for all project workers. PLAs typically stipulate workers' pay and benefits, as well as rules requiring contractors to hire workers through union hiring systems, otherwise form a unionized workforce, or develop procedures for resolving employment issues. PLAs frequently contain wording that prohibits workers from striking during the project while simultaneously prohibiting employers from locking out workers. PLAs are useful tools for lowering construction costs, assuring timely completion of projects, and ensuring that all workers are paid fairly. PLAs also aid in the preservation of worker health and safety while also giving a unique opportunity for workforce development. These agreements can be established to engage local communities, offer jobs for disadvantaged groups, and provide apprentices with valuable experience.

The order underscores President Biden's focus on increasing efficiency, lowering costs, boosting worker well-being, and involving local communities in large-scale federal initiatives. PLAs can help promote the shift to a clean energy economy by creating green jobs, training workers in sustainable construction practices, and reinvesting in local communities. PLAs can help to bolster initiatives to upgrade internet and water systems while also ensuring high labor standards.

== See also ==
- List of executive actions by Joe Biden
