= Strategic Actions for a Just Economy =

- Abbreviation: SAJE
- Formation: 1996; 30 years ago
- Founder: Gilda Haas
- Purpose: "Our mission is to change public and corporate policy in a manner that provides concrete economic benefits to working class people, increases the economic rights of working class people, and builds leadership through a movement for economic justice; and in the process creating sustainable models of economic democracy."
- Location: 152 W. 32nd St Los Angeles, California, 90007, U.S.
- Executive Director: Cynthia Strathmann PhD
- Website: www.saje.net

Strategic Actions for a Just Economy (SAJE) is a non-profit economic justice organization based in Los Angeles. It was founded in 1996 by Gilda Haas and Kent Wong and is currently led by Executive Director Cynthia Strathmann PhD.

== Community Benefits Agreements ==
As a founding convening organization of the United Neighbors in Defense Against Displacement Coalition (UNIDAD)--formerly known as the Coalition for a Responsible USC and the Figueroa Corridor Coalition for Economic Justice--SAJE has fought for the adoption community benefits agreements (CBA) that ensure new developments benefit existing working-class residents in impacted neighborhoods. These agreements have included provisions for affordable housing funding, local targeted hiring, low-income health clinics, and set asides for low and extremely-low income housing.

Notable projects with CBAs involving SAJE:

- Staples Center/LA Live
- GH Palmer Lorenzo Project
- University of Southern California University Village
- Grand Metropolitan Development

== Other projects ==
- Secured affordable housing and renovations to buildings owned by a slum lord in South Los Angeles
- Developed a pilot program to reduce high check cashing fees for welfare recipients with Washington Mutual Bank.
- Co-organized the Annual South Los Angeles Health and Human Rights Conference to address community health issues.

== Housing policy & retracted housing vacancy report ==
In 2019, researchers working for SAJE published a report claiming that there were more vacant homes in Los Angeles than homeless people. After questions about the report's methodology, the report was removed from the internet.

SAJE co-signed a letter opposing SB 79.
