= Saje Natural Wellness =

Canadian retailer

- Company type: Private
- Industry: Retail
- Founded: 1992; 34 years ago
- Founders: Kate Ross LeBlanc; Jean-Pierre LeBlanc
- Headquarters: Vancouver, British Columbia, Canada
- Number of locations: 52 (Canada); 19 (United States)
- Website: saje.com

Saje Natural Wellness is a Canadian retailer of private-label essential oils and skin care products. The company was founded in 1992 by Kate and Jean-Pierre LeBlanc in Lonsdale Quay, Vancouver, British Columbia. In 2016, the company opened their first international location in California. The company is currently headquartered in the Vancouver neighborhood of Mount Pleasant.
