= Giuseppina Tuissi =

Italian partisan and communist (1923–1945)

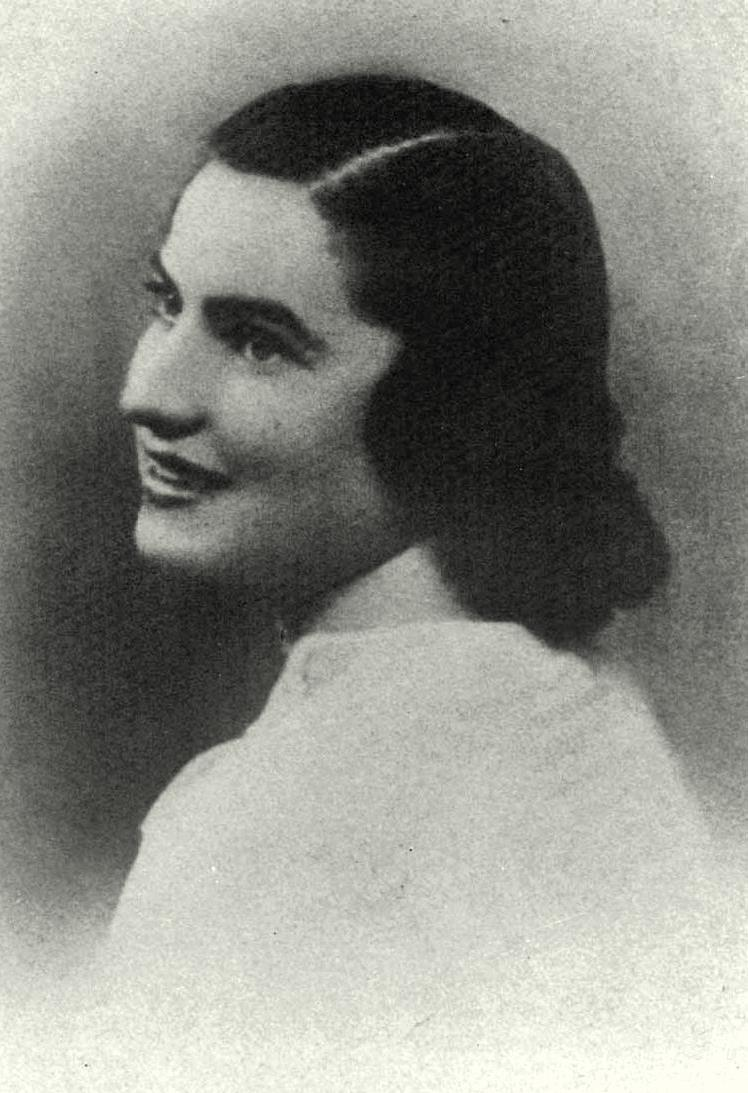
- Born: 23 June 1923; Abbiategrasso, Italy
- Died: 23 June 1945 (aged 22); Cernobbio, Italy
- Cause of death: killed (uncertain)
- Occupation(s): Laborer, Italian resistance member

External image
- Portrait of Giuseppina Tuissi at itwiki

Giuseppina Tuissi, better known as Gianna (also La Staffetta Gianna; 23 June 1923 – 23 June 1945) was an Italian communist and partisan during World War II. She was part of the 52nd Brigata Garibaldi "Luigi Clerici". From September 1944, she was a collaborator of the partisan Luigi Canali (known as the captain Neri) and, with him, had an important role in the arrest and the execution of Benito Mussolini and Clara Petacci.

== Early life ==
Giuseppina was born in 1923 in Abbiategrasso, in the Province of Milan. She lived and worked as labourer in Baggio, a Milan suburb.

== Partisan ==
In 1943, she started serving as a partisan courier, using the pseudonym "Gianna". On 6 January 1945 she was arrested with Canali in Lezzeno by the members of the XI Black Brigade "Cesare Rodini" and tortured for 23 days. After this period, she was transferred to SS headquarters in Monza by a Gestapo officer, Captain Vernig, who pitied her condition and was impressed by her bravery. On 12 March, she was released. Refusing an escape route to Switzerland, she continued participating in the partisan struggle in northern Lombardy. She and Neri were present during the arrest of Mussolini and Petacci, on 27 April near Dongo; and to their execution, the day after, in Giulino.

She was suspected of betrayal and having revealed the names of partisans during her detention. She was arrested in Baggio on 29 April and detained until 9 May. She was interrogated by Pietro Vergani, regional commander of the Garibaldi Brigades and PCI member.

At the end of May 1945. she went to Milan with Luigi's sister Alice Canali, to learn more about his death. Despite threats, she continued to ask questions, threatening to reveal what she learned. In June, she met Ferruccio Lanfranchi, editor of the Corriere d'Informazione, that investigated Mussolini's death. Feeling abandoned by her comrades, she disappeared on 23 June 1945, on her 22nd birthday. It is presumed she was killed and her body thrown into Lake Como near Cernobbio.

Her death and those of Neri and other partisans in the late spring of 1945, represent an unresolved mystery of the Italian resistance history. In 1957 Dante Gorreri, PCI secretary of Como, and Pietro Vergani, were charged for the murder as instigators; Dionisio Gambaruto and Maurizio Bernasconi as executors. The trial, held in Padua, was not completed because of a series of procedural impediments.

== Literature ==
- Fabio Andriola: "Appuntamento sul lago". Milan, SugarCo, 1996. ISBN 88-7198-022-0
- Giorgio Cavalleri: "Ombre sul Lago" Varese, Arterigere [1995], 2007. ISBN 88-89666-21-8
- Giorgio Cavalleri and Franco Giannantoni: "«Gianna» e «Neri» fra speculazioni e silenzi". Varese, Arterigere, 2002
- Roberto Festorazzi: "I veleni di Dongo ovvero gli spettri della Resistenza". il Minotauro, 2004. ISBN 88-8073-086-X
- Luciano Garibaldi: "La pista inglese. Chi uccise Mussolini e la Petacci?". Ares, 2002. ISBN 88-8155-238-8
- Franco Giannantoni: "«Gianna» e «Neri»: vita e morte di due partigiani comunisti". Milan, Mursia, 1992. ISBN 88-425-1226-5
- Franco Giannantoni: "L'ombra degli americani sulla Resistenza al confine tra Italia e Svizzera". Varese, Arterigere, 2007. ISBN 88-89666-16-1
- Urbano Lazzaro: "Dongo: mezzo secolo di menzogne". Milan, Mondadori, 1993. ISBN 88-04-36762-8
- Vittorio Roncacci: "La calma apparente del lago. Como e il Comasco tra guerra e guerra civile 1940-1945". Varese, Macchione, 2003. ISBN 88-8340-164-6
