= Local hiring =

Practice of hiring people who live close to the place of work

Local hiring is a goal or requirement to hire people who live close to the place of work. This aim is often more specifically structured as a requirement for contractors awarded certain types of publicly funded projects to recruit a certain proportion of the people working on the project from a particular area.

== Motive ==
Proponents of local hiring ordinances claim the practice:

- ensures that tax dollars are invested back into the local economy
- preserves local employment opportunities in construction
- reduces the environmental impact of commuting
- fosters community involvement

Opponents of local hiring ordinances point to economic factors and public policy argumentative:

- a restricted pool of labor will result in higher costs
- municipal cost of oversight detracts from public benefit
- constraints of local hire will drive prices up, as contractors will factor in compliance costs and/or choose to not bid
- the extent to which local hiring provides opportunities for local workers may also restrict opportunities for other local workers outside of their local catchment area

== Benefits ==
The environmental benefit of local hiring comes principally because employing a greater percentage of local workers leads to shorter commutes and a greater ability to walk, bike, and take public transit to work. This results in reductions in air pollution, including greenhouse gases.

Local hiring is an aspect of the relocalization movement. Mandating that contractors hire locally means residents can work closer to home, spending less time traveling to and from their jobs. As Robert D. Putnam notes in Bowling Alone: The Collapse and Revival of American Community, each additional ten minutes spent commuting leads to a ten percent decline in all areas of civic engagement. Therefore, local hiring may be one tool municipalities can use to increase community involvement. The other positive aspects that comes with local hiring is the fact that the people who shall be hired have great knowledge of the local culture and are more experienced on the business practices of the local area. this is an implication that it will be easy to conduct business locally.

The City and County of San Francisco Board of Supervisors passed the strongest local hiring ordinance in the United States on December 14, 2010. This legislation, sponsored by Supervisor John Avalos, requires 20% of construction workers on city projects in 2011–12 to live locally, rising to 50% by 2017. 50% of apprentices on these projects must live locally. The ordinance has per-trade requirements set at half the overall level (e.g. by 2017, 25% of workers in any trade must live locally). The local hire requirement replaced a previous goal-based approach that had proved ineffective, with only 20% of hours on city project being worked by San Francisco residents in the period July 2009 to late 2010. The new ordinance became law on March 25, 2011.

Oftentimes, companies will set up a stand at a local university to make themselves for accessible to the community and easier to have a face-to-face meeting to determine the right candidate. They could have two or, possibly, three representatives willing to speak to whoever comes to the table. The company often offers corporate giveaway items (aka. "Swag") to the individual they talk to or anyone who appears interested in their company. The United States Office of Personnel Management says, "Swag items are commonly distributed to all employees or participants at a particular event for the sole purpose of promoting or advertising the agency or organization."

== See also ==
- Hiring hall
