= Vancouver Agreement =

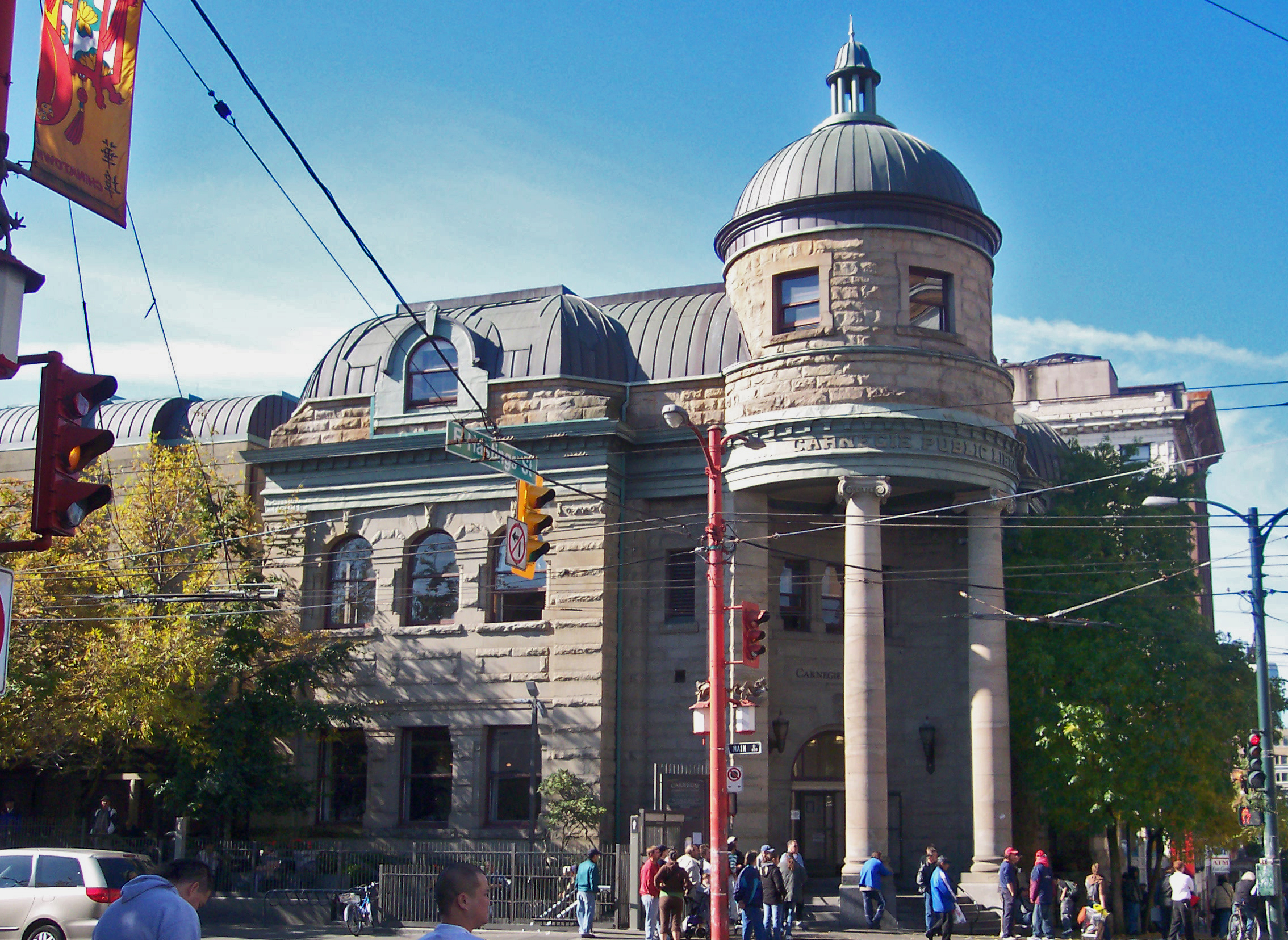
The corner of Main and Hastings, in front of the Carnegie Centre, was physically redesigned under the Vancouver Agreement to help deter open drug dealing.

The Vancouver Agreement was an initiative undertaken jointly by the governments of Canada, British Columbia, and the City of Vancouver, to develop and revitalize Vancouver, and in particular its Downtown Eastside, through collaboration between projects and ministries at all three levels of government, as well as community and business groups. While other parts of the city are also targeted by the initiative, its Downtown Eastside area is notorious across Canada for its deep problems with poverty, substance abuse, prostitution, violent crime and homelessness, and the agreement’s stated goals include promoting the health, safety and economic and social well being of the neighbourhood. The initial five-year agreement began in March, 2000 and expired in March, 2010.

On May 6, 2005, the Vancouver Agreement received the United Nations Public Service Award for "Improving transparency, accountability and responsiveness in the public service". On September 1, 2004, it received the Institute of Public Administration of Canada's Innovative Management Award.

== Public safety ==
The initiative's programs aimed at public safety include the Enhanced Enforcement Initiative, which co-ordinates efforts between the Vancouver Police Department, the BC Liquor Control and Licensing Branch, and Citizenship and Immigration Canada to target businesses that either have ties to organized crime or exploit individuals who are vulnerable due to mental illness or addiction. Also developed under the agreement is the Vancouver Police Department's Keep Exploited Youth Safe program, designed to protect sex trade workers from violent crime, which has been adopted by many other police departments across Canada.

Physical redesign of public spaces has also been part of the initiative's strategy for public safety and security. The Carrall Street Greenway, built between Gastown and Chinatown, was meant to deter crime by creating a more open and attractive space. The corner of Hastings and Main, traditionally the site of a major open drug market, has also been redesigned to discourage illicit use.

== Housing ==
The Vancouver Agreement also supports programs to improve the quality and availability of housing on the Downtown Eastside. The initiative's policy is to find ways of improving the quality of housing without making it inaccessible to the low-income residents who have traditionally been attracted to the DTES for low rents. The Single Room Occupancy project, a collaboration of Canada Mortgage and Housing Corporation, BC Housing and the City of Vancouver Housing Centre, has refurbished DTES hotels to ensure livable conditions for at-risk tenants. The repurposed Woodward's building, which will include 200 units of social housing alongside market-price condos and commercial office and retail space, is another Vancouver Agreement project.
