= June 9 =

June 9 this year in various calendars
- Tuesday, 9 June 2026
Akan	Monobene
Armenian	24 Margach 1475
Aztec	Teotleco 10, 8 Tecpatl
Babylonian	22 Ayaru, 2337 SE
Balinese pawukon	Menga, Kajeng, Laba, Paing, Maulu, Anggara of Sungsang, Indra, Dadi, Suka
Bengali	26 Joishtho, BS 1433
Chinese	Yang Wood Tiger・Encampment Mansion; Fire Horse Year, Month 4, Day 24 (Mangzhong, 12 days until Xiazhi)
Common Era	9 June 2026 CE
Coptic	2 Paoni, AM 1742
Egyptian	24 Phaophi, 2775 NE
Ethiopian	2 Sanē, 2018 Amätä Məhrät
French Republican	Décade III, Primidi de Prairial de l'Année 234 de la République
Gregorian	9 June, AD 2026
Hebrew	24 Sivan, AM 5786
Hindu	Uttarabhādrapada・Prīti; Solar: 26 Jyeṣṭha, 1948 SE; Lunisolar: Navamī, Kṛishna pakṣa of Adhika Jyeṣṭha, 2083 VE; Rāudra・5127 KY・1,872,735
Icelandic	Þriðjudagur, 18 Skerpla 2026
Islamic	23 Dhu al-Hijjah, AH 1447 (using tabular method)
ISO week date	2026-W24-2
Japanese	24 Uzuki, Reiwa 8 (Bōshu, 12 days until Geshi)
Julian	27 May, AD 2026 (AM 7534)
Julian day	2461201
Korean	24 Baemdal, 4359 DE
Maya	13.0.13.11.18; 11 Zotz, 8 Etznab
Roman	ante diem VI Kalendas Iunias, MMDCCLXXIX AUC
Solar Hijri	19 Khordad, SH 1405
Tibetan	24 sa ga, me pho rta 2153 or 1772 or 1000

<<	June					>>
Su	Mo	Tu	We	Th	Fr	Sa
	1	2	3	4	5	6
7	8	9	10	11	12	13
14	15	16	17	18	19	20
21	22	23	24	25	26	27
28	29	30
2026

June 9 in recent years
2026 (Tuesday)
2025 (Monday)
2024 (Sunday)
2023 (Friday)
2022 (Thursday)
2021 (Wednesday)
2020 (Tuesday)
2019 (Sunday)
2018 (Saturday)
2017 (Friday)

June 9 is the 160th day of the year (161st in leap years) in the Gregorian calendar; 205 days remain until the end of the year.

== Events ==
=== Pre-1600 ===
- 411 BC – The Athenian coup succeeds, forming a short-lived oligarchy.
- 53 – The Roman emperor Nero marries Claudia Octavia.
- 68 – Nero dies by suicide after quoting Vergil's Aeneid, thus ending the Julio-Claudian dynasty and starting the civil war known as the Year of the Four Emperors.
- 721 – Odo of Aquitaine defeats the Moors in the Battle of Toulouse.
- 747 – Abbasid Revolution: Abu Muslim Khorasani begins an open revolt against Umayyad rule, which is carried out under the sign of the Black Standard.
- 1311 – Duccio's Maestà, a seminal artwork of the early Italian Renaissance, is unveiled and installed in Siena Cathedral in Siena, Italy.
- 1523 – The Parisian Faculty of Theology fines Simon de Colines for publishing the Biblical commentary Commentarii initiatorii in quatuor Evangelia by Jacques Lefèvre d'Étaples.
- 1534 – Jacques Cartier is the first European to describe and map the Saint Lawrence River.

=== 1601–1900 ===
- 1732 – James Oglethorpe is granted a royal charter for the colony of the future U.S. state of Georgia.
- 1772 – The British schooner Gaspee is burned in Narragansett Bay, Rhode Island.
- 1798 – Irish Rebellion of 1798: Battles of Arklow and Saintfield.
- 1815 – End of the Congress of Vienna: The new European political situation is set.
- 1856 – Five hundred Mormons leave Iowa City, Iowa for the Mormon Trail.
- 1861 – The Beyoglu Protocol turns the district of Mount Lebanon into an autonomous region within the Ottoman Empire and grants the Christians more power over the Druze.
- 1862 – American Civil War: Stonewall Jackson concludes his successful Shenandoah Valley Campaign with a victory in the Battle of Port Republic.
- 1863 – American Civil War: The Battle of Brandy Station in Virginia, the largest cavalry battle on American soil, ends Confederate cavalry dominance in the eastern theater.
- 1885 – Treaty of Tientsin is signed to end the Sino-French War, with China eventually giving up Tonkin and Annam – most of present-day Vietnam – to France.
- 1900 – Indian nationalist Birsa Munda dies of cholera in a British prison.

=== 1901–present ===
- 1915 – William Jennings Bryan resigns as Woodrow Wilson's Secretary of State over a disagreement regarding the United States' handling of the sinking of the RMS Lusitania.
- 1922 – Åland's Regional Assembly convenes for its first plenary session in Mariehamn, Åland; today, the day is celebrated as Self-Government Day of Åland.
- 1923 – Bulgaria's military takes over the government in a coup.
- 1928 – Charles Kingsford Smith completes the first trans-Pacific flight in a Fokker Trimotor monoplane, the Southern Cross.
- 1930 – A Chicago Tribune reporter, Jake Lingle, is killed during rush hour at the Illinois Central train station by Leo Vincent Brothers, allegedly over a $100,000 gambling debt owed to Al Capone.
- 1944 – World War II: Ninety-nine civilians are hanged from lampposts and balconies by German troops in Tulle, France, in reprisal for maquisards attacks.
- 1944 – World War II: The Soviet Union invades East Karelia and the previously Finnish part of Karelia, occupied by Finland since 1941.
- 1948 – Foundation of the International Council on Archives under the auspices of the UNESCO.
- 1953 – The Flint–Worcester tornado outbreak sequence kills 94 people in Massachusetts.
- 1954 – Joseph N. Welch, special counsel for the United States Army, lashes out at Senator Joseph McCarthy during the Army–McCarthy hearings, giving McCarthy the famous rebuke, "You've done enough. Have you no sense of decency, sir, at long last? Have you left no sense of decency?"
- 1957 – First ascent of Broad Peak by Fritz Wintersteller, Marcus Schmuck, Kurt Diemberger, and Hermann Buhl.
- 1958 – Aeroflot Flight 105 crashes on approach to Magdan-13 Airport, killing 24.
- 1959 – The USS George Washington is launched. It is the first nuclear-powered ballistic missile submarine.
- 1965 – The civilian Prime Minister of South Vietnam, Phan Huy Quát, resigns after being unable to work with a junta led by Nguyễn Cao Kỳ.
- 1965 – Vietnam War: The Viet Cong commences combat with the Army of the Republic of Vietnam in the Battle of Đồng Xoài, one of the largest battles in the war.
- 1967 – Six-Day War: Israel captures the Golan Heights from Syria.
- 1968 – U.S. President Lyndon B. Johnson declares a national day of mourning following the assassination of Senator Robert F. Kennedy.
- 1972 – Severe rainfall causes a dam in the Black Hills of South Dakota to burst, creating a flood that kills 238 people and causes $160 million in damage.
- 1973 – In horse racing, Secretariat wins the U.S. Triple Crown.
- 1978 – The Church of Jesus Christ of Latter-day Saints opens its priesthood to "all worthy men", ending a 148-year-old policy of excluding black men.
- 1979 – The Ghost Train fire at Luna Park Sydney, Australia, kills seven.
- 1995 – Ansett New Zealand Flight 703 crashes into the Tararua Range during approach to Palmerston North Airport on the North Island of New Zealand, killing four.
- 1999 – Kosovo War: The Federal Republic of Yugoslavia and NATO sign a peace treaty.
- 2008 – Two bombs explode at a train station near Algiers, Algeria, killing at least 13 people.
- 2009 – An explosion kills 17 people and injures at least 46 at a hotel in Peshawar, Pakistan.
- 2010 – At least 40 people are killed and more than 70 wounded in a suicide bombing at a wedding party in Arghandab, Kandahar.

== Births ==
=== Pre-1600 ===
- 1016 – Deokjong of Goryeo, ruler of Korea (died 1034)
- 1424 – Blanche II of Navarre (died 1464)
- 1580 – Daniel Heinsius, Belgian poet and scholar (died 1655)
- 1588 – Johann Andreas Herbst, German composer and theorist (died 1666)
- 1595 – Władysław IV Vasa, Polish king (died 1648)
- 1597 – Pieter Jansz. Saenredam, Dutch painter (died 1665)

=== 1601–1900 ===
- 1625 – Sarah Rapelje, the "first white child" of New Netherland (died 1685)
- 1640 – Leopold I, Holy Roman Emperor (died 1705)
- 1661 – Feodor III of Russia (died 1682)
- 1672 – Peter the Great, Russian emperor (died 1725)
- 1686 – Andrey Osterman, German-Russian politician, Russian Minister of Foreign Affairs (died 1747)
- 1696 – Shiva Rajaram, infant Chattrapati of the Maratha Empire (died 1726)
- 1732 – Giuseppe Demachi, Italian violinist and composer (died 1791)
- 1754 – Francis Mackenzie, 1st Baron Seaforth, English general and politician, Governor of Barbados (died 1815)
- 1768 – Samuel Slater, English-American engineer and businessman (died 1835)
- 1781 – George Stephenson, English engineer, designed the Liverpool and Manchester Railway (died 1848)
- 1810 – Otto Nicolai, German composer and conductor (died 1849)
- 1812 – Johann Gottfried Galle, German astronomer and academic (died 1910)
- 1836 – Elizabeth Garrett Anderson, English physician and politician (died 1917)
- 1837 – Anne Isabella Thackeray Ritchie, English author (died 1919)
- 1837 – Michele Rua, Italian Catholic priest and saint (died 1910)
- 1842 – Hazard Stevens, American military officer, mountaineer, politician and writer (died 1918)
- 1843 – Bertha von Suttner, Austrian journalist and author, Nobel Prize laureate (died 1914)
- 1845 – Frank Norton, American baseball player (died 1920)
- 1849 – Michael Ancher, Danish painter and academic (died 1927)
- 1851 – Charles Joseph Bonaparte, American lawyer and politician, 46th United States Attorney General (died 1921)
- 1861 – Pierre Duhem, French physicist, mathematician, and historian (died 1916)
- 1861 – Gustav Tammann, Russian-German chemist and physicist (died 1938)
- 1864 – Jeanne Bérangère, French actress (died 1928)
- 1865 – Albéric Magnard, French composer and educator (died 1914)
- 1865 – Carl Nielsen, Danish violinist, composer, and conductor (died 1931)
- 1868 – Jane Avril, French model and dancer (died 1943)
- 1874 – Launceston Elliot, Scottish weightlifter and wrestler (died 1930)
- 1875 – Henry Hallett Dale, English pharmacologist and physiologist, Nobel Prize laureate (died 1968)
- 1879 – Harry DeBaecke, American rower (died 1961)
- 1882 – Robert Kerr, Irish-Canadian sprinter and coach (died 1963)
- 1885 – Felicjan Sławoj Składkowski, Polish general and politician, 27th Prime Minister of Poland (died 1962)
- 1890 – Leslie Banks, English actor, director, and producer (died 1952)
- 1891 – Cole Porter, American composer and songwriter (died 1964)
- 1893 – Irish Meusel, American baseball player and coach (died 1963)
- 1895 – Archie Weston, American football player and journalist (died 1981)
- 1896 – Catherine Filene Shouse, American philanthropist (Wolf Trap Institute) (died 1994)
- 1898 – Luigi Fagioli, Italian race car driver (died 1952)
- 1900 – Fred Waring, American singer, bandleader, and television host (died 1984)

=== 1901–present ===
- 1902 – Skip James, American singer-songwriter and guitarist (died 1969)
- 1903 – Felice Bonetto, Italian race car driver (died 1953)
- 1903 – Marcia Davenport, American author and critic (died 1996)
- 1906 – Robert Klark Graham, American eugenicist and businessman, founded Repository for Germinal Choice (died 1997)
- 1908 – Luis Kutner, American lawyer, author, and activist (died 1993)
- 1908 – Branch McCracken, American basketball player and coach (died 1970)
- 1910 – Robert Cummings, American actor, singer, and director (died 1990)
- 1910 – Ted Hicks, Australian public servant and diplomat, Australian High Commissioner to New Zealand (died 1984)
- 1912 – Ingolf Dahl, German-American pianist, composer, and conductor (died 1970)
- 1913 – Patrick Steptoe, English scientist (developed in vitro fertilization) (died 1988)
- 1915 – Jim McDonald, American football player and coach (died 1997)
- 1915 – Les Paul, American guitarist and songwriter (died 2009)
- 1916 – Jurij Brězan, German soldier and author (died 2006)
- 1916 – Siegfried Graetschus, German SS officer (died 1943)
- 1916 – Robert McNamara, American businessman and politician, 8th United States Secretary of Defense (died 2009)
- 1917 – Eric Hobsbawm, Egyptian-English historian and author (died 2012)
- 1918 – John Hospers, American philosopher and politician (died 2011)
- 1921 – Arthur Hertzberg, American rabbi and scholar (died 2006)
- 1921 – Jean Lacouture, French journalist, historian, and author (died 2015)
- 1922 – George Axelrod, American director, producer, and screenwriter (died 2003)
- 1922 – Hein Eersel, Surinamese linguist and Minister of Education (died 2022)
- 1922 – John Gillespie Magee Jr., Anglo-American pilot and poet (died 1941)
- 1922 – Fernand Seguin, Canadian biochemist and academic (died 1988)
- 1923 – Gerald Götting, German politician (died 2015)
- 1924 – Ed Farhat, American wrestler and manager (died 2003)
- 1925 – Keith Laumer, American soldier and author (died 1993)
- 1925 – Herman Sarkowsky, German-American businessman and philanthropist, co-founded the Seattle Seahawks (died 2014)
- 1926 – Calvin "Fuzz" Jones, American singer and bass player (died 2010)
- 1926 – Happy Rockefeller, American philanthropist, 31st Second Lady of the United States (died 2015)
- 1927 – George Nigh, American politician, 17th and 22nd Governor of Oklahoma (died 2025)
- 1927 – Jim Nolan, American basketball player (died 1983)
- 1928 – R. Geraint Gruffydd, Welsh critic and academic (died 2015)
- 1929 – Johnny Ace, American singer and pianist (died 1954)
- 1930 – Barbara, French singer (died 1997)
- 1930 – Jordi Pujol, Spanish physician and politician, 126th President of the Generalitat de Catalunya
- 1931 – Jackie Mason, American stand-up comedian (died 2021)
- 1931 – Nandini Satpathy, Indian author and politician, 8th Chief Minister of Odisha (died 2006)
- 1931 – Bill Virdon, American baseball player, coach, and manager (died 2021)
- 1931 – Al Cantello, American javelin thrower and coach (died 2024)
- 1934 – Michael Mates, English colonel and politician
- 1934 – Jackie Wilson, American singer-songwriter (died 1984)
- 1935 – Dutch Savage, American wrestler and promoter (died 2013)
- 1936 – Nell Dunn, English playwright, screenwriter and author
- 1936 – Mick O'Dwyer, Irish Gaelic footballer and manager (died 2025)
- 1936 – George Radda, Hungarian chemist and academic
- 1937 – Harald Rosenthal, German hydrobiologist and academic
- 1938 – Jeremy Hardie, English economist and businessman
- 1938 – Giles Havergal, Scottish actor, director, and playwright
- 1938 – Charles Wuorinen, American composer and educator (died 2020)
- 1939 – Ileana Cotrubaș, Romanian soprano
- 1939 – Eric Fernie, Scottish historian and academic
- 1939 – David Hobbs, English race car driver and sportscaster
- 1939 – Dick Vitale, American basketball player, coach, and sportscaster
- 1939 – Charles Webb, American author (died 2020)
- 1940 – André Vallerand, Canadian businessman and politician
- 1941 – Richard A. Cash, American global health researcher (died 2024)
- 1941 – Jon Lord, English singer-songwriter and keyboard player (died 2012)
- 1942 – Anton Burghardt, German footballer and manager (died 2022)
- 1942 – Nicholas Lloyd, English journalist
- 1943 – John Fitzpatrick, English race car driver
- 1943 – Joe Haldeman, American sci-fi author
- 1943 – Charles Saatchi, Iraqi-English businessman, co-founded Saatchi & Saatchi
- 1944 – Janric Craig, 3rd Viscount Craigavon, English accountant and politician
- 1944 – Wally Gabler, American football player and sportscaster
- 1945 – Faina Melnik, Soviet discus thrower (died 2016)
- 1946 – Deyda Hydara, Gambian journalist and publisher, co-founded The Point (died 2004)
- 1946 – James Kelman, Scottish author and playwright
- 1946 – Peter Kilfoyle, English politician
- 1946 – Giulio Terzi di Sant'Agata, Italian politician and diplomat, Italian Minister of Foreign Affairs
- 1946 – Robbie Vincent, English radio broadcaster and DJ
- 1947 – Robert Indermaur, Swiss painter
- 1948 – Jim Bailey, American football player
- 1948 – Gudrun Schyman, Swedish social worker and politician
- 1948 – Tim Sullivan, American novelist (died 2024)
- 1949 – Kiran Bedi, Indian police officer and activist
- 1950 – Trevor Bolder, English bass player, songwriter, and producer (died 2013)
- 1950 – Fred Jackson, American football player and coach
- 1950 – Giorgos Kastrinakis, Greek-American basketball player
- 1951 – Michael Patrick Cronan, American graphic designer and academic (died 2013)
- 1951 – James Newton Howard, American composer, conductor, and producer
- 1951 – Dave Parker, American baseball player and coach (died 2025)
- 1951 – Brian Taylor, American basketball player
- 1952 – Uzi Hitman, Israeli singer-songwriter (died 2004)
- 1952 – Billy Knight, American basketball player
- 1953 – Ken Navarro, Italian-American guitarist and composer
- 1954 – Pete Byrne, English singer-songwriter (died 2026)
- 1954 – Paul Chapman, Welsh guitarist and songwriter (died 2020)
- 1954 – Gregory Maguire, American author
- 1954 – Elizabeth May, American-Canadian environmentalist, lawyer, and politician
- 1954 – George Pérez, American author and illustrator (died 2022)
- 1956 – Berit Aunli, Norwegian skier
- 1956 – Patricia Cornwell, American journalist and author
- 1956 – Marek Gazdzicki, Polish nuclear physicist
- 1956 – Joaquín, Spanish footballer
- 1956 – John Le Lievre, British squash player (died 2021)
- 1956 – Kayhan Mortezavi, Iranian director
- 1956 – Francine Raymond, French Canadian singer-songwriter
- 1956 – Nikolai Tsonev, Bulgarian politician
- 1956 – Rudolf Wojtowicz, Polish footballer
- 1957 – Randy Read, English crystallographer and academic
- 1958 – David Ancrum, American basketball player and coach
- 1959 – Peter Fowler, Australian golfer
- 1960 – Steve Paikin, Canadian journalist and author
- 1961 – Thomas Benson, American football player
- 1961 – Michael J. Fox, Canadian-American actor, producer, and author
- 1961 – Aaron Sorkin, American screenwriter, producer, and playwright
- 1962 – Yuval Banai, Israeli singer-songwriter and guitarist
- 1962 – Ken Rose, American football player
- 1962 – David Trewhella, Australian rugby league player
- 1963 – Gilad Atzmon, Israeli-English saxophonist, author, and activist
- 1963 – Johnny Depp, American actor
- 1963 – David Koepp, American director, producer, and screenwriter
- 1964 – Gloria Reuben, Canadian-American actress
- 1964 – Wayman Tisdale, American basketball player and bass player (died 2009)
- 1966 – Tamela Mann, American singer and actress
- 1967 – Rubén Maza, Venezuelan runner
- 1967 – Jian Ghomeshi, Iranian-Canadian radio personality
- 1968 – Niki Bakoyianni, Greek high jumper and coach
- 1969 – André Racicot, Canadian ice hockey player
- 1969 – Eric Wynalda, American soccer player, coach, and sportscaster
- 1971 – Gilles De Bilde, Belgian footballer and sportscaster
- 1971 – Jean Galfione, French pole vaulter and sportscaster
- 1971 – Jackie McKeown, Scottish singer-songwriter and guitarist
- 1972 – Matt Horsley, Australian footballer and coach
- 1973 – Aigars Apinis, Latvian discus thrower and shot putter
- 1973 – Tedy Bruschi, American football player and sportscaster
- 1973 – Frédéric Choffat, Swiss director, producer, and cinematographer
- 1973 – Grant Marshall, Canadian ice hockey player
- 1974 – Samoth, Norwegian singer-songwriter and guitarist
- 1974 – Randy Winn, American baseball player
- 1975 – Otto Addo, German-Ghanaian footballer and manager
- 1975 – Ameesha Patel, Indian actress and model
- 1975 – Andrew Symonds, English-Australian cricketer (died 2022)
- 1977 – Usman Afzaal, Pakistani-English cricketer
- 1977 – Paul Hutchison, English cricketer
- 1977 – Olin Kreutz, American football player
- 1977 – Peja Stojaković, Serbian basketball player
- 1978 – Matt Bellamy, English singer, musician and songwriter
- 1978 – Shandi Finnessey, American model and actress, Miss USA 2004
- 1978 – Miroslav Klose, German footballer
- 1978 – Heather Mitts, American soccer player
- 1978 – Hayden Schlossberg, American director, producer, and screenwriter
- 1979 – Dario Dainelli, Italian footballer
- 1979 – Amanda Lassiter, American basketball player
- 1980 – D'banj, Nigerian singer-songwriter and harmonica player
- 1980 – Mike Fontenot, American baseball player
- 1980 – Udonis Haslem, American basketball player
- 1980 – Lehlohonolo Seema, South African footballer
- 1980 – Marcin Wasilewski, Polish footballer and pundit
- 1981 – Natalie Portman, Israeli-American actress
- 1981 – Parinya Charoenphol, Thai boxer, model, and actress
- 1982 – Yoshito Ōkubo, Japanese footballer
- 1982 – Christina Stürmer, Austrian singer-songwriter
- 1983 – Firas Al-Khatib, Syrian footballer
- 1983 – Josh Cribbs, American football player
- 1983 – Dwayne Jones, American basketball player
- 1983 – Danny Richar, Dominican-American baseball player
- 1984 – Yuli Gurriel, Cuban baseball player
- 1984 – Jake Newton, Guyanese footballer
- 1984 – Asko Paade, Estonian basketball player
- 1984 – Masoud Shojaei, Iranian footballer
- 1984 – Wesley Sneijder, Dutch footballer
- 1985 – Richard Kahui, New Zealand rugby player
- 1985 – Sonam Kapoor, Indian model and actress
- 1985 – Sebastian Telfair, American basketball player
- 1986 – Doug Legursky, American football player
- 1986 – Yadier Pedroso, Cuban baseball player (died 2013)
- 1986 – Ashley Postell, American gymnast
- 1987 – Jaan Mölder, Estonian race car driver
- 1988 – Jason Demers, Canadian ice hockey player
- 1988 – Sara Isaković, Slovenian swimmer
- 1988 – Sokratis Papastathopoulos, Greek footballer
- 1988 – Mae Whitman, American actress
- 1989 – Dídac Vilà, Spanish footballer
- 1989 – Logan Browning, American actress
- 1990 – Matthias Mayer, Austrian skier
- 1990 – Antonella Alonso, Venezuelan pornographic actress
- 1991 – Aaron M. Johnson, American jazz saxophonist
- 1992 – Zach Hyman, Canadian ice hockey player
- 1992 – Yannick Agnel, French swimmer
- 1992 – Boyd Cordner, Australian rugby league player
- 1992 – Gino Peruzzi, Argentine footballer
- 1992 – Lucien Laviscount, English actor
- 1993 – George Jennings, Australian rugby league player
- 2000 – Diego Lainez, Mexican footballer
- 2000 – Laurie Hernandez, American gymnast
- 2001 – Xolo Maridueña, American actor.

== Deaths ==
=== Pre-1600 ===
- 68 – Nero, Roman emperor (born 37)
- 373 – Ephrem the Syrian, hymnographer and theologian (born 306)
- 439 – Spearthrower Owl, Teotihuacan figure active in Mayan Tikal
- 597 – Columba, Irish missionary and saint (born 521)
- 630 – Shahrbaraz, king of the Persian Empire
- 908 – Yang Wo, Prince of Hongnong
- 1075 – Gebhard of Supplinburg, Saxon count
- 1087 – Otto I of Olomouc (born 1045)
- 1238 – Peter des Roches, bishop of Winchester
- 1252 – Otto I, Duke of Brunswick-Lüneburg
- 1348 – Ambrogio Lorenzetti, Sienese painter (born 1290)
- 1361 – Philippe de Vitry, French composer and poet (born 1291)
- 1563 – William Paget, 1st Baron Paget, English accountant and politician, Chancellor of the Duchy of Lancaster (born 1506)
- 1572 – Jeanne d'Albret, Navarrese queen and Huguenot leader (born 1528)
- 1583 – Thomas Radclyffe, 3rd Earl of Sussex, English politician, Lord Lieutenant of Ireland (born 1525)
- 1597 – José de Anchieta, Spanish Jesuit missionary (born 1534)

=== 1601–1900 ===
- 1647 – Leonard Calvert, Colonial governor of Maryland (born 1606)
- 1656 – Thomas Tomkins, Welsh-English composer (born 1572)
- 1681 – William Lilly, English astrologer (born 1602)
- 1684 – Peregrine Palmer, English politician (born 1605)
- 1716 – Banda Singh Bahadur, Indian commander (born 1670)
- 1717 – Jeanne Guyon, French mystic and author (born 1648)
- 1799 – Chevalier de Saint-Georges, Caribbean-French violinist, composer, and conductor (born 1745)
- 1834 – William Carey, English minister and missionary (born 1761)
- 1870 – Charles Dickens, English novelist and critic (born 1812)
- 1871 – Anna Atkins, English botanist and photographer (born 1799)
- 1875 – Gérard Paul Deshayes, French geologist and conchologist (born 1795)
- 1889 – Mike Burke, American baseball player (born 1854)
- 1892 – William Grant Stairs, Canadian-English captain and explorer (born 1863)

=== 1901–present ===
- 1901 – Adolf Bötticher, German historian and author (born 1842)
- 1913 – Sarah Roberts, English woman who was the subject of a vampire legend (born 1872).
- 1923 – Princess Helena of the United Kingdom (born 1846)
- 1927 – Victoria Woodhull, American activist for women's rights (born 1838)
- 1929 – Louis Bennison, American stage and silent film actor (born 1884)
- 1929 – Margaret Lawrence, American stage actress (born 1889)
- 1929 – Alice Gossage, American journalist (born 1861)
- 1942 – František Erben, Czech gymnast (born 1874)
- 1952 – Adolf Busch, German-Austrian violinist and composer (born 1891)
- 1953 – Ernest Graves Sr., American football player, coach, and general (born 1880)
- 1956 – Chandrashekhar Agashe, Indian industrialist and lawyer (born 1888)
- 1956 – Hans Bergsland, Norwegian fencer (born 1878)
- 1956 – Thomas Hicks, Australian tennis player (born 1869)
- 1956 – Ferdinand Jodl, German general (born 1896)
- 1958 – Robert Donat, English actor (born 1905)
- 1959 – Adolf Otto Reinhold Windaus, German chemist and academic, Nobel Prize laureate (born 1876)
- 1960 – Harry S. Hammond, American football player and businessman (born 1884)
- 1961 – Camille Guérin, French veterinarian, bacteriologist and immunologist (born 1872)
- 1963 – Jacques Villon, French painter (born 1875)
- 1964 – Max Aitken, 1st Baron Beaverbrook, British businessman and politician, Chancellor of the Duchy of Lancaster (born 1879)
- 1968 – Bernard Cronin, Australian author and journalist (born 1884)
- 1972 – Gilberto Parlotti, Italian motorcycle racer (born 1940)
- 1973 – Chuck Bennett, American football player and coach (born 1907)
- 1973 – John Creasey, English author and politician (born 1908)
- 1973 – Erich von Manstein, German general (born 1887)
- 1974 – Miguel Ángel Asturias, Guatemalan journalist, author, and poet, Nobel Prize laureate (born 1899)
- 1979 – Cyclone Taylor, Canadian ice hockey player and civil servant (born 1884)
- 1981 – Allen Ludden, American game show host (born 1917)
- 1984 – Helen Hardin, American painter (born 1943)
- 1989 – George Wells Beadle, American geneticist and academic, Nobel Prize laureate (born 1903)
- 1991 – Claudio Arrau, Chilean-American pianist and educator (born 1903)
- 1993 – Alexis Smith, Canadian-born American actress (born 1921)
- 1994 – Jan Tinbergen, Dutch economist and academic, Nobel Prize laureate (born 1903)
- 1997 – Stanley Knowles, American-Canadian academic and politician (born 1908)
- 1998 – Lois Mailou Jones, American painter and academic (born 1905)
- 2000 – John Abramovic, American basketball player (born 1919)
- 2000 – Jacob Lawrence, American painter and academic (born 1917)
- 2004 – Rosey Brown, American football player and coach (born 1932)
- 2004 – Brian Williamson, Jamaican activist, co-founded J-FLAG (born 1945)
- 2006 – Drafi Deutscher, German singer-songwriter (born 1946)
- 2007 – Frankie Abernathy, American purse designer, cast-member on The Real World: San Diego (born 1981)
- 2008 – Algis Budrys, Lithuanian-American author and critic (born 1931)
- 2008 – Suleiman Mousa, Jordanian historian and author (born 1919)
- 2009 – Dick May, American race car driver (born 1930)
- 2010 – Ken Brown, British Guitarist who was a member of The Quarrymen (born 1940)
- 2011 – M. F. Husain, Indian painter and director (born 1915)
- 2011 – Tomoko Kawakami, Japanese voice actress (born 1970)
- 2011 – Mike Mitchell, American basketball player (born 1956)
- 2012 – Régis Clère, French cyclist (born 1956)
- 2012 – John Maples, Baron Maples, English lawyer and politician, Shadow Secretary of State for Defence (born 1943)
- 2012 – Ivan Minatti, Slovene poet and translator (born 1924)
- 2012 – Hawk Taylor, American baseball player and coach (born 1939)
- 2012 – Abram Wilson, American-English trumpet player and educator (born 1973)
- 2013 – Iain Banks, Scottish author (born 1954)
- 2013 – Bruno Bartoletti, Italian conductor (born 1926)
- 2013 – John Burke, English rugby player (born 1948)
- 2013 – Walter Jens, German philologist, historian, and academic (born 1923)
- 2013 – Zdeněk Rotrekl, Czech poet and historian (born 1920)
- 2014 – Bernard Agré, Ivorian cardinal (born 1926)
- 2014 – Stuart Long, American boxer and Catholic priest (born 1963)
- 2014 – Rik Mayall, English comedian, actor, and screenwriter (born 1958)
- 2014 – Elsie Quarterman, American ecologist and academic (born 1910)
- 2014 – Alicemarie Huber Stotler, American lawyer and judge (born 1942)
- 2014 – Gustave Tassell, American fashion designer (born 1926)
- 2014 – Bob Welch, American baseball player and coach (born 1956)
- 2015 – Pumpkinhead, American rapper (born 1975)
- 2015 – Pedro Zerolo, Spanish lawyer and politician (born 1960)
- 2017 – Adam West, American actor and investor (born 1928)
- 2018 – Fadil Vokrri, Kosovo Albanian football administrator and player (born 1960)
- 2019 – Bushwick Bill, Jamaican-American rapper (born 1966)
- 2020 – Pau Donés, Spanish singer (born 1966)
- 2022 – Julee Cruise, American singer-songwriter, musician, and actress (born 1956)
- 2022 – Billy Kametz, American voice actor (born 1987)
- 2022 – Matt Zimmerman, Canadian actor (born 1934)
- 2022 – Amir Liaquat Hussain, Pakistani politician, columnist and television host. (born 1971)
- 2023 – Alain Touraine, French sociologist (born 1925)
- 2024 – James Lawson, American activist, professor, and minister (born 1928)
- 2025 – Sly Stone, American musician and record producer (Sly and the Family Stone)
- 2025 – Pik-Sen Lim, Malaysian-British actress and voice artist.
- 2026 – Cyril Karabus, South African paediatric oncologist (born 1935)
- 2026 – Alexander Yanchulev, Bulgarian politician and engineer (born 1938)

== Holidays and observances ==
- Anniversary of the Accession of King Abdullah II (Jordan)
- Autonomy Day (Åland)
- Christian feast day:
  - Aidan of Lindisfarne (Evangelical Lutheran Church in America)
  - Blessed Anna Maria Taigi
  - Baithéne mac Brénaind
  - Bede (Evangelical Lutheran Church in America)
  - Columba
  - Ephrem the Syrian (Roman Catholic Church and Church of England)
  - José de Anchieta
  - Primus and Felician
  - June 9 (Eastern Orthodox liturgics)
- Coral Triangle Day
- Don Young Day (Alaska, United States)
- La Rioja Day (La Rioja)
- Murcia Day (Murcia)
- National Heroes' Day (Uganda)
