= Ravaghi =

Ravaghi (Persian: رواقی) is a surname. Notable people with the surname include:

- Ali Ravaghi, professor
- Behzad Ravaghi, Iranian musician and composer
