= Behzad Ravaghi =

Iranian musician (b. 1977)

Behzad Ravaghi بهزاد رواقی
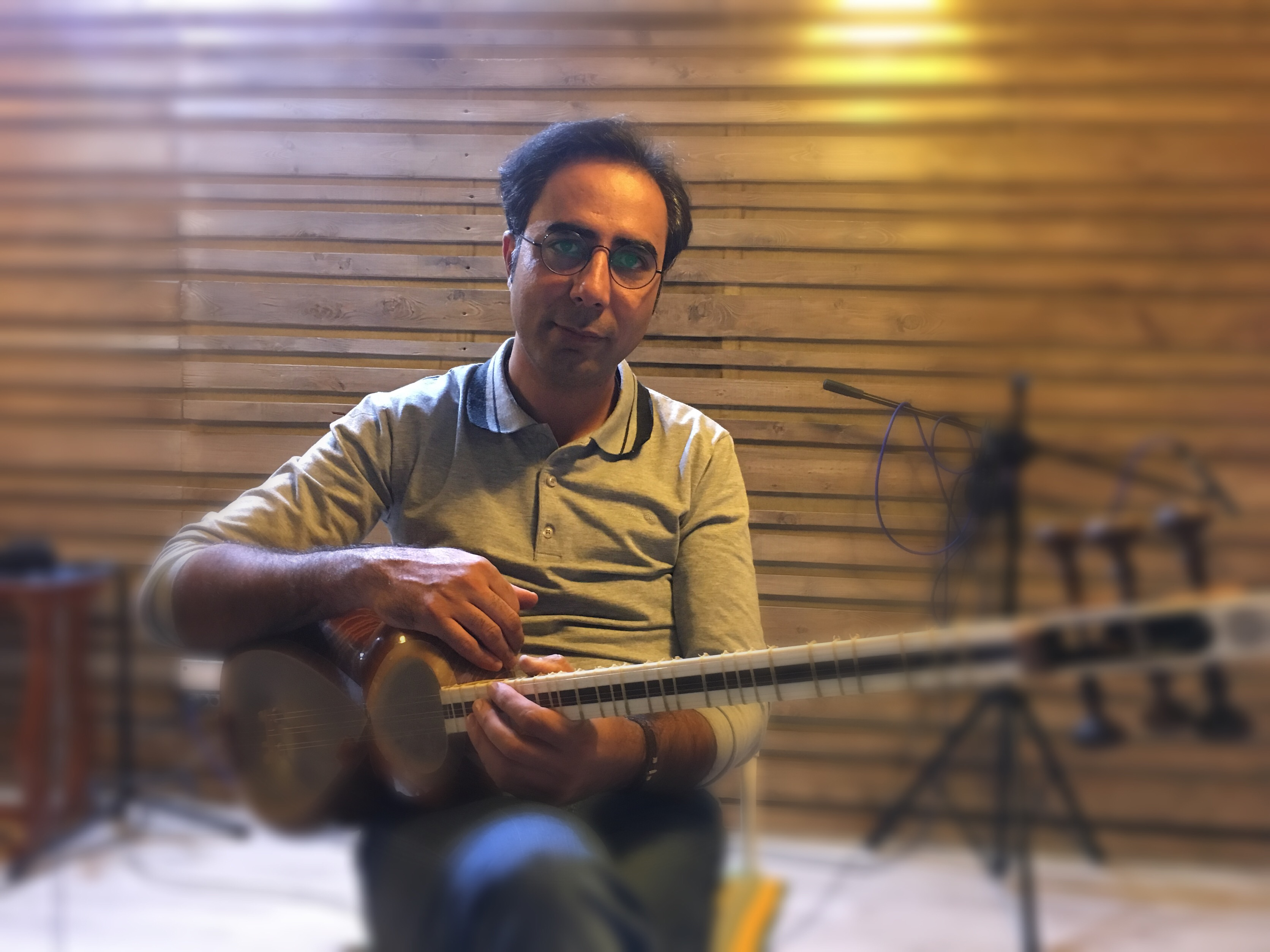

Background information
- Born: Behzad Ravaghi; 23 September 1977 (age 48)
- Origin: Tabriz, Imperial State of Iran
- Genres: contemporary; classical; Persian traditional
- Occupation: Musician
- Instruments: Tar, Setar, Bağlama
- Years active: 1987–present

Behzad Ravaghi (Persian: بهزاد رواقی; born 1 October 1977) is an Iranian musician and composer. In 2016, he won the Barbad Award for composing the music album "Darang". He began learning the tar in 1987 with Davud Azad and completed his training in Iranian music in 1989. He has appeared in many musical works as a tar, setar, and "Azerbaijani tar" player. The music album "Darang" composed and played by him was nominated as the best music album at the 32nd Fajr International Music Festival and won the Barbad Award.

== Awards ==
Winning the title of best musician in the music festival - 1980 Neyshabur

Winning first place in the soloists section of the National Music Festival - 1998 Tehran

Winning the "Barbad Award" in the non-verbal instrumental music section for the album "Darang" - 1996 Tehran

== Works ==
Composing and arranging the music album "Shakest Sokoot"

Tar player for the music album "Labriz" composed by Majid Derakhshani and song by Salar Aghili

Tar player for the music album "Dar Atash Avazha" composed by Navid Dehghan and song by Hamidreza Nourbakhsh

Tar player for the music album "Az Jan Vo Az Del" composed by Navid Dehghan and song by Salar Aghili

Tar player for the music album "Hame In Roza" composed by Karen Homayounfar

Tar player for the music album "Taraneh Man" song by Gholam Hossein Ashrafi

Tar player for the music album "Vatan" composed by Navid Dehghan and song by Salar Aghili

Tar player for the music album "Henares" composed and sung by Hossein Reza Asadi

Tar player for the music album "Mehrian" composed by Pedram Bloorchi and Babak Dashtinejad and Pedram Blourouchi

Tar player on the music album "Royaye Noghrei" composed by Mohammadreza Cheraghali and song by Behzad Abbasi

Tar player on the music album "Niaz" composed by Nima Varasteh and song by Samin Vatandoust

Tar player on the music album "Rasvaye Zamaneh" composed by Homayoun Khorram and song by Alireza Ghorbani

Tar player on the music album "Zir Asmoun Shahr" song by Amir Tajik

Tar player on the "Mah No" private performance with Mohammadreza Shajarian

Tar player on the music album "Shakhee Dar Dast Bad" composed by Peyman Khazani and sung by Kamran Mortazavi

Tar player on the music album "Sayad" composed by Mohammadreza Cheraghali and sung by Alireza Eftekhari

Tar player, setar and Baghlama, the music album "Your Air" composed by Mohammadreza Cheraghali and sung by Alireza Eftekhari
