= Coral Triangle =

Ecoregion of Asia–Pacific

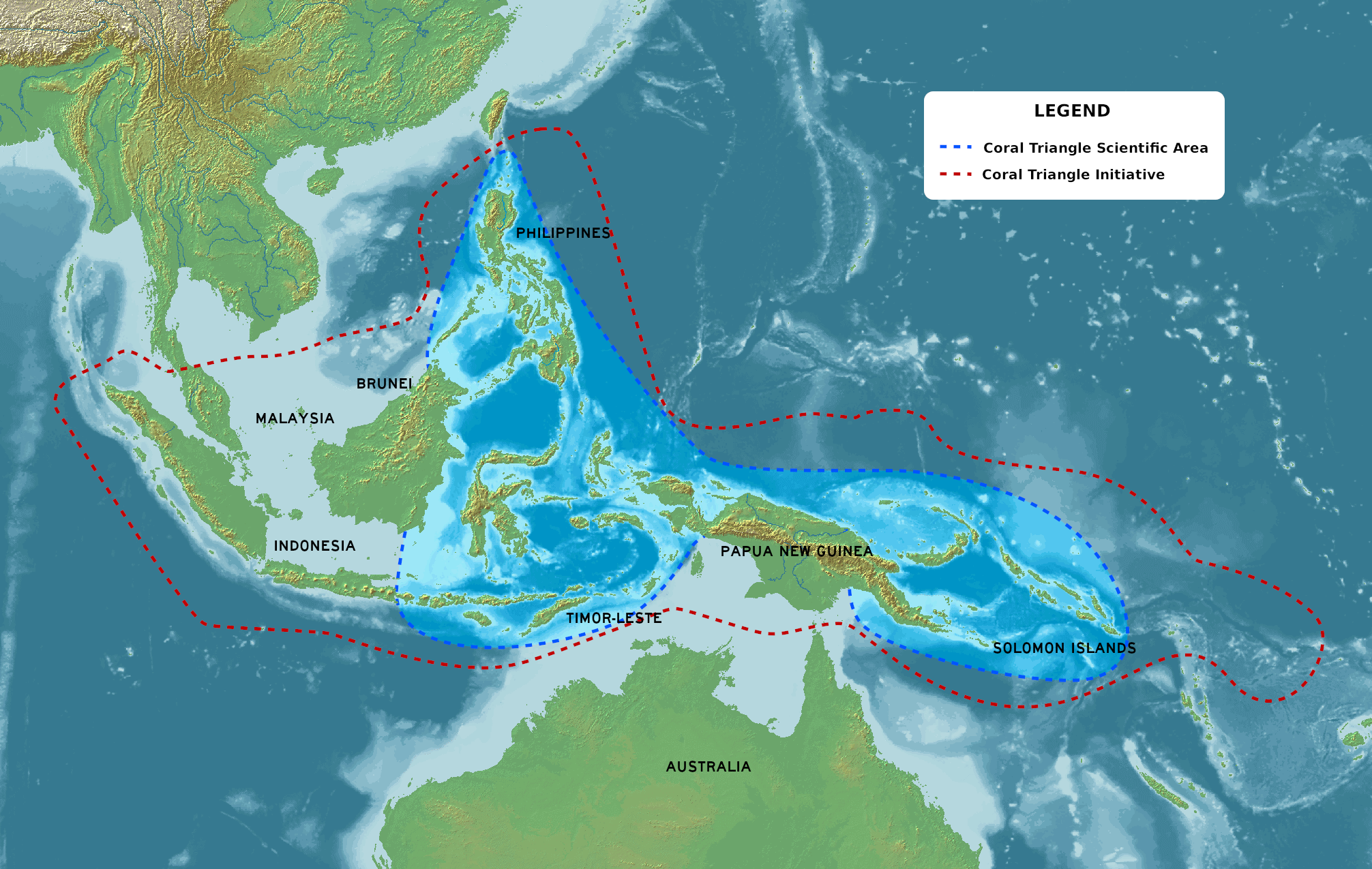
The Coral Triangle and countries participating in the Coral Triangle Initiative

The Coral Triangle (CT) is an area in the tropical waters around Indonesia, Malaysia, Papua New Guinea, the Philippines, Solomon Islands, and Timor-Leste. This area contains at least 500 species of reef-building corals in each ecoregion. The Coral Triangle is located between the Pacific and Indian oceans and encompasses portions of two biogeographic regions: the Indonesian-Philippines Region, and the Far Southwestern Pacific Region. As one of eight major coral reef zones in the world, the Coral Triangle is recognized as a global epicentrum of marine biodiversity and a global priority for conservation. Its biological resources make it a global hotspot of marine biodiversity. Known as the "Amazon of the seas" (by analogy to the Amazon rainforest in South America), it covers 5.7 million square kilometres (2,200,000 mi^{2}) of ocean waters. It contains more than 76% of the world's shallow-water reef-building coral species, 37% of its reef fish species, 50% of its razor clam species, six out of seven of the world's sea turtle species, and the world's largest mangrove forest. The epicenter of that coral diversity is found in the Bird's Head Seascape of Indonesian Papua, which hosts 574 species (95% of the Coral Triangle, and 72% of the world's total). In 2014, the Asian Development Bank (ADB) reported that the gross domestic product of the marine ecosystem in the Coral Triangle is roughly $1.2 trillion per year and provides food to over 120 million people. According to the Coral Triangle Knowledge Network, the region annually brings in about $3 billion in foreign exchange income from fisheries exports, and another $3 billion from coastal tourism revenues.

The World Wide Fund for Nature considers the region a top priority for marine conservation, and is addressing ecological threats to the region through its Coral Triangle Program, launched in 2007. One of the centers of biodiversity in the Triangle is the Verde Island Passage in the Philippines. The coral reefs in the region that have been declared UNESCO World Heritage Sites are the Tubbataha Reef Natural Park in the Philippines and the Raja Ampat UNESCO Global Geopark in Indonesia.

== Biodiversity ==
While it covers only 1.6% of the planet's oceanic area, the region has 76% of all known coral species in the world. As a habitat for 52% of Indo-Pacific reef fishes and 37% of the world's reef fishes, it contains the greatest diversity of coral reef fishes in the world More than 3,000 species of bony fish are distributed over more than 90% of the Coral Triangle. Among the largest of these fish are the whale shark, the coelacanth and the chimaeras.

The Coral Triangle is the epicentre for the biodiversity, not only of corals and fish, but also of many other marine organisms. It contains roughly 950 species of Molluscs and 458 crustacean species. It is also the habitat for six of the world's seven marine turtle species.

Thirteen percent of the Coral Triangle has been identified as being clustered into hotspots of high marine biodiversity importance, including the southern part of the Philippines, the north-eastern part of Sabah in Malaysia, the central to eastern zones of Indonesia, the eastern part of Papua New Guinea and the Solomon Islands. The parts of the Coral Triangle that have the highest number of species comprise 6% of the triangle's total area. They include stretches along the coast of the Philippines (including the northern coast of Luzon, Bohol, Mindanao, Palawan, and the Sulu Archipelago), Malaysia (the northeastern coast of Sabah), Indonesia (the northern and southeastern part of Sulawesi, the Banda Sea, Maluku Islands (the Mollucas), and the Raja Ampat Archipelago of Indonesian Papua), Papua New Guinea (the coastal areas of Madang Province, New Britain, Milne Bay, the Louisiade Archipelago, and Bougainville Island), and the Solomon Islands (Guadalcanal and Makira-Ulawa Province). However, more than half (70%) of the zones in the Coral Triangle are classified as low species richness areas.

The sites of highest marine biodiversity importance in the Coral Triangle include: (1) the northern tip of Sulawesi, (2) Ambon Island, (3) Kai Islands (also Kei Islands), (4) Raja Ampat Archipelago of Indonesian Papua, (5) the Verde Island Passage in the Philippines, (6) the southern part of Negros in the Philippines, and (7) Cebu in the Philippines.

The greatest extent of mangrove forest in the world is also found in the Coral Triangle. These forests' large area and extraordinary range of habitats and environmental conditions have played a major role in maintaining the staggering biodiversity of the Coral Triangle.

The Coral Triangle countries comprised a minimum of 10 to a maximum of 19 seagrass species that belong to four distinct families (Hydrocharitaceae, Cymodoceaceae, Zosteraceae, and Ruppiaceae) and cover almost 58,550.63 km^{2}. While a total of 21 species of seagrass have been found throughout this eco-region.

A joint Indonesian–U.S. marine survey expedition in 2008 discovered deep-sea biodiversity and underwater active volcanoes at a depth of 3800 meters along the western ridge. Around 40 newly identified deep-sea coral species were found there. Most are whitish in color, because the area is not a habitat for colorful algae species, which are generally shallow-living. Hydrothermal vents and coral reefs at a depth of 4000 meters were found to have created a habitat for marine niche shrimps, crabs, barnacles, and sea cucumbers.

According to Indonesia's Minister of Research and Technology / National Research and Innovation Agency (Menristek / Head of BRIN), Bambang Permadi Soemantri Brodjonegoro, Coral Triangle countries are in need of a greater number of taxonomists and oceanographers to address the challenges of cataloguing the biodiversity in the area. He has said that goal of this research is not only to increase human knowledge, but also to apply that knowledge to the project of protecting coastal and marine biodiversity from extinction.

=== Theories behind high species diversity of the Coral Triangle ===
There are three different theories as to why the Coral Triangle (East Indies Triangle) has such a high diversity of species, and each theory proposes a different explanatory model. They are usually termed the "centre of origin" model, the "centre of overlap" model, and the "centre of accumulation" model.

- The centre of origin model posits that the high diversity populations in the area of the archipelago are part of a centrally located ancestral population that later dispersed to various peripheral locations.
- The centre of overlap model posits that species originally in different biogeographic regions came together as a result of population division (vicariance) and later expanded their range.
- The centre of accumulation model posits that ancestral populations that were originally scattered among peripheral locations came together in a central location and formed a diverse population.
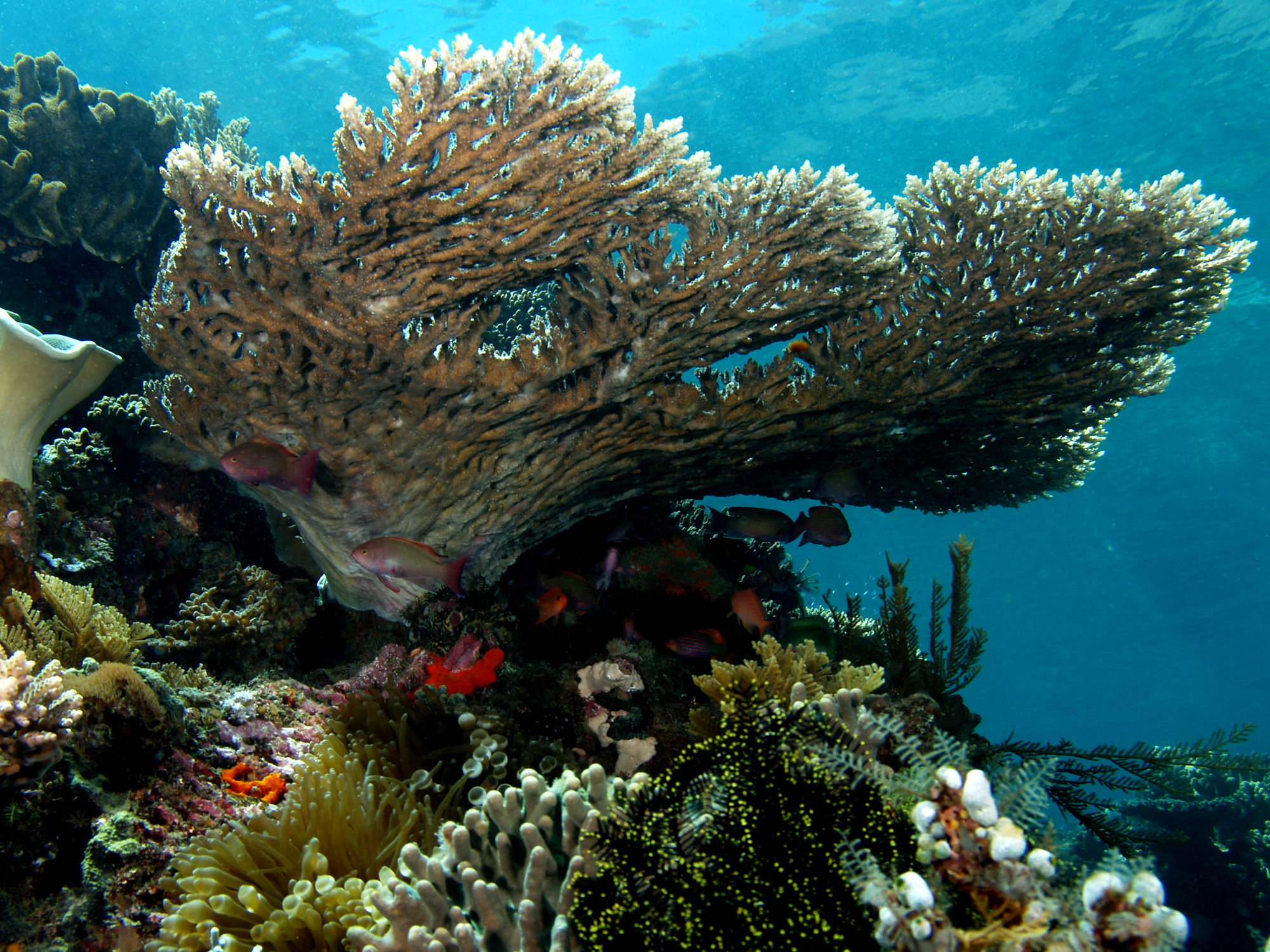
Table coral Acropora latistella

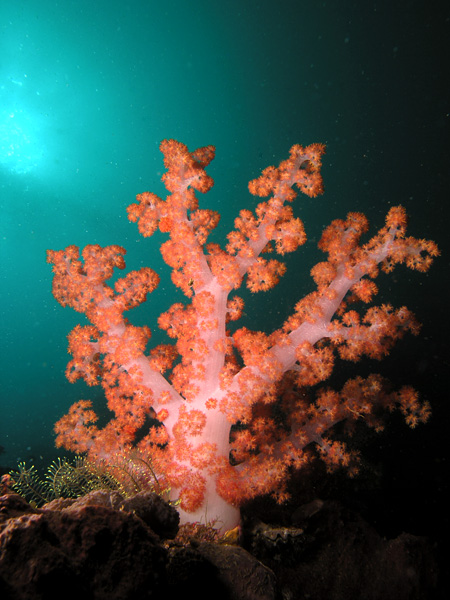
Pink soft coral

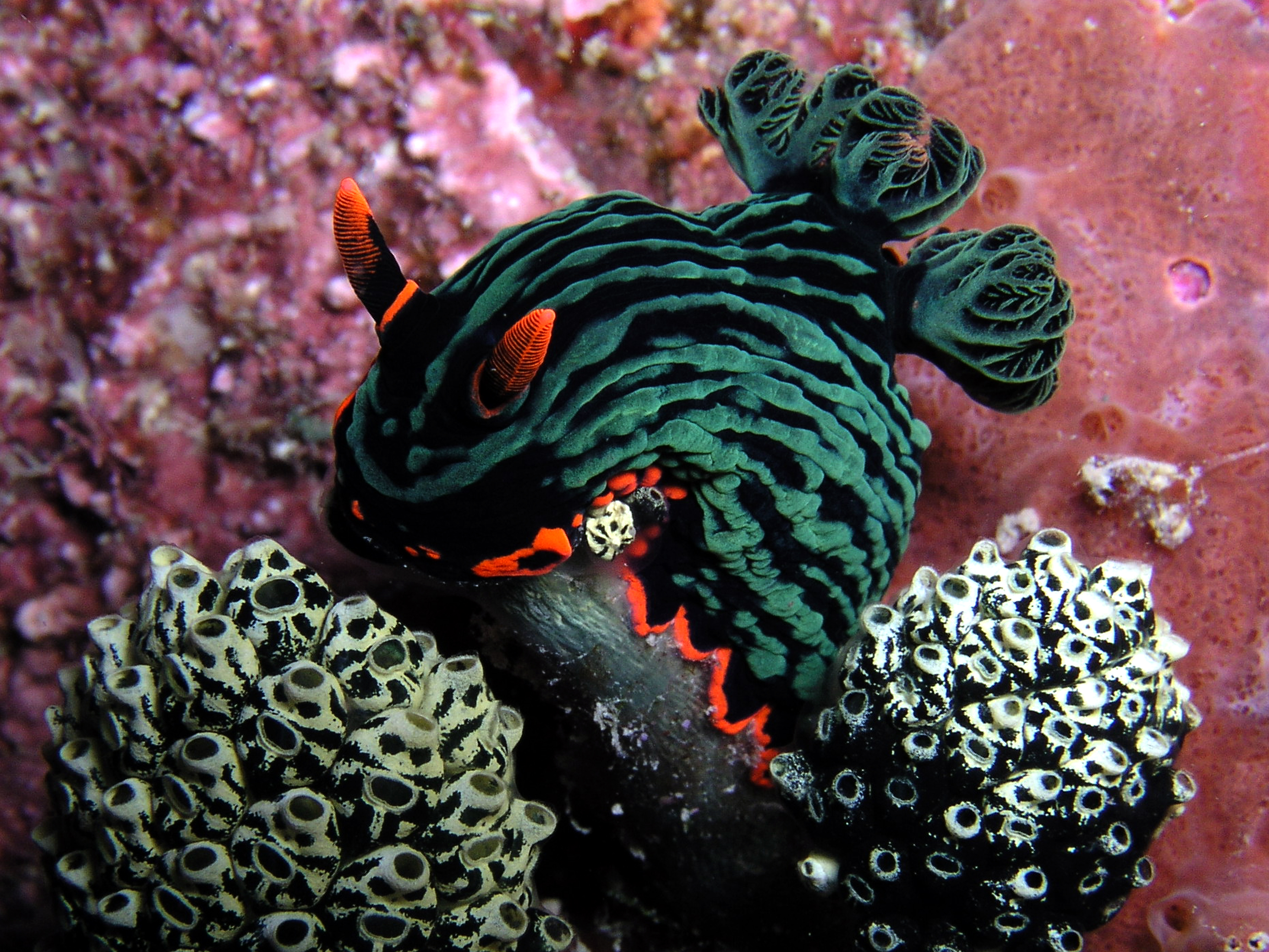
Nembrotha kubaryana

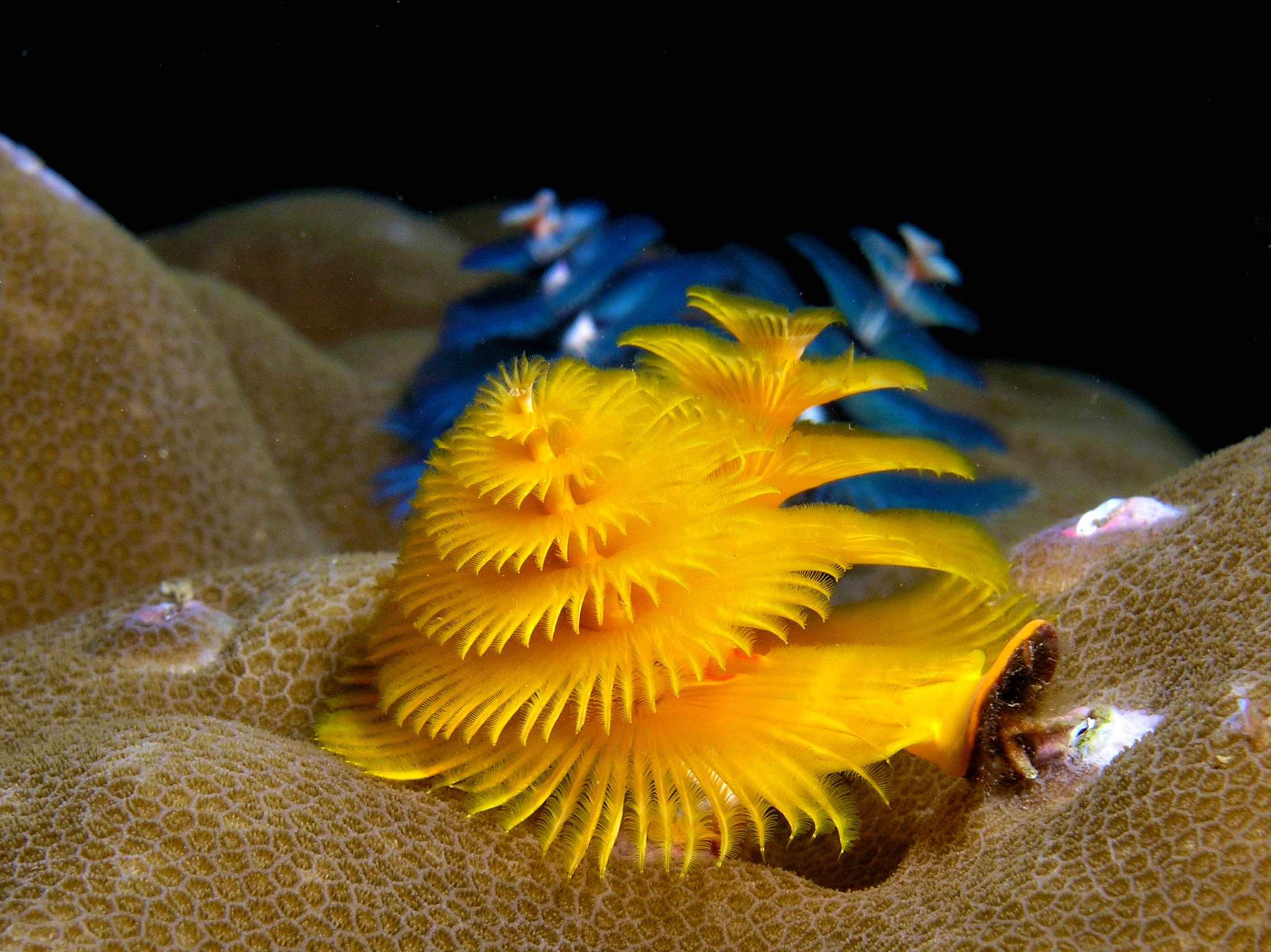
Christmas tree worms (Spirobranchus giganteus)

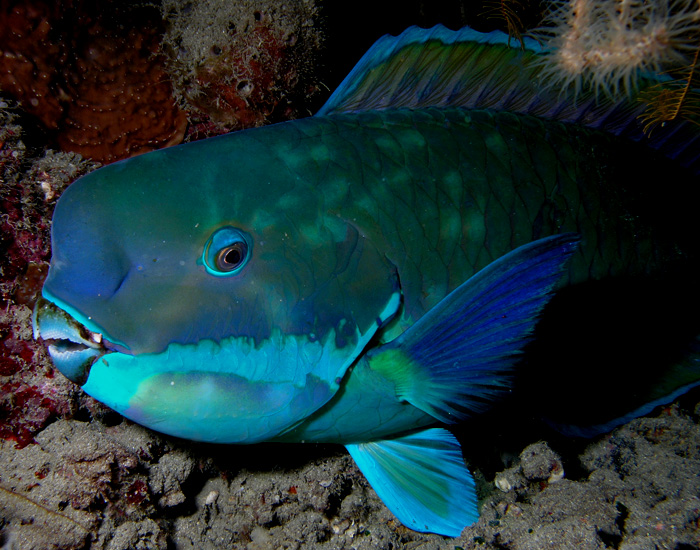
Parrotfish

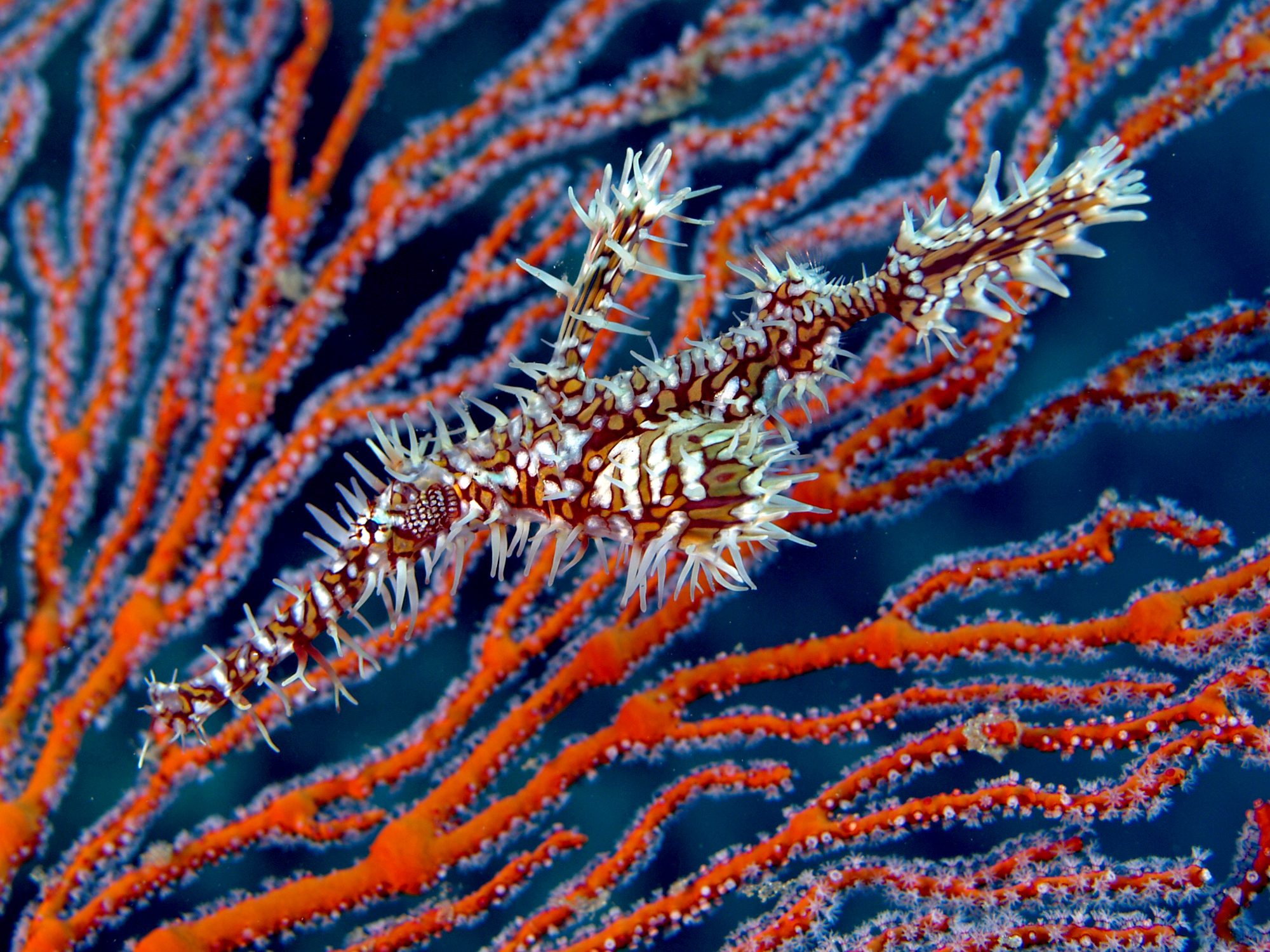
Harlequin ghost pipefish

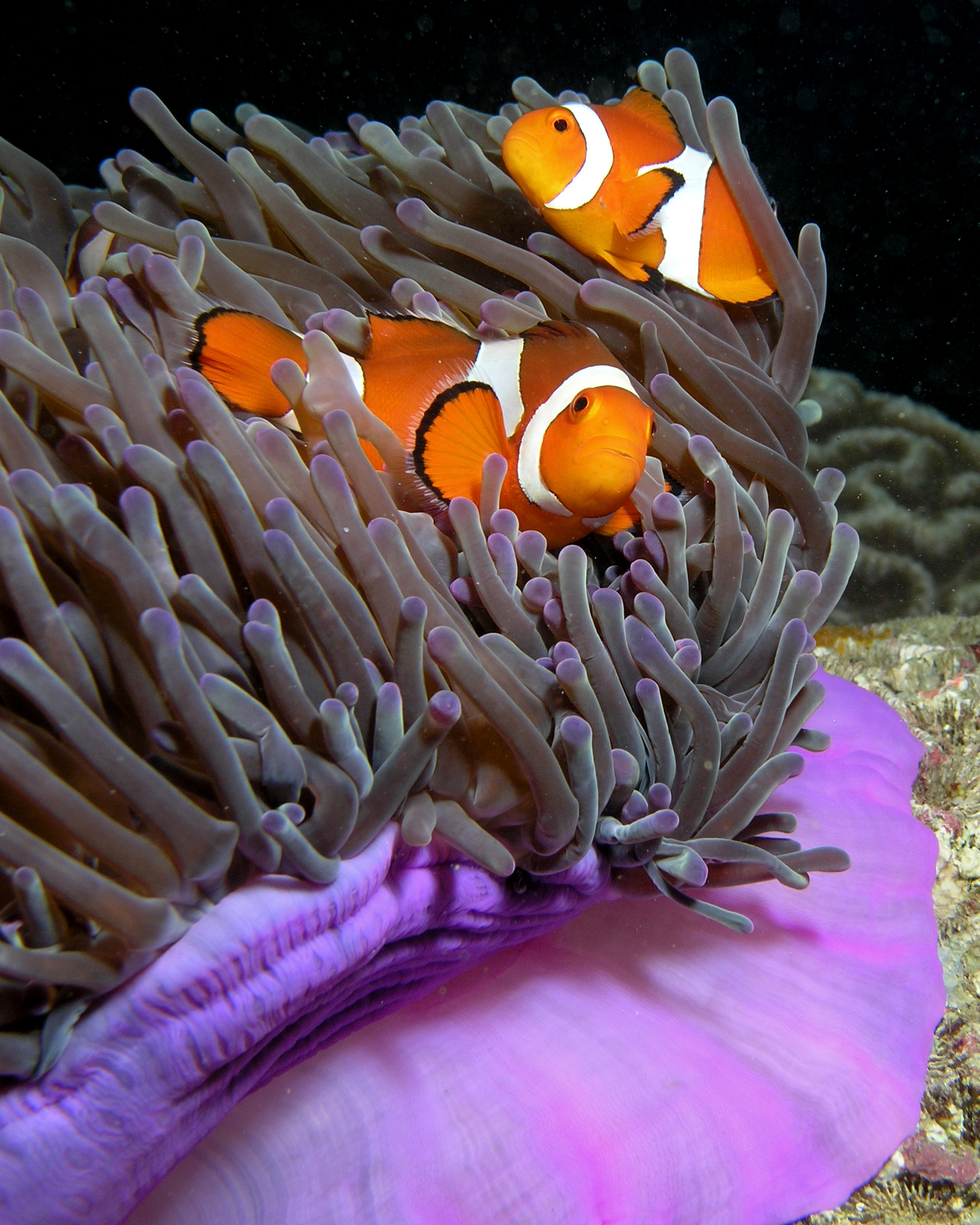
Anemonefish (Amphiprion ocellaris)

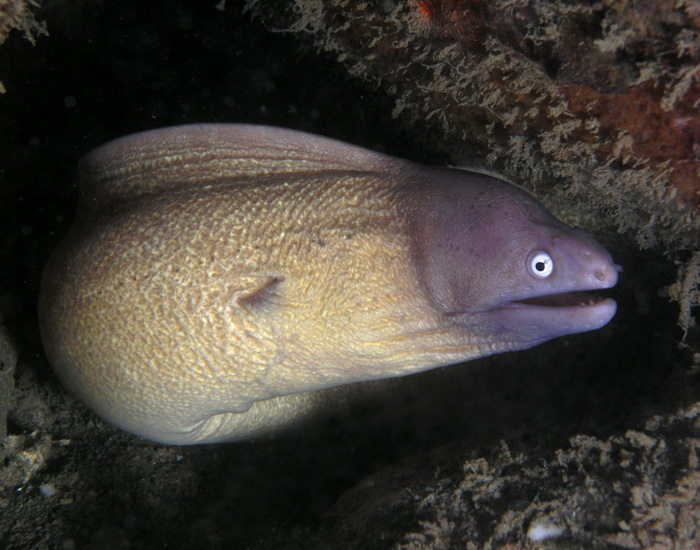
White-eyed moray eel (Gymnothorax thyrsoideus)

== Threats ==
The Coral Triangle lies at a crossroads of rapidly increasing anthropogenic activities, (population growth, economic growth and international trade), habitat change, over-exploitation of resources, and climate change. Competition, predation, fishing practices, marine pollution, marine debris, dredging, sunscreen contamination, climate change, ocean acidification (OA), disease, recreational diving, sea level rise, temperature increase and other issues briefly described in environmental issues with coral reefs.

Ocean acidification is a global threat to coral reef ecosystems. Based on the biodiversity in the Coral Triangle area, damage will come to many sectors, because the coral reef is a fundamental ecosystem in the coastal area. Started by rising levels of atmospheric carbon dioxide, the calcium carbonate decrease then enhances bioerosion and dissolution rate. The CT should have oligotrophic waters, so the light would penetrate and support photosynthesis by zooxanthellae algae. However coral reef in West Maui, Hawaii, has a sustained condition of nutrient-rich, lower pH submarine groundwater discharge that lowers the pH of seawater. Also, the corals are exposed to nitrate concentrations 50 times higher than ambient. Rates of coral calcification are substantially decreased, and rates of bioerosion are orders of magnitude higher than in healthy oligotrophic waters. Measurement using heavier nitrogen isotope (δ15N) values shows that eutrophication of reef seawater by land‐based sources of pollution can magnify the effects of ocean acidification through nutrient-driven-bioerosion. These conditions could contribute to the collapse of coastal coral reef ecosystems sooner than current projections based only on ocean acidification predict.

The biodiversity and natural productivity of the coral triangle are under threat from poor marine management (primarily from coastal development, overfishing and destructive fishing), lack of political will, poverty, high market demand, local disregard for rare and threatened species, climate change (warming, ocean acidification and rising sea levels). Coral reefs have experienced mass bleaching, which threaten to degrade the important ecosystems. An estimated 120 million people live within the Coral Triangle, of which approximately 2.25 million are fishers who depend on healthy seas to make a living. These threats are putting at risk livelihoods, economies, and future market supplies for species such as tuna. Studies have highlighted the alarming decline of coral cover in this region. However, a report published in 2021 described the reefs of the Coral Triangle as having shown resilience to large scale bleaching events. The Global Coral Reef Monitoring Network (GCRMN) reported in 2021, that the East Asian Seas region, which includes the Coral Triangle, was the only region where coral cover was substantially greater in 2019 (36.8%) as compared to 1983 (32.8%), which is the year that the earliest data was collected. This increase in coral cover occurred notwithstanding the reefs were affected by large scale coral bleaching events during the 2010s. The data on the cover of algae in the East Asian Seas shows that the cover of algae has progressively decreased resulting in an average of five times more coral than algae on these reefs.

Since the marine resources are a principal source of income for the population, the downstream effects of losing these critical coastal ecosystems are enormous.

== Conservation ==
The Coral Triangle is the subject of high-level conservation efforts by the region's governments, nature conservation organizations such as World Wide Fund for Nature, The Nature Conservancy and Konservasi Indonesia, and donor agencies such as the Asian Development Bank, the Global Environment Facility and USAID.

=== Coral Triangle Initiative on Coral Reefs, Fisheries, and Food Security ===
In August 2007, Indonesia's President Yudhoyono proposed a multilateral partnership to "safeguard the region's marine and coastal biological resources" with five other countries geographically located in the CT (Malaysia, Timor-Leste, Papua New Guinea, Solomon Islands, and the Philippines). The multilateral partnership then named as Coral Triangle Initiative on Coral Reefs, Fisheries and Food Security (CTI-CFF).

==== Goals of CTI-CFF ====
The plan of action of the CTI-CFF, is to achieve the following:

1. Priority seascapes designated and effectively managed
2. Ecosystem Approach to Management of Fisheries (EAFM) and other marine resources fully applied
3. Marine Protected Areas (MPAs) established and effectively managed
4. Climate change adaptation measures achieved
5. Threatened species status improving

The longer-term goals of the CTI-CFF are to:

- Stabilize and/or maintain coral reef ecosystem integrity and services

- Improve and sustain fish stocks

- Improve the affordability, availability, quality, and safety of food coming from coastal and marine environments

==== Meeting ====
The solid-science resources management strength builds with the scientific support of the university and research institute. On 28 February - 1 March 2017, the 1st Meeting of the CTI-CFF University Partnership in Manado was held, aimed at:

1. agreeing on CTI-CFF University Partnerships conceptual framework and mechanism, and the election of CTI-University Partnership Coordinator;
2. building-up tangible and collaborative programs and funding support (education, research, and outreach) among Universities and research institutes that can be developed for supporting regional capacity buildings, research needed, and outreach programs related to the CTI-CFF Regional Plan of Action (RPOA) goals as to achieved qualified CTI-CFF outcomes;
3. identifying possible support and mechanism to strengthening capacity and quality of Regional Secretariat, Technical Working Groups and the National Coordination Committee to undertake their functions.

The results of this meeting:

1. the conceptual framework and mechanism of CTI-CFF University Partnerships was established,
2. three tangible program/actions, specifically (a). capacity building priority program which establishes international M.Sc. subject on Coral Triangle Ecosystem Governance and special assistance program for Timor-Leste in developing fisheries and marine sciences education; (b). nine research priority programs and nine identified topics; (c). outreach priority actions
3. University Partnership Coordinator of CT-CFF is Prof. Dr. Grevo Gerung from Sam Ratulangi University, Indonesia for 2017-2020 and the second Meeting of the CTI-CFF University Partnership will be held in 2018.

== Delineation ==
The primary criteria used to delineate the Coral Triangle were:

- High species biodiversity (more than 500 coral species, high biodiversity of reef fishes, foraminifera, fungi corals, and stomatopods) and habitat diversity
- On the Oceanography side, The Indonesian Throughflow region (ITF) (input = −10.7 to −18.7 Sv; output= −2.6 Sv to −9.8 Sv) has a significant role in the Coral Triangle area with its functions such as regulating the global ocean circulation, the climate system, and the ecosystem sustainability, so the region retains maximum marine biodiversity. Including its complex geography and circulation features, the variability in transport of passages, sea surface temperature, and mesoscale variability in the region should be defined. The seasonal and interannual variability of mixing suggests the Coral Triangle area is influenced by ENSO and the Asian‐Australian monsoon system.
- Passages in the Coral Triangle area can be defined in ten locations. These are: (1) Makassar Strait, (2) Lifamatola Strait, (3) Lombok Strait, (4) Ombai Strait, (5) Timor Passage, (6) Luzon Strait, (7) Karimata Strait, (8) Mindoro Strait, (9) Sibutu Strait, and (10) Torres Strait. The current system of the Coral Triangle is influenced by the North Equatorial Current (NEC); North Equatorial Countercurrent (NECC); South Equatorial Current (SEC); South Equatorial Countercurrent (SECC); Mindinao Eddy (ME); Halmahera Eddy (HE); and New Guinea Coastal Current (NGCC).

There is considerable overlap between the boundaries of the Coral Triangle that are based primarily on high coral biodiversity (more than 500 species), and the boundaries based on the area of greatest biodiversity for coral reef fishes.

== Media ==
The 2013 documentary film Journey to the South Pacific tells the story of Coral Triangle conservation against the backdrop of island life.

== See also ==
- Coral Triangle Initiative on Coral Reefs, Fisheries, and Food Security
- Coral Triangle Day
- List of reefs
- Great Barrier Reef – The largest coral reef on Earth, the northern portion of which lies within the CT
