= Coral Triangle Initiative =

Marine/coastal resource initiative

- Logo
- Regional Secretariat: Manado, Indonesia
- Type: Multilateral partnership
- Members: 6 countries: Indonesia; Malaysia; Papua New Guinea; Philippines; Solomon Islands; Timor-Leste
- Website www.coraltriangleinitiative.org

The Coral Triangle Initiative on Coral Reefs, Fisheries, and Food Security (CTI-CFF), or the Coral Triangle Initiative (CTI), is a multilateral collaborative partnership among six countries (Indonesia, Malaysia, Papua New Guinea, the Philippines, Solomon Islands, Timor-Leste). Partners work together to sustain living marine and coastal resources by addressing crucial issues such as food security, climate change, and marine biodiversity.

== Background ==
The "Coral Triangle" (CT) region is located along Earth's equator at the confluence of the Western Pacific and Indian Oceans. Using coral and reef fish diversity as two primary criteria, scientists defined boundaries of this region to include most of the exclusive economic zones of these partner countries: Indonesia, Malaysia, Papua New Guinea, Philippines, Solomon Islands, and Timor-Leste (the ‘CT6’).

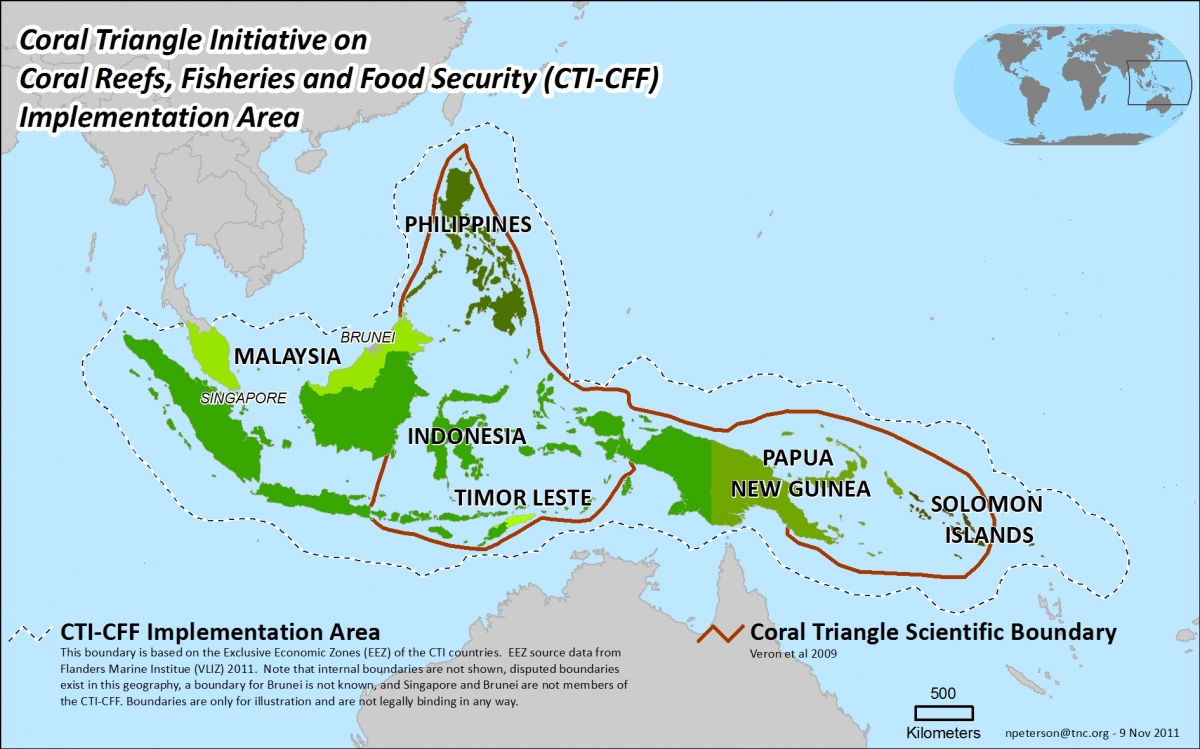
Countries participating in the Coral Triangle Initiative

Covering 1.62% of the planet's total Ocean area, there is broad scientific consensus that the CT represents the global epicenter of marine life abundance and diversity. This region has 76% of all known coral species, 37% of all known coral reef fish species, 53% of the world's coral reefs, and the largest extent of mangrove forests in the world.

It is a significant global refuge for marine life, including spawning and juvenile growth areas for the world's largest tuna fishery, six species of threatened marine turtles, endangered fish, and cetaceans such as tuna and blue whales.

Biogeography conditions within the CT may enable this region to maintain its high productivity despite future climate change impacts.

Marine and Coastal Living Resources

A high concentration of marine and coastal resources provide major benefits to the approximately 363 million people who reside in the Coral Triangle. As a source of food, income and viable protection from severe weather events, the health of these ecosystems is critical to these communities continued survival.

These resources are under significant and increasing threat due to climate change and human activity. Climate-related threats include coral bleaching and ocean acidification, which can damage the structure of corals and slow growth rates. Other major threats include over-fishing and destructive fishing (such as blast fishing and poison fishing); watershed-based pollution (including excessive soil and nutrient runoff); coastal habitat conversion resulting from coastal development (including loss of mangrove and seagrass habitats); marine-based pollution; and exploitation of threatened species (including for the aquarium fish trade).

The current and future status of the resources across this region remains of great concern, though data shows the reefs of the Coral Triangle have show resilience to large scale bleaching events. The Global Coral Reef Monitoring Network (GCRMN) reported in 2021 that the East Asian Seas region, which includes the Coral Triangle, was the only region where coral cover was substantially greater in 2019 (36.8%) as compared to 1983 (32.8%). Though the overall coral cover increased over this time period, many reefs in the region were affected by large scale coral bleaching events during the 2010s.

== Establishment ==
Viewing it necessary to safeguard the region's marine and coastal resources, Indonesian President Yudhoyono encouraged other leaders in the region to launch the Coral Triangle Initiative on Coral Reefs, Fisheries and Food Security (CTI-CFF) in 2009. The CTI-CFF is a multilateral partnership between the governments of Indonesia, Malaysia, Papua New Guinea, Philippines, Solomon Islands and Timor-Leste (the ‘CT6’).

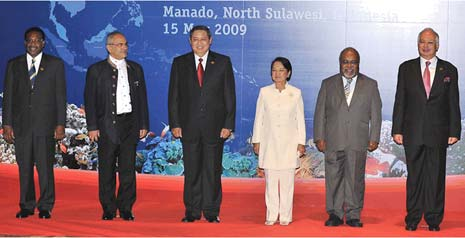
Six Heads of States/Governments signed the CTI Declaration in Indonesia on May 15, 2009

At the Leader's Summit in 2009, these governments agreed to adopt a 10-year CTI-CFF Regional Plan of Action (CTI RPOA) to safeguard the region's marine and coastal biological resources.

Through the CTI-CFF, the Coral Triangle countries have agreed to support people-centered biodiversity conservation, sustainable development, poverty reduction and equitable benefit sharing.

The CTI-CFF also seeks to address both poverty reduction through economic development, food security, sustainable livelihoods for coastal communities and biodiversity conservation through the protection of species, habitats and ecosystems.

== 5 Goals of Regional Plan of Action ==
The plan of action of the CTI-CFF, is to achieve the following:

1. Priority seascapes designated and effectively managed
2. Ecosystem Approach to Management of Fisheries (EAFM) and other marine resources fully applied
3. Marine Protected Areas (MPAs) established and effectively managed
4. Climate change adaptation measures achieved
5. Threatened species status improving

The longer-term goals of the CTI-CFF are to:

- Stabilize and/or maintain coral reef ecosystem integrity and service

- Improve and sustain fish stocks

- Improve the affordability, availability, quality, and safety of food coming from coastal and marine environments

== Regional Secretariat ==
The Coral Triangle Initiative on Coral Reefs, Fisheries and Food Security (CTI-CFF) Regional Secretariat was created during the First CTI-CFF Senior Officials Meeting in Bali during December 2007.

It mandates promoting regional cooperation, sharing lessons learned plus facilitating leadership learning across the six Coral Triangle countries - Indonesia, Malaysia, Papua New Guinea, Philippines, Solomon Islands and Timor-Leste.

The Regional Secretariat also coordinates and monitors progress toward achieving CTI-CFF Regional Plan of Action goals.

Main activities cover the following areas: organizational development, outreach and communication, regional coordination and mechanisms, technical and thematic working groups, development of key regional reports, and capacity development. It also serves as the main liaison and for all CTI-CFF official functions such as the bi-annual CTI-CFF Senior Officials Meetings and the annual CTI-CFF Ministerial Meetings. The CTI-CFF Regional Secretariat Headquarters are based in Manado, North Sulawesi, Indonesia.

Geographic scope for implementation of the Plan of Action

The CTI-CFF Plan of Action may be implemented within waters under national jurisdiction of each of the Coral Triangle governments, in accordance with their rights and obligations pursuant to international laws and the prevailing laws, rules and regulations of each country.

Applying scope of the CTI is without prejudice to the sovereign rights of the parties over marine resources within each national jurisdiction, or upon the legal position of each party on delimitating maritime boundaries between States with opposite or adjacent coasts. The geographic scope of CTI implementation is not intended in any way to redraw the scientific boundaries of the Coral Triangle which are defined by coral and coral reef fish diversity.

== Seascape General Model ==
In 2017, the CTI-CFF announced the Seascape General Model, which is statement of a management approach, to assist the CTI-CFF in building a consistent regional framework for sustainable management and a platform for future investment for Priority Seascapes at the regional and national level. Marine biogeographic areas or regions have different descriptions depending on the management approach applied:

- Large marine ecosystems (LMEs) are global units for resource management, which built on the Regional Seas Program of United Nations Environment Programme (UNEP) in the 1990s.
- Ecoregions mean large areas for a representation approach to conserving biodiversity terminology used by World Wildlife Fund (WWF).
- Seascapes means large multiple-use geographies of biological and ecological importance with emphasis on multi-sectoral and multi-level governance and coalition building approach, which terminology was used by Conservation International (CI).

In the CTI-CFF Seascape General Model, a ‘seascape’ is:

“a geographic area where multiple uses and sectors, as well as multiple management designations and governance mechanisms, can be integrated and coordinated. The area is often ecologically valued, politically relevant and logistically practical to manage, and can serve multiple purposes, such as fishing, tourism, recreation, and protection from some of the effects of climate change … Functionally, seascapes provide a platform to coordinate the various policies, laws, and regulations within the marine space such as navigation, fishing, mining, and traditional and cultural uses”.

The CTI-CFF Seascape General Model is also intended to facilitate “triple bottom line benefits (economic, social and environmental), that together exceed the benefits arising from marine resource management alone”.

In the CTI-CFF Seascape General Model, ‘Priority Seascapes’ are those seascapes, which can be trans-boundary and/or national, that have been evaluated based on the criteria for the designation of Priority Seascapes by the Committee of Senior Officials (CSO) and Council of Ministers (COM) of the CTI-CFF. There are 7 criteria for the designation of Priority Seascapes, the first of which involves the demonstration of high values in at least three of the following:

- Ecological significance (Examples: Ecologically or Biologically Significant Areas (EBSA), Key Biodiversity Areas (KBA), migratory routes, nesting sites for sea turtles, etc.)
- Biological productivity
- Economic (existing or potential)
- Cultural / heritage values
- Resilience

The remaining criteria assess factors relating to aspects of the socio-cultural values, political will, stakeholder support and engagement, economic opportunity (which may include collaboration and partnership, financial support, etc.) to move the process of creating a seascape forward; and also that a seascape has data and information available and accessible for decision making.

The case study provided in the CTI-CFF Seascape General Model (2017) is the Sulu-Sulawesi Marine Ecoregion (SSME) is a semi-enclosed large marine ecosystem that encompasses Indonesia, Malaysia and Philippines that was established following the ecoregion approach – the terminology used by the World Wildlife Fund (WWF) to mean large areas for a representation approach to conserving biodiversity. Following its recognition as a Priority Seascape under the Regional Plan of Action of the CTI-CFF, the SSME was renamed as the Sulu-Sulawesi Seascape. Although, the existing SSME initiatives, such as Marine Protected Area (MPA) networks for migratory marine turtles and ecosystem approach to fisheries, with climate change components, continue under the CTI-CFF Framework, as CTI-CFF Sulu-Sulawesi Seascape projects.

The CTI-CFF Seascape General Model (2017) provides “a general model for the sustainable management of seascapes” for other marine biogeographic areas or regions in the Coral Triangle.

As of 2022, CTI-CFF have endorsed a total three Priority Seascapes (Sulu Sulawesi Seascape, Bismarck Solomon Seas Ecoregion and Lesser Sunda).

== Regional Plan of Action (RPOA) 2.0 (2021-2030) ==
In 2009, a 10-year Regional Plan of Action (RPOA 1.0) was developed for the CTI-CFF. In 2022 the follow-on Regional Plan of Action was published as RPOA 2.0, which set 2 goals (as well as objectives, targets, activities and expected outcomes).

The 2 objectives were summarised as:

“The 1st goal is, by 2025, coastal communities and the coastal and marine ecosystems are enabled to cope with the impacts of climate change, natural and anthropogenic threats, in the Coral Triangle region. And the 2nd goal, by 2030, coastal communities and the coastal and marine ecosystems in the CT region are more resilient/able to adapt to impacts of climate change, natural and anthropogenic threats, by improving food security, sustainable fisheries and coastal livelihoods.”

== See also ==
- Coral Triangle
- Coral Triangle Day
- Environment of Indonesia
- Ecoregions in the Philippines
- Exclusive economic zone of Indonesia
- Indomalayan realm
- Marine traffic
- Pacific Disaster Center
- Spratly Islands
- South Pacific garbage patch
- Sustainable Development Goals
- United Nations Convention on the Law of the Sea
- Wallace Line
