= World Oceans Day =

Observance day on or around June 8

World Ocean Day
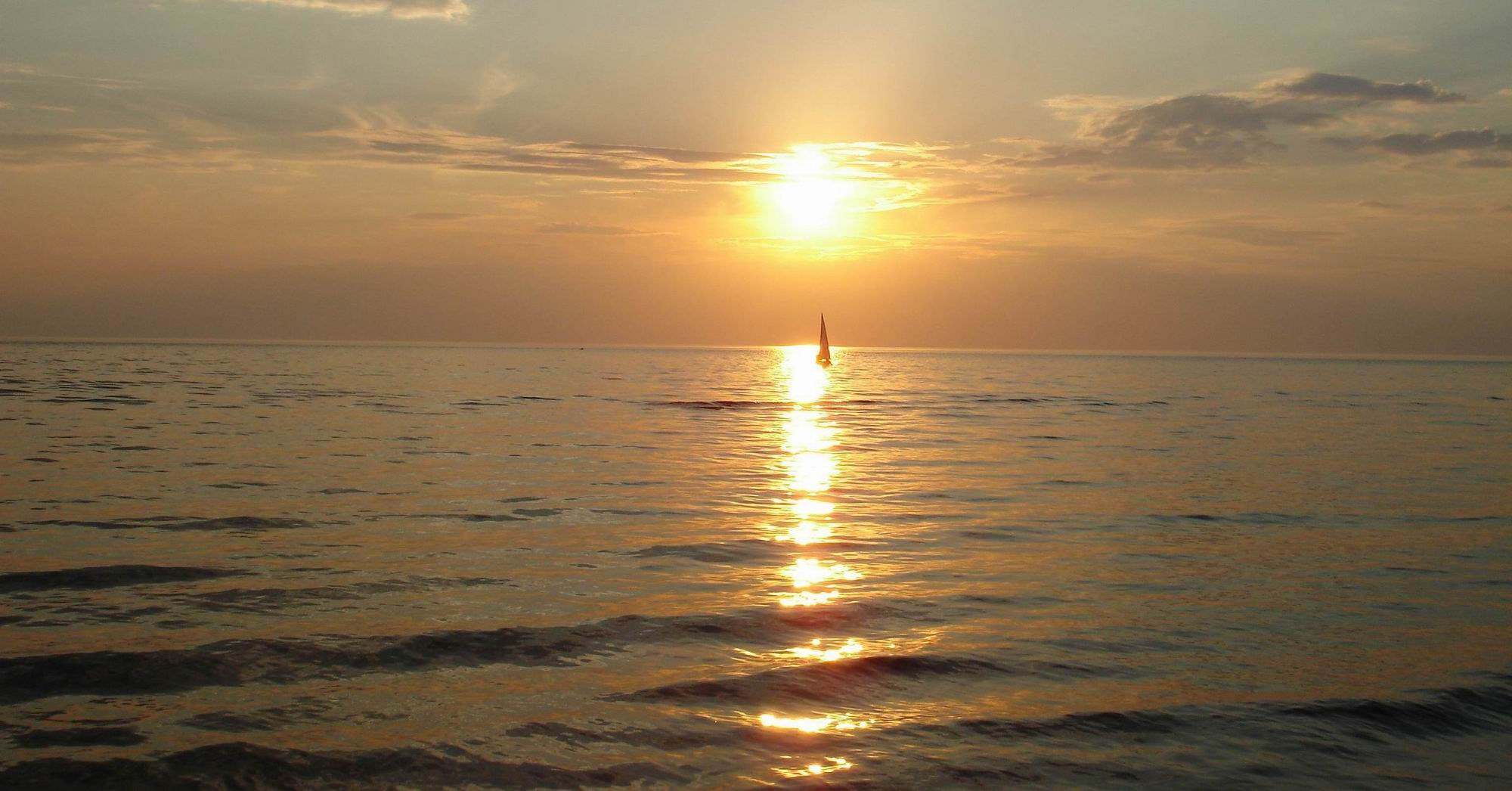
- A sunset over the White Sea
- Observed by: All UN member states, including Argentina Australia, Austria, Brazil, Canada, Chile, Denmark, Finland, France, Germany, India, Israel, Italy, Japan, Mexico, the Netherlands, Norway, the Philippines, Poland, South Africa, Spain, Switzerland, Thailand and the United States
- Date: 8 June
- Next time: 8 June 2027
- Frequency: Annual
- First time: 8 June 1992; 34 years ago

World Oceans Day (WOD) is an international day that takes place annually on June 8. The concept was originally proposed in 1992 by Canada's International Centre for Ocean Development (ICOD) and the Ocean Institute of Canada (OIC) at the Earth Summit (the UN Conference on Environment and Development) held that year in Rio de Janeiro, Brazil. The day was officially recognized by the United Nations in 2008, and is observed by all UN member states.

The observance supports the implementation of worldwide Sustainable Development Goal 14, and fosters public interest in the protection of oceans and the sustainable management of their resources.

== History ==
=== The Original Initiative of World Oceans Day ===
The Brundtland Commission (also known as the World Commission on Environment and Development) noted in the 1987 Brundtland Report that the ocean sector lacked a strong voice compared to other sectors.

At the first World Ocean Day in 1992, the objectives were to move the ocean from the sidelines to the center of intergovernmental and NGO discussions and policy and to strengthen the voice of ocean and coastal constituencies worldwide.

== See also ==
- Coral Triangle Day – CTI-CFF Collabratory Celebrations
- European Maritime Day
- Marine pollution – Pollution of oceans from substances discarded by humans
- Ocean governance – Policy, actions and affairs regarding the world's oceans
- Overfishing – Removal of any species of fish from water at a rate that the species cannot replenish
- Spaceship Earth – Worldview of Earth as an enclosed biosystem
