= Coral Triangle Day =

CTI-CFF Collabratory Celebrations

- Also called: CTDay
- Observed by: Coral Triangle Initiative on Coral Reefs, Fisheries and Food Security (CTI CFF) member countries
- Date: 9 June
- Next time: 9 June 2025
- Frequency: annual

The Coral Triangle Day was established on June 9, to celebrate and raise awareness of the ocean conservation and protection, especially on the Coral Triangle, the world's epicenter of marine biodiversity. Intended as an open-sourced event, the day is celebrated by individuals, organizations, and establishment concerned on the Coral Triangle. The Coral Triangle day was observed the first time on June 9, 2012, in conjunction with the World Oceans Day on June 8.

== Background ==
Coral Triangle is a geographical term that refers to a vast ocean expense located along the equator and the confluence of the Western Pacific and Indian Oceans. The region covers the exclusive economic zones of six countries: Indonesia, Malaysia, Philippines, Papua New Guinea, Solomon Islands, and East Timor (the "CT6" countries). It is considered as one of the three mega ecological complexes on Earth, together with the Congo Basin and the Amazon Rainforest.

There is a broad scientific consensus that the region represents the global epicenter of marine life abundance and diversity—with 76% of all known coral species, 37% of all known coral reef fish species, 53% of the world's coral reefs, the greatest extent of mangrove forests in the world, and spawning and juvenile growth areas for the world's largest tuna fishery. Moreover, the biogeographical conditions within the CT may also enable the region to maintain its exceptional productivity in the face of future impacts of climate change, making it potentially the world's most important "refuge" for marine life. These unparalleled marine and coastal living resources provide profound benefits to the 363 million people who reside within the six countries that compose the Coral Triangle, along with benefits to many millions more outside the region.

Today, the coastal and marine ecosystems in the Coral Triangle are under significant and increasing threat by the warming, acidifying and rising seas. Coral reefs have experienced mass bleaching, which threaten to degrade the important ecosystems. Over half the coral reefs are at high risk primarily from coastal development, overfishing, and unsustainable fishing practices. Since the marine resources are a principal source of income for the population, the downstream effects of losing these critical coastal ecosystems are enormous.

== History ==
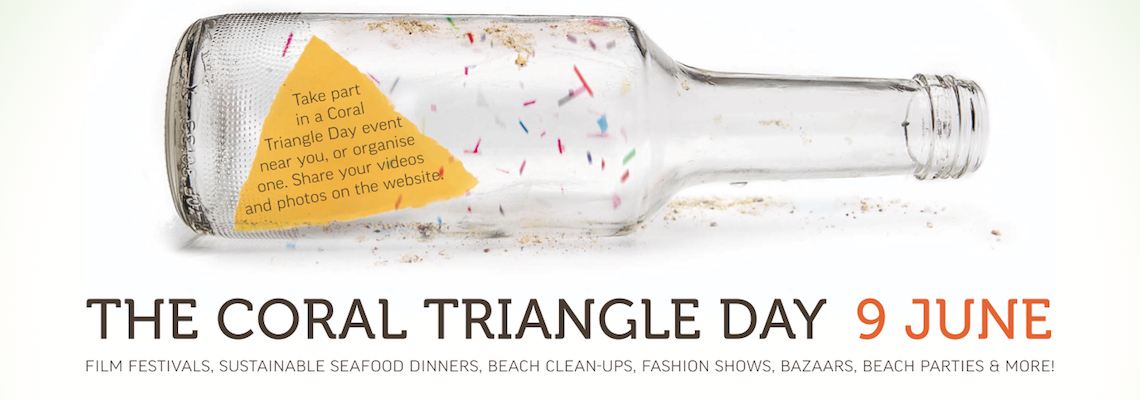
Coral Triangle Day 2013 Poster

The Coral Triangle Day was first held on June 9, 2012, as a regional interpretation of World Oceans Day. During the 8th Coral Triangle Initiative on Coral Reefs, Fisheries and Food Security (a multilateral partnership to safeguard the Coral Triangle's marine and coastal biological resources) Senior Official Meeting, member countries declared to designate the Coral Triangle Day to be held annually. It is, ever since, simultaneously celebrated by all Coral Triangle countries every year. It is celebrated through numerous activities including but not limited to beach clean-ups, sustainable seafood dinners and exhibitions, bazaars, and beach parties, among others. The intention is to carry the message of ocean conservation under the overall banner of the Coral Triangle Day.

Written in the decision document on Coral Triangle Day:

This regional interpretation of World Oceans Day was initiated to raise awareness on the Coral Triangle as a globally-significant eco-region, to highlight the importance of oceans in people’s lives and the need to protect them; highlight the conservation work being done by the governments, partners, and a diverse group of stakeholders in the region to help protect the Coral Triangle; and mobilize millions of supporters for the Coral Triangle.

== See also ==
- Coral Triangle
- Coral Triangle Initiative on Coral Reefs, Fisheries, and Food Security
