= Frankie Abernathy =

American reality television personality and purse designer (1981-2007)

- Abernathy from The Real World: San Diego
- Born: December 21, 1981; Kansas City, Missouri, U.S.
- Died: June 9, 2007 (aged 25); Shorewood, Wisconsin, U.S.
- Cause of death: Cystic fibrosis
- Occupation: Purse designer

Frankie Jo Abernathy (December 21, 1981 – June 9, 2007) was an American purse designer and reality television personality, known for her time as a cast member on MTV's The Real World: San Diego which was filmed in late 2003 and aired from January to June 2004. Hailing from Kansas City, Abernathy was the elder daughter of Abbie Hunter and Joe Abernathy. She had a younger sister named Mamie, and a stepfather, Perry Hunter. She attended Blue Springs High School in Blue Springs, Missouri.

== The Real World: San Diego ==
MTV's promotional materials described Abernathy as someone who "likes to shock people with her appearance, date bad boys, party all night and dreams of being an artist." She was known for her taste in punk rock music and her fondness for Hello Kitty.

The first housemate Abernathy greeted was Jacquese Smith, with whom she first entered the Real World house and with whom MTV believes she may have been the closest during their stay there. Abernathy had cystic fibrosis.

== After The Real World ==
After leaving the show in early 2004, Abernathy spent her time working at numerous retail outlets in Kansas City, working tattoo conventions with the Art Intensity Network, getting more tattoos, and spending time with her loved ones. She also appeared on the cover of the May 2005 issue of Prick, a tattoo magazine.

Abernathy moved to Shorewood, Wisconsin with her family in late 2006. She began designing purses forged from old vinyl records. According to her mother, winter is a difficult time for people with chronic lung disease, and the winter of 2006 was particularly problematic for Abernathy. Her illness had been worse than in prior winters and the family considered trying to get Abernathy qualified to appear on a lung transplant list.

Abernathy died June 9, 2007, in Shorewood, Wisconsin, from complications of cystic fibrosis. She was 25 years old. She was the second alumnus of The Real World to die, after Pedro Zamora. As with Zamora's struggle with AIDS, Abernathy is credited by MTV.com with helping to raise national awareness of cystic fibrosis and putting a face on the disease. Abernathy's housemate Jacquese Smith, with whom she was the closest, was particularly devastated by her death and by having not kept in touch with her, as was fellow housemate Jamie Chung. Abernathy's mother, Abbie Hunter, said about her time on the show:

Her experience on The Real World taught her about what she needed to do, and it helped other people as well. I know several people weren't aware of the cutting epidemic at the time…and I know several people wrote Frankie and thanked her. She was a different person for The Real World realm, and I think she touched a lot of people and made an impact on a lot of people's lives. That's what you want when you have a child—you hope they do that. I wish it had been in a different way, but I am proud of her, and as I said, she got a lot of personal growth out of her experience, and she was very fortunate to have had the experiences she did.

A scholarship was set up in her name at her alma mater, Blue Springs High School.
