= The Real World: San Diego (2004 season) =

Coordinates: 32°43′23″N 117°13′14″W

- Season 14
- The original cast of The Real World: San Diego
- Starring: Jamie Chung; Cameran Eubanks; Randy Barry; Frankie Abernathy; Brad Fiorenza; Robin Hibbard; Jacquese Smith; Charlie Dordevich
- No. of episodes: 26

Release
- Original network: MTV
- Original release: January 6 – June 29, 2004

Season chronology
- ← Previous; The Real World: Paris Next → The Real World: Philadelphia

The Real World: San Diego is the fourteenth season of MTV's reality television series The Real World, which focuses on a group of diverse strangers living together for several months in a different city each season, as cameras follow their lives and interpersonal relationships. It is the fourth season of The Real World to be filmed in the West Coast region of the United States (specifically in California) after The Real World: San Francisco, Los Angeles and Seattle.

The season featured a total of eight cast members over the course of the season, as one Frankie was replaced after she voluntarily left the show. The season was filmed from August 16 to December 14, 2003. The season premiered on January 6, 2004, and consisted of 26 episodes. This was the first of two seasons to be filmed in San Diego, the second being the twenty-sixth season. The premiere was watched by approximately 4 million viewers.

== Assignment ==
Almost every season of The Real World, beginning with its fifth season, has included the assignment of a season-long group job or task to the housemates, continued participation in which has been mandatory to remain part of the cast since the Back to New York season. The San Diego cast worked in San Diego Bay as crew members for Next Level Sailing on a boat named Stars & Stripes, which carried visitors daily. Before beginning their regular duties as tour guides, which included preparing yachts for excursions, piloting them in San Diego Bay, and providing maintenance, the cast had to undergo a course in sailing, and navigating the vessels. This created a problem for Frankie Abernathy, who has a phobia of large metal objects, such as boats, and is initially frightened by the sight of the harbor.

== The residence ==
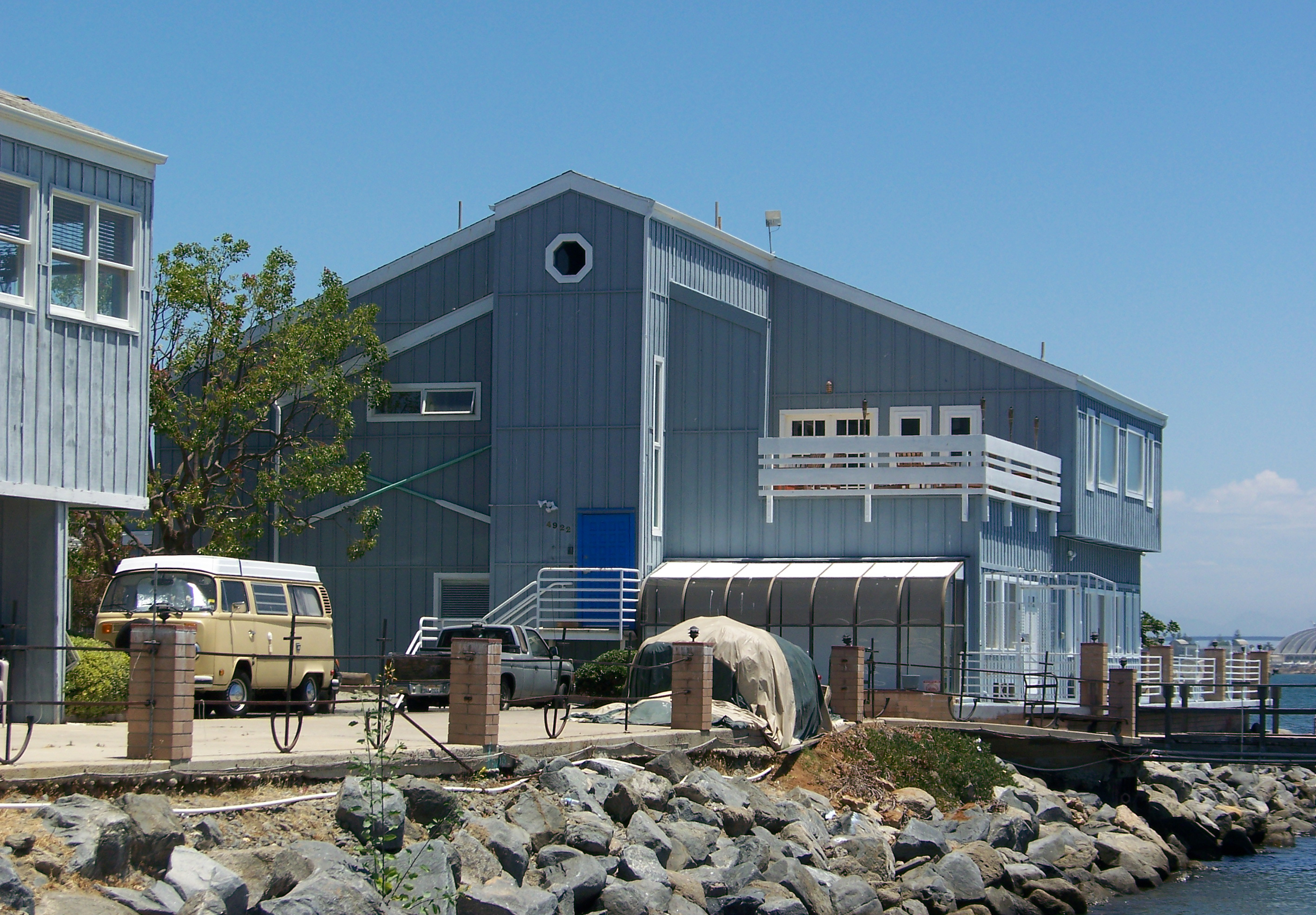
The North Harbor Drive house, where the cast resided.

The cast's residence was a custom-designed, two-story house at 4922 North Harbor Drive in San Diego. The house, formerly a Blue Crab Seafood restaurant and a marine supply company, sits on the edge of the southeast end of Driscoll's Wharf, overlooking America's Cup Harbor in Point Loma. MTV.com gives its size as 5,000 square feet (460 m^{2}), though realworldhouses.com gives it as 10,328 square feet (959.5 m^{2}). During filming of the series, the property included a sand volleyball court and basketball court.

== Cast ==
Cast member	Age^{1}	Hometown
Brad Fiorenza	22	Chicago, Illinois
Brad is an Italian-American from Chicago who has just graduated from Lewis University with an accounting degree. He enjoys extreme sports and motorcycles. MTV.com describes him as a "hunky, fun-loving daredevil."
Cameran Eubanks	19	Anderson, South Carolina
Cameran was born and raised in an upper-class family in Anderson, South Carolina, and enjoys playing pranks on people. She has had an on-and-off boyfriend for a year, but says that he is merely a "trophy". Her parents' divorce, which occurred when she was in high school, deeply affected her, and she continues to become emotional when speaking of it. MTV.com describes her as "warm, friendly and down to earth".
Frankie Abernathy	21	Kansas City, Missouri
Frankie is a certified masseuse and aspiring artist with a number of piercings, and a fondness for punk rock music and Hello Kitty. She was diagnosed with cystic fibrosis, a hereditary disease that affects the respiratory and immune systems, at the age of three, and although she spent most of her childhood and adolescence symptom-free, she experienced numerous hospital stays in her teens. She is a student of spiritual healing who paid for her education by working in a porn shop. MTV.com describes her as "extremely pretty" and "creative". Frankie has a phobia of large metal objects, including boats, which made the group assignment difficult for her. She leaves the house early, due to conflict with her housemates, and homesickness.
Jacquese Smith	19	Paterson, New Jersey
Jacquese was born in Paterson, New Jersey, and was forced to become the "man of the house" when his father left the family, learning how to take care of himself. MTV.com describes him as a motivated young man with "a quick wit and an even quicker tongue", and a "class clown" who uses his sense of humor to provide comic relief for his friends. He is also said to have a tenacious work ethic and drive, and is a positive influence on those in his life. The first housemate he greeted was Frankie, and the two of them first walked into the house together. They were perhaps the closest with one another during their stay there.
Jamie Chung	20	San Francisco, California
Jamie is a second-generation Korean-American woman raised by traditional parents in San Francisco. She works two jobs to pay her tuition, but also enjoys partying. According to mtv.com, Jamie's friends feel she does not have the best taste in men, and although she is very picky when choosing her dates, she tends to overlook obvious signs of trouble.
Randy Barry	24	Boston, Massachusetts
Randy is an industrial sculptor who is often found creating a new piece of artwork in his basement studio, and works as the head of security at an A-list Boston nightclub. MTV.com describes him as "creative, insightful, and charismatic". A single man, he is said to be easygoing and able to make friends and female admirers easily.
Robin Hibbard	22	Tampa, Florida
Robin is a single woman who was working at a Coyote Ugly Saloon when she was cast. She enjoys dancing. MTV.com describes her as a "spunky, energetic and gorgeous party girl", and "a genuine person who helps people break out of their own shells".
Charlie Dordevich	18	Belgrade, Serbia
Charlie is an 18-year-old guitarist and aspiring musician from Belgrade, Serbia. An outgoing person whose creative attempts to find fun often get him into trouble, his traditional parents enlisted him in a boarding school when he was twelve. He enjoys traveling because he doesn't like staying in the same place for too long. MTV.com describes Charlie as a free spirit who looks as if he "came straight out of the movie Dazed and Confused." Charlie moved into the house as a replacement for Frankie, after Frankie had moved out.

^Note 1: Age at the time of filming.

== Episodes ==
No. overall	No. in season	Title	Original release date
288	1	"Hello, San Diego!"	January 6, 2004
The gang settles into their digs in San Diego. The cast includes motorcycle enthusiast Brad, 22; Southern belle Cameran, 19; certified masseuse Frankie, 21; quick-witted Jacquese, 19; San Francisco native Jamie, 20, who felt ostracized at college; charismatic Randy, 24, who worked at a Boston nightclub; and Robin, 22, who worked as a bartender in Tampa.
289	2	"Rockin' the Relationship"	January 6, 2004
Frankie frets about her behavior with Brad on their first night in the house; Brad considers breaking up with his girlfriend.
290	3	"The "N" Word"	January 13, 2004
Jacquese is offended by the language Robin uses to get back at a black man who insulted her. Also: Frankie, Jaime and Jacquese feel like outcasts in the house.
291	4	"Boom Bazooka Joe!"	January 13, 2004
The roommates learn that their jobs will involve the ocean and a boat, which doesn't sit well with Jacquese, who can't swim, and with Frankie, who is afraid of boats. Randy and Robin become close.
292	5	"Pass or Fail"	January 20, 2004
The roommates prepare for a test on their boating skills. Cameran experiments with girl-on-girl kisses; and Brad shows the gals his private parts.
293	6	"San Diego Slammer"	January 27, 2004
Robin is arrested for assaulting a patron outside of a nightclub. Later that night, Brad is arrested for being intoxicated in public.
294	7	"Free At Last!"	February 3, 2004
The morning after their arrests, Brad is allowed to go with no charges, while Robin needs to post bail. Frankie's boyfriend suggests that they break up.
295	8	"Insult to Injury"	February 10, 2004
Frankie contemplates heading home early. While out clubbing, Robin becomes upset with Randy for dancing with other girls.
296	9	"Crossing the Line"	February 17, 2004
Frankie gets tipsy and flirtatious with her new friend Adam. Brad tries to kiss Cameran, but she rejects him.
297	10	"Excuses, Excuses"	February 24, 2004
Frankie frets that her boyfriend will dump her once he sees The Real World on TV; and admits that she has yet to tell him she has cystic fibrosis. The housemates go clubbing and Robin and Brad get into it on their way home.
298	11	"House of Fun"	March 2, 2004
Robin meets a Marine named Mike and has a talk with Randy about where they stand. Cameran, Frankie, and Jamie attend a party at a stylish mansion.
299	12	"Fakin' the Funk"	March 9, 2004
Brad's ex-girlfriend arrives for a visit, but the night before she's due, he goes out on the town and ends up sleeping it off in jail. Later, his ex becomes jealous of the attention he shows on some girls Randy brings home.
300	13	"Dentally Challenged"	March 16, 2004
The roommates' dislike for their job on the sailboat surfaces and causes them to be 45 minutes late for work. Frankie worries how the job is affecting her cystic fibrosis; and Randy dates a woman who has a false tooth.
301	14	"The Snake vs. The Mouse"	March 30, 2004
Frankie gets a pet python and a mice to feed it. But when the snake fails to eat the mouse, Robin decides to keep it as her own pet. Brad receives an e-mail from his folks asking him to move out once he returns home.
302	15	"Emotional Distress"	April 6, 2004
Frankie's roommates learn that she cuts herself in an effort to cope with emotional pain. The female roommates go to dinner with her to discuss it; and Frankie asks Jamie to accompany her to see a mental-health therapist.
303	16	"Don't Hate the Player..."	April 13, 2004
Brad hits it off with a gal he met at a bar, and brings her back to the house, where she stays the night. Cameran becomes upset with Brad for the one-night fling.
304	17	"Happy At Last"	April 20, 2004
Frankie's boyfriend from home, Dave, arrives for a visit. Frankie deals with Adam, whom she doesn't wish to upset out of fear that he might disrupt Dave's stay.
305	18	"Truth or... Dare!"	April 27, 2004
Randy arranges for the roommates to go on a camping trip, but Frankie decides to stay home instead. While camping, the roomies play truth or dare; and Brad and Cameran share a kiss. Once they return to San Diego, they learn that they have another trip to look forward to: they are going to Greece.
306	19	"Welcome to Paradise"	May 4, 2004
The roommates arrive in Greece, but Frankie is less than thrilled to be there with the others. Brad and Cameran enjoy a hot tub; and Frankie finds herself in the middle of a Robin-Cameran fight, only to be yelled at by Brad. The next day, she confronts the roommates about talking behind each other's backs.
307	20	"Who Are You?"	May 18, 2004
Randy's friends arrive for a visit; and he gets close with his friend Jessica. Robin and Mike fight after they've both had too much to drink.
308	21	"The End is Near"	May 25, 2004
Frankie's unhappiness continues, despite a visit from her family and she contemplates returning home either to clear her head or for good. Meanwhile, her sister confides in Cameran that Frankie wouldn't be happy at home either. Jamie's mother visits, and the trip brings the two closer.
309	22	"Goodbye Juliet"	June 1, 2004
Frankie, still unhappy with how her The Real World experience has evolved, decides to head home early. After she departs, the other roommates celebrate Halloween.
310	23	"And The Winner Is..."	June 8, 2004
The housemates choose Frankie's replacement from three candidates, whom they interview and then hang out with. Brad's girlfriend thinks something's going on between him and Cameran.
311	24	"Overboard"	June 15, 2004
Jacquese's mom visits and spurs him to contact his dad, who is estranged from him. Cameran and Robin avoid work through an ingenious plan.
312	25	"No Bonus For You"	June 22, 2004
Charlie's girlfriend visits, spurring him to skip work for the day and costing the others their $50 bonuses. In retaliation, Cameran breaks his guitar, which she later learns may cost $800 to repair.
313	26	"Farewell San Diego"	June 29, 2004
Robin's court case is resolved. While waiting to gain entry to a club, Brad is held up by several bouncers after he interferes with another bouncer who's questioning if Cameran's I.D. is legit.

== Rape allegation ==
A 22-year-old woman claimed she was raped in the Real World house sometime during the night of November 14, 2003 by an acquaintance of Real World cast member Randy Barry, identified in local reports as "Justin", who was staying at the house as a guest. The woman claimed the man bought her a drink at a downtown San Diego nightspot, and that she blacked out after drinking it. Cast member Jamie Chung found the woman lying naked on the bathroom floor of the Real World house as Justin emerged, saying, "I just hit that." That person then dressed the woman and moved her to the living room couch, where Chung, upon arriving home on the morning of November 15, found her. Chung then helped that other person move the woman to the downstairs guest bedroom. Chung and the camera crew woke the woman at 10:30 a.m. while cameras were rolling. Chung told the woman that she may have been sexually assaulted in the bathroom during the night, but the woman, according to Chung, appeared disoriented and had difficulty speaking. With the woman's help, Chung contacted a male friend of hers and arranged for her transportation home. Feeling pain in her genital region, the woman reported the incident to police on November 16, and a subsequent medical examination revealed abrasions on her vagina and anus. According to police, the woman believes her assailant drugged her, brought her back to the Real World house and then while she was unconscious, raped her in the bathroom, since that is the only place in the house where the show's cameras are off-limits.

Another cast member told police that he had seen the woman barely able to stand up in the bathroom, mumbling incoherently, and looking confused, according to the search warrant.

The police sexual assault unit began investigating the next day, November 17, but the Real World cast and crew had left on the cast's group trip to Mexico, and all film from November 14 and 15 had been shipped from the house to the production headquarters in Los Angeles. Kevin Lee, the on-site producer of show, told police he had not viewed the footage but that, after talking to the cast, believed the woman might have been raped, and confirmed that Justin was resident in the house at the time of the alleged assault. Lee agreed to supply the police with the consent forms and photo ID cards that listed who was in the house at the time of the incident, and gave them a tour of the house, allowing them to search the bathroom for evidence.

At the end of the tour, however, Lee received a phone call from Pam Naughton, an attorney representing Bunim-Murray Productions, which produces the show. Naughton refused to permit the police to search the bedrooms and stated that the producers would not turn over any documents or film until she personally reviewed them. The police then obtained a search warrant on November 18, and raided the house, confiscating the film-editing computer, the cast's e-mail computer, bedding, towels, videotapes, and other possible items of evidence. After examining hours of footage taped for the show and seizing evidence at the scene, police made no arrests, and the San Diego County District Attorney's office concluded there was not enough evidence to warrant any charges.

Nearly a month of footage from the season ended up on the cutting room floor due to the allegation. While Charlie Dordevich only appears in three episodes, he lived in the house almost as long as Frankie, who appeared in the first 23 episodes.

TV Guide critic J. Max Robins opined, "The sexual-assault charge is the most tragic event in a long list of disturbing incidents that have plagued The Real World since it debuted 12 years ago."

== After filming ==
Six months after the cast left the Real World house, all eight of them appeared to discuss their experiences both during and since their time on the show, 2 Punk Rock 4 This: The Real World San Diego Reunion, which premiered on July 9, 2004, and was hosted by Vanessa Minnillo.

Frankie Abernathy, who suffered from cystic fibrosis, died on June 9, 2007, at the age of 25.

At the 2008 The Real World Awards Bash, Jacquese and Robin won in the "Best Phonecall Gone Bad" category, Robin also took Home the award for "Best Brush with the Law" (Brad was nominated in the same category). Other nominees included Jamie and Cameran for "Hottest Female", Brad for "Hottest Male" and "Biggest Playa".

Jamie Chung went on to a career as an actress. Her early roles included appearances on TV shows such as Days of Our Lives and Veronica Mars, supporting parts in feature films like I Now Pronounce You Chuck and Larry, Sorority Row, and Grown Ups. She eventually moved onto larger roles, such as the lead in the ABC Family TV miniseries Samurai Girl, as one of the main cast members in the 2011 feature film Sucker Punch, and as Mulan in the TV show Once Upon a Time. Chung was a series regular, starring as Clarice Fong/Blink, in the TV series based on the X-Men franchise, The Gifted. She is regarded as the Real World alumna with the most successful media career. She married Bryan Greenberg in October, 2015.

Robin Hibbard became pregnant with her first child, Ethan, in 2009. He was followed by Raina, born on January 9, 2015.

Brad Fiorenza married Road Rules: Viewers' Revenge alumna Tori Hall on April 12, 2010. Together they have two children: John Brady Fiorenza (born August 4, 2011) and Chase Fiorenza (born January 13, 2015). The couple divorced in 2016.

Cameran Eubanks was a cast member on the Bravo reality television series Southern Charm for its first six seasons. In 2020, she announced her departure from the series. Eubanks and Jason Wimberly's first daughter, Palmer Corrine Wimberly, was born on November 11, 2017. The following year, she spoke about the reasons that led her to cease breastfeeding. In 2021, Eubanks released her first memoir, titled One Day You'll Thank Me.

=== The Challenge ===
Cast member	Seasons of The Challenge	Other appearances
Brad Fiorenza	Battle of the Sexes 2, The Inferno II, The Gauntlet 2, The Duel, The Gauntlet III, The Duel II, The Ruins, Cutthroat (2010), Vendettas, Final Reckoning, Battle of the Eras, Cutthroat (2026)	The Challenge: All Stars (season 2), The Challenge: All Stars (season 3), The Challenge: All Stars (season 4)
Cameran Eubanks	Battle of the Sexes 2, The Gauntlet 2	—N/a
Charlie Dordevich	—N/a	—N/a
Frankie Abernathy	—N/a	—N/a
Jacquese Smith	Battle of the Sexes 2	—N/a
Jamie Chung	The Inferno II	—N/a
Randy Barry	Battle of the Sexes 2, The Gauntlet 2	—N/a
Robin Hibbard	Battle of the Sexes 2, The Inferno II, The Gauntlet 2, The Duel, The Gauntlet III, The Island, The Duel II, Rivals, Battle of the Exes	—N/a

Note: Brad made an appearance on Battle for a New Champion for an elimination.
