= Kayhan Mortezavi =

Iranian film art director and production designer

- کیهان مرتضوی
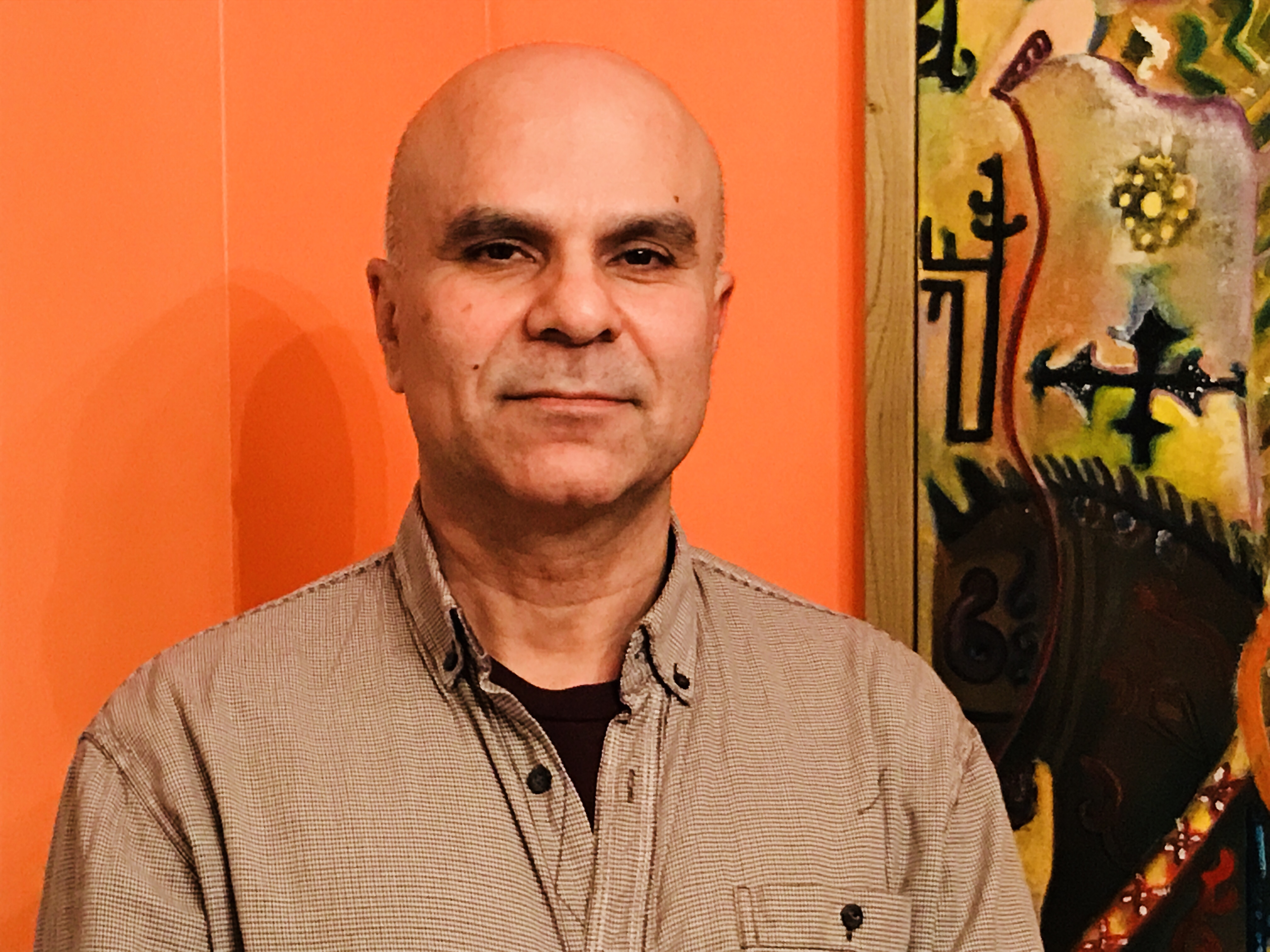
- Born: June 9, 1956 (age 69); Tehran
- Occupation: Production designer
- Years active: 1978–present
- Spouse: Mitra Ghavamian (1979–present)

Kayhan Mortezavi (Persian: کیهان مرتضوی; born 9 June 1956 in Tehran, Iran) is a prominent film art director/production designer, and director. He has also been a university professor at University of Tehran, Alzahra University, Tehran University of Art, and Iran Broadcasting University, (1982–1994). Kayhan Mortezavi has been nominated twice for the best production designer at Fajr International Film Festival (1989 and 1991), and won the award for the best TV art direction at Sima Festival - IRIB, 1992.

== Life ==
Kayhan Mortezavi is a graduate of theatre, with a BFA in Art Direction from Tehran University of Art, a MA in Philosophy of Art (Art-Research) from University of Tehran, and also a degree in Education form faculty of Education, York University - Toronto, Canada. He began his career as a theatre set designer in 1979, and as a film and TV Art director from 1982. He has worked as a production designer and director at various film, TV, and theatre productions in Iran, Canada, and USA.
