= List of United Nations observances =

This is a list of the United Nations (UN) observances. The list includes all types of observances (such as celebratory, commemorative, and awareness days or weeks).

The majority of observances have been established by resolutions of the United Nations General Assembly, although some have been designated by UN specialized agencies. These observances include many kinds of topic, all related to the UN main works, including peace, tobacco, discrimination, diseases, illegal drugs.

== Introduction ==
=== Reason for establishing observances ===
As the UN explained,

The existence of international days predates the establishment of the United Nations, but the UN has embraced them as a powerful advocacy tool. The United Nations observes designated days, weeks, years, and decades, each with a theme, or topic. By creating special observances, the United Nations promotes international awareness and action on these issues. Each international day offers many actors the opportunity to organize activities related to the theme of the day. Organizations and offices of the United Nations system, and most importantly, governments, civil society, the public and private sectors, schools, universities and, more generally, citizens, make an international day a springboard for awareness-raising actions.

== International Days and Weeks ==
International Days and Weeks
Date	Name	Description
January 4	World Braille Day	Giving attention on braille and people with visual impairment.
January 24	International Day of Education	
January 26	International Day of Clean Energy	
January 27	International Day of Commemoration in Memory of the Victims of the Holocaust	
January 28	International Day of Peaceful Coexistence	
February 1	World Interfaith Harmony Week, 1-7 February	
February 2	World Wetlands Day	
February 4	International Day of Human Fraternity	
February 6	International Day of Zero Tolerance to Female Genital Mutilation	
February 10	World Pulses Day	
February 10	International Day of the Arabian Leopard	
February 11	International Day of Women and Girls in Science	
February 12	International Day for the Prevention of Violent Extremism as and when Conducive to Terrorism	
February 13	World Radio Day	
February 17	Global Tourism Resilience Day	
February 20	World Day of Social Justice	
February 21	International Mother Language Day	
March 1	Zero Discrimination Day	
March 1	World Seagrass Day	
March 3	World Wildlife Day	
March 5	International Day for Disarmament and Non-Proliferation Awareness	
March 8	International Women's Day	
March 10	International Day of Women Judges	
March 15	International Day to Combat Islamophobia	
March 20	International Day of Happiness	
March 21	World Day for Glaciers	
March 21	International Day of Forests	
March 21	Week of Solidarity with the Peoples Struggling against Racism and Racial Discrimination, 21-27 March	
March 21	International Day for the Elimination of Racial Discrimination	
March 21	World Poetry Day	
March 21	International Day of Nowruz	
March 21	World Down Syndrome Day	
March 22	World Water Day	This day focuses on "the importance of freshwater", "raises awareness of the 2.2 billion people living without access to safe water", the IAH said.
March 23	World Meteorological Day	
March 24	World Tuberculosis Day	
March 24	International Day for the Right to the Truth Concerning Gross Human Rights Violations and for the Dignity of Victims	
March 25	International Day of Remembrance of the Victims of Slavery and the Transatlantic Slave Trade	
March 25	International Day of Solidarity with Detained and Missing Staff Members	
March 30	International Day of Zero Waste	
April 2	World Autism Awareness Day	
April 4	International Day for Mine Awareness and Assistance in Mine Action	
April 5	International Day of Conscience	
April 6	International Day of Sport for Development and Peace	
April 7	International Day of Reflection on the 1994 Rwanda Genocide	
April 7	World Health Day	
April 12	International Day of Human Space Flight	
April 14	World Chagas Disease Day	
April 15	International Wellness Day	
April 21	World Creativity and Innovation Day	
April 22	International Mother Earth Day	
April 23	International Girls in ICT Day	
April 23	World Book and Copyright Day	
April 24	World Immunization Week, 24-30 April	
April 24	International Day of Multilateralism and Diplomacy for Peace	
April 25	World Malaria Day	
April 25	International Delegate's Day	
April 26	International Chernobyl Disaster Remembrance Day	
April 26	World Intellectual Property Day	
April 28	World Day for Safety and Health at Work	
April 29	International Day in Memory of the Victims of Earthquakes	
April 30	International Jazz Day	
May 2	World Tuna Day	
May 3	World Press Freedom Day	
May 8	Time of Remembrance and Reconciliation for Those Who Lost Their Lives During the Second World War	
May 10	International Day of Argania	
May 10	World Migratory Bird Day (Note: UNEP)	
May 12	International Day of Plant Health (Note: WHO)	
Full Moon in May	Vesak, the Day of Full Moon	
May 15	International Day of Families	
May 16	International Day of Living Together in Peace	
May 16	International Day of Light	
May 17	World Telecommunication and Information Society Day	
May 19	World Fair Play Day	
May 20	World Bee Day	
May 21	World Day for Cultural Diversity	
May 21	International Tea Day	Tea is a kind of drink which may have the origin in northeast India, northern Myanmar and southwest China. Al Jazeera authors: Marium Ali and Hanna Duggal wrote, "From Tibetan po cha to a good old English breakfast brew, tea is considered a unifying and hospitable beverage." According to Tea & Coffee Trade Journal, China is the leading producer of tea with a production of 3.181 million tonnes.
May 22	International Day for Biological Diversity	
May 23	International Day to end Obstetric Fistula	
May 24	International Day of the Markhor	
May 25	World Football Day	
May 25	Week of Solidarity with the Peoples of Non-Self-Governing Territories, 25-31 May	
May 29	International Day of UN Peacekeepers	
May 30	International Day of Potato	
May 31	World No Tobacco Day	
June 1	Global Day of Parents	
June 3	World Bicycle Day	
June 4	International Day of Innocent Children Victims of Aggression	
June 5	World Environment Day	
June 5	International Day for the Fight against Illegal, Unreported and Unregulated Fishing	
June 7	World Food Safety Day	
June 8	World Oceans Day	
June 10	International Day for Dialogue among Civilizations	
June 11	International Day of Play	In March 2024, the United Nations declared a new International Day of Play, supported by 140 member states. This day is not literally just a day to play; it focuses on the child right. Poverty, conflict, displacement, and discrimination further impair children to play.
June 12	World Day Against Child Labour	The UN defines child labour as "work performed by children under the minimum legal age specified for that kind of work, or work that, because of its hazardous nature or detrimental conditions, is prohibited". In the report shows 138 million of children do not enjoy their fundamental rights, including around 54 million involved in hazardous work.
June 13	International Albinism Awareness Day	
June 14	World Blood Donor Day	
June 15	World Elder Abuse Awareness Day	
June 16	International Day of Family Remittances	
June 17	World Day to Combat Desertification and Drought	
June 18	Sustainable Gastronomy Day	
June 18	International Day for Countering Hate Speech	
June 19	International Day for the Elimination of Sexual Violence in Conflict	
June 20	World Refugee Day	
June 21	International Day of Yoga	
June 21	International Day of the Celebration of the Solstice	
June 23	United Nations Public Service Day	
June 23	International Widows Day	
June 24	International Day of Women in Diplomacy	
June 25	Day of the Seafarer	
June 26	International Day Against Drug Abuse and Illicit Trafficking	
June 26	United Nations International Day in Support of Victims of Torture	
June 27	International Day of Deafblindness	
June 27	Micro-, Small and Medium-sized Enterprises Day	
June 29	International Day of the Tropics	
June 30	International Asteroid Day	
June 30	International Day of Parliamentarism	
First Saturday in July	International Cooperative Day	
July 6	World Rural Development Day	
July 11	International Day of Reflection and Commemoration of the 1995 Genocide in Srebrenica	
July 11	World Population Day	
July 11	World Horse Day	
July 12	International Day of Combating Sand and Dust Storms	
July 12	International Day of Hope	
July 15	World Youth Skills Day	
July 18	Nelson Mandela International Day	
July 20	World Chess Day	
July 20	International Moon Day	
July 25	International Day of Women and Girls of African Descent	
July 25	World Drowning Prevention Day	
July 25	International Day for Judicial Well-being	
July 28	World Hepatitis Day	
July 30	International Day of Friendship	
July 30	World Day against Trafficking in Persons	
August 1	World Breastfeeding Week, 1-7 August	
August 6	International Day of Awareness of the Special Development Needs and Challenges of Landlocked Developing Countries	
August 9	International Day of the World's Indigenous Peoples	
August 11	World Steelpan Day	
August 12	International Youth Day	
August 19	World Humanitarian Day	
August 21	International Day of Remembrance and Tribute to the Victims of Terrorism	
August 22	International Day Commemorating the Victims of Acts of Violence Based on Religion or Belief	
August 23	International Day for the Remembrance of the Slave Trade and its Abolition	
August 27	World Lake Day	
August 29	International Day against Nuclear Tests	
August 30	International Day of the Victims of Enforced Disappearances	
August 31	International Day for People of African Descent	
September 5	International Day of Charity	
September 5	International Day of the World's Indigenous Women and Girls	
September 7	International Day of Clean Air for Blue Skies	
September 7	International Day of Police Cooperation	
September 7	World Duchenne Awareness Day	
September 8	International Literacy Day	
September 9	International Day to Protect Education from Attack	
September 12	United Nations Day for South-South Cooperation	
September 15	International Day of Democracy	
September 16	International Day of Science, Technology and Innovation for the South	
September 16	International Day for Interventional Cardiology	
September 16	International Day for the Preservation of the Ozone Layer	
September 17	World Patient Safety Day	
September 18	International Equal Pay Day	
September 20	World Cleanup Day	
September 21	International Day of Peace	
September 23	International Day of Sign Languages	
September 24	World Maritime Day	
September 26	International Day for the Total Elimination of Nuclear Weapons	
September 27	World Tourism Day	
September 28	International Day for Universal Access to Information	
September 29	International Day of Awareness of Food Loss and Waste	
First Monday in October	World Habitat Day	
October 1	International Coffee Day	
October 1	International Day of Older Persons	
October 2	International Day of Non-Violence	Birthday of Mahatma Gandhi
October 4	World Space Week, 4-10 October	
October 5	World Teachers' Day	
October 7	World Cotton Day	
October 9	World Post Day	
October 9	World Migratory Bird Day	
October 10	World Mental Health Day	
October 11	International Day of the Girl Child	
October 13	International Day for Disaster Risk Reduction	
October 15	International Day of Rural Women	
October 16	World Food Day	
October 17	International Day for the Eradication of Poverty	
October 23	International Day of the Snow Leopard	
October 24	Disarmament Week, 24-30 October	
October 24	United Nations Day	
October 24	World Development Information Day	
October 24	Global Media and Information Literacy Week, 24-31 October	
October 27	World Day for Audiovisual Heritage	
October 29	International Day of Care and Support	
October 31	World Cities Day	
First Thursday in November	International Day Against Violence and Bullying at School, Including Cyberbullying	
November 2	International Day to End Impunity for Crimes against Journalists	
November 5	World Tsunami Awareness Day	
November 6	International Day for Preventing the Exploitation of the Environment in War and Armed Conflict	
November 9	International Week of Science and Peace, 9-15 November	
November 10	World Science Day for Peace and Development	
November 14	World Diabetes Day	
November 15	International Day for the Prevention of and Fight against All Forms of Transnational Organized Crime	
Third Thursday in November	World Philosophy Day	
Third Sunday in November	World Day of Remembrance for Road Traffic Victims	
November 16	International Day of the Mediterranean Diet	
November 16	International Day for Tolerance	
November 18	World Antimicrobial Resistance Awareness Week, 18-24 November	
November 18	World Day for the Prevention of and Healing from Child Sexual Exploitation, Abuse and Violence	
November 19	World Toilet Day	
November 20	Africa Industrialization Day	
November 20	World Children's Day	
November 21	World Television Day	
November 24	World Conjoined Twins Day	
November 25	International Day for the Elimination of Violence Against Women	
November 27	International Day for the Elimination of Child, Early and Forced Marriage	
November 26	World Sustainable Transport Day	
November 29	International Day of Solidarity with the Palestinian People	
November 30	Day of Remembrance for all Victims of Chemical Warfare	
December 1	World AIDS Day	
December 2	International Day for the Abolition of Slavery	
December 3	International Day of Persons with Disabilities	
December 4	International Day of Banks	
December 4	International Day Against Unilateral Coercive Measures	
December 5	International Volunteer Day for Economic and Social Development	
December 5	World Soil Day	
December 7	International Civil Aviation Day	
December 9	International Day of Commemoration and Dignity of the Victims of the Crime of Genocide and of the Prevention of this Crime	
December 9	International Anti-Corruption Day	
December 10	Human Rights Day	
December 11	International Mountain Day	
December 12	International Day of Neutrality	
December 12	Universal Health Coverage Day	
December 14	International Day against Colonialism in All its Forms and Manifestations	
December 16	International Day of the Belt and Boad	
December 18	International Migrants Day	
December 20	International Human Solidarity Day	
December 21	World Meditation Day	
December 21	World Basketball Day	
December 24	International Anti-Cybercrime Day	
December 27	International Day of Epidemic Preparedness	

=== Six Language Days ===
These six languages are the official languages of the UN.

Date	Language	Rationale	Ref.
March 20	French	day when OIF (was named l'Agence de coopération culturelle et technique (ACCT)) established	
April 20	Chinese	Chinese jieqi Guyu	
April 23	English	birth of William Shakespeare	
April 23	Spanish	death of Miguel de Cervantes	
June 6	Russian	birth of Pushkin (Russian: А. С. Пушкин)	
December 18	Arabic	the day when Arabic became an official language in UN	

=== Other language-related days ===
Date	Name	Rationale	Ref.
February 21	International Mother Language Day	Main article: Bangladesh Language Movement This day is advised by Bangladesh.	
September 30	International Translation Day	The feast of St. Jerome, the Bible translator, who is considered the patron saint of translators.	

== International Years ==
International Years
Year	Name	Ref.
2008	International Year of Languages	
2019	International Year of Indigenous Languages	
2022	International Year of Sustainable Mountain Development	
2023	International Year of Dialogue as a Guarantee of Peace	
2023	International Year of Millets	
2024	International Year of Camelids	
2025	International Year of Quantum Science and Technology	
2025	International Year of Cooperatives	
2025	International Year of Glaciers' Preservation	
2025	International Year of Peace and Trust	
2026	International Year of the Woman Farmer	
2026	International Year of Volunteers for Sustainable Development	
2026	International Year of Rangelands and Pastoralists	
2027	International Year of Sustainable and Resilient Tourism	
2029	International Year of Asteroid Awareness and Planetary Defence	

== International Decades ==
International Decades
Year	Decade	Ref.
2025–2034	Second International Decade for People of African Descent	
2026-2035	United Nations Decade of Sustainable Transport	
2027–2036	United Nations Decade for Afforestation and Reforestation in line with Sustainable Forest Management	

== See also ==
- UNESCO International Days

== Footnotes ==
These are the labels for the observances in specific subdivisions of the UN including World Health Organisation.
