= Kazinag Peak =

Mountain in India

- Location within Jammu and Kashmir Location within India

Highest point
- Elevation: 4,574 m (15,007 ft)
- Coordinates: 34.5°N 74.0°E

Geography
- Location: Jammu and Kashmir, India
- Parent range: Pir Panjal Range

Geology
- Mountain type: Mountain

Kazinag Peak is a mountain with peak elevation of 4,574 metres (15,007 ft) meters from sea level, located in the uri to Dangiwacha of district baramulla to kupwara, Jammu and Kashmir in India. It forms part of the Line of Control between Pakistan and India.

On top stands the historic Kazinag spring, Satkhol Nag and Kazinag Glacier which provides water to the Mawar, Humal stream and Vig . It usually remains snow clad throughout the year. It is home to Markhor, an endangered species of mountain goat.
