= Design for Good =

Global non-profit alliance

- Founded: April 21, 2022; 4 years ago
- Type: Non-profit
- Purpose: Sustainable development goals, design, collaboration
- Key people: Ben Sheppard (Chair); Nick de Leon (Executive, Royal College of Art); Sean Carney (former Chief Design Officer, Philips); Gilbert Houngbo (Chair – UN Water, Director-General – UN International Labour Organisation); John Maeda (VP, Microsoft); Sandy Speicher (former CEO, IDEO)
- Website: designforgood.org

Design for Good is a global non-profit alliance, aiming to deliver direct and measurable Environmental, social, and corporate governance (ESG) impact against the United Nations' Sustainable Development Goals (SDGs). The alliance was established in 2022, and its founding members include General Mills, Logitech, LIXIL, McKinsey & Company, Microsoft led by Xbox, Nedbank, Nestlé, PepsiCo, Philips, and the Royal College of Art.

== History ==
Design for Good was first created by a group of senior design leaders. This group was co-founded by Ben Sheppard, a partner from McKinsey & Company.

By December 2021, Design for Good was registered as an independent not-for-profit organization in the United Kingdom. On March 22, 2022 (World Water Day), the founding ten alliance members signed up to work together: General Mills, LIXIL, Logitech, McKinsey & Company, Microsoft led by Xbox, Nedbank, Nestlé, PepsiCo, Philips, and the Royal College of Art.

On April 21, 2022 (World Innovation Day), Design for Good publicly launched. By the summer of 2022, The first cohort of 600+ designers started working together.

== Structure and leadership ==
Design for Good is an independent non-profit, governed by a board of trustees that includes Ben Sheppard (chair), Nick de Leon (executive, Royal College of Art), Sean Carney (former chief design officer, Philips), Gilbert Houngbo (chair – UN Water, director-general – UN International Labour Organisation), John Maeda (VP, Microsoft) and Sandy Speicher (former CEO, IDEO).

The organization's senior advisory council is composed of senior leaders from each founding alliance member. As of March 2023, this list comprises:

- Teman Evans (Chief Design Officer, General Mills)
- Paul Flowers (Chief Design Officer, LIXIL)
- Alastair Curtis (Chief Design Officer, Logitech)
- Paul Jenkins (Senior Partner, McKinsey & Company)
- John Snavely (Chief Design Officer, Xbox)
- Terry Behan(Chief Design Officer, Nedbank)
- Ximena O'Reilly (Chief Design Officer, Nestlé)
- Mauro Porcini (Chief Design Officer, PepsiCo)
- Roger Rohatgi (Chief Design Officer, BP)
- Simona Rocchi (Senior Director Design for Sustainability & Innovation, Philips)
- Paul Anderson (Professor, Royal College of Arts)

== Projects and initiatives ==
Design for Good focuses on one of the United Nations' Sustainable Development Goals each year. In 2022, the alliance concentrated on SDG 6: Clean Water and Sanitation In the first cohort of 600+ designers, ranging across:

- Access to clean water
- Sustainable water management
- Water pollution
- Conservation of wetlands
- Personal Hygiene
- Sanitation

They unveiled 30 work-in-progress projects in March 2023.
