= Dutch corvette Scipio (1784) =

Corvette of the Dutch navy

History

Dutch Republic & Batavian Republic
- Name: Scipio
- Ordered: 1781 (Note: Jaarboekje and Van Maanen. Winfield says 1797.)
- Builder: F. v. Zwijndregt, Rotterdam
- Launched: 1784
- Captured: 1807 (Note: Winfield and Van Maanen. Jaarboekje says 1800.)

United Kingdom
- Name: Scipio
- Acquired: 1807 by capture
- Renamed: HMS Samarang on 19 January 1808 (officially)
- Honours and awards: Naval General Service Medal with clasp "Java"
- Fate: Sold 1814

United Kingdom
- Name: Samarang
- Owner: 1815:Bruce Fawcett & Co.; 1823:Remington, Crawford, & Co.
- Acquired: 1814 by purchase
- Fate: Broken up August 1833

General characteristics
- Type: corvette
- Tons burthen: 405, or 406, or 408 (bm)
- Length: 130 voet (Note: All linear measurements are in Amsterdam feet (voet) of 11 Amsterdam inches (duim) (see Dutch units of measurement). The Amsterdam foot is about 8% shorter than an English foot. The data is from the Rotterdams jaarboekje.) (Note: Van Maanen gives the length as 122'. Winfield echoes the Van Maanen measurements.)
- Beam: 30 voet (Note: Van Maanen and Winfield give the beam as 30'.)
- Draught: 17 voet 1/4 duim (Note: Van Maanen. Winfield says 17'1/2")
- Depth of hold: 12 voet 8/11 duim
- Propulsion: Sails
- Complement: Dutch service:120-150; British service:121
- Armament: Dutch service: 18-24 guns; British service: 16 × 32-pounder carronades + 2 × 9-pounder guns

Scipio was a corvette of the Dutch States Navy launched in 1784. She convoyed Dutch East Indiamen between the Cape of Good Hope and Europe until HMS Psyché captured her at Samarang in 1807. The British Royal Navy initially referred to her as HMS Scipio, but then renamed her to HMS Samarang in 1808. She was not commissioned in the Royal Navy. She was instrumental in the capture of Amboyna and especially Pulo Ay, and participated in the invasion of Java (1811). She was sold at Bombay in 1814. She then entered mercantile service, sailing between Liverpool and India until 1827. She became an opium trader sailing between India and Canton, and was broken up near Hong Kong in August 1833.

== Dutch service ==
In 1791 Scipio was under the command of Captain Cornelius de Jong van Rodenburgh, who sailed her to Cape of Good Hope, in company with the Dutch naval brig Komeet, leaving on 17 December 1791. Scipio arrived on 27 March 1792 and Komeet arrived on 4 April. Scipio took a convoy of Dutch East Indiamen back to the Netherlands, leaving on 31 May 1793. He then returned to the Cape.

On 18 May 1795, Komeet, under the command of Captain-Lieutenant Mynheer Claris, and Scipio, under the command of de Jong, set out from Table Bay with a convoy of sixteen East Indiamen, for Europe. Bad weather forced eight Indiamen back to the Cape. These eight sailed again on 22 May, but near Saint Helena they encountered British warships, which had heard that France had overrun the Netherlands and that the Batavian Republic was now a French ally. The British warships captured the Dutch vessels on 14 June and sent them to the River Shannon in Ireland. (Note: Actually, the British squadron consisted of the East Indiaman General Goddard, the 64-gun third rate Sceptre, and the packet ship Swallow. They captured Hougly on 10 June, and the remaining seven Dutch vessels on 14 June, without any casualties on either side. One of the Dutch vessels, Surcheance, was lost on the way to England. Another, Zeelelie, escaped and wrecked off the Scilly Islands.) The remaining eight Indiamen, which had sailed on 18 May together with their two escorts, and a private Dutch ship from the Cape, the whaler Herstilder, sailed on. The Dutch captains decide to avoid the Channel and instead sail via the Shetland Islands to ports in then-neutral Norway.

On 28 August 1795, the convoy encountered HMS Unicorn, in company with HMS Diana and HMS Seahorse. Diana captured the Dutch East Indiaman Kromhout, Cromhout or Crumhout. Cromhout's capture resulted in at least £40,000 in prize money to be distributed among her captors. Seahorse captured Herstilder. Then Unicorn parted company with the rest of the squadron and after a chase of 13 hours captured Comet (Komeet). She was only four years old, in excellent condition, and armed with 18 English 9-pounder guns. She was provisioned with water and food for 110 men for a nine-month cruise. The Royal Navy took her into service as Comeet, shortly thereafter renamed to Penguin.

Scipio escorted the remaining Indiamen into Norwegian waters, which they reached on 22 September. Scipio and three of the Indiamen arrived at Trondheim on 6 October. The remaining Indiamen went to Bergen and Ålesund. Scipio remained at Trondheim over winter and into spring. de Jong received orders to sail Scipio to Bergen. (The Dutch merchants remained at the ports they had reached. There they sold their cargoes and converted their vessels to neutral flags. Scipio could not escape Bergen, so de Jong was ordered to return to Holland overland, which he did, taking with him only his servant and a lieutenant.

In 1802 Scipio was under the command of Captain-Lieutenant Jan Hendrick Carrega. After the Treaty of Amiens she was in the squadron under Admiral Jan Willem de Winter that sailed to the Mediterranean in May 1802 to end the Tripoli pirate depredations by negotiating a treaty of peace with the Tripolitan government. The squadron visited Tunis, Algiers, and Tripoli. It was at Ferrol in May 1803 and then sailed for Holland on 16 June. In 1803 Scipio was transferred to the East Indies and on 29 November she reached the Cape of Good Hope.

=== Capture ===
Captain Fleetwood Pellew took command of Psyché in 1807. His father, Rear-Admiral Sir Edward Pellew, "Commander in Chief of His Majesty's Ships and Vessels in the East Indies", sent Psyché and Caroline to reconnoitre the port of Surabaya.

On 30 August Psyché and Caroline captured a ship from Batavia and from her learned the disposition of the Dutch navy in the area. Psyché proceeded to Samarang while Caroline pursued another vessel. Psyché arrived at Samarang at midnight and next morning her boats captured and brought out from under the fire of shore batteries an armed 8-gun schooner and a large merchant brig. However, Psyché had seen three more Dutch vessels, one of them a warship, and so Pellew destroyed the two captured vessels and at mid-day set out after the three other vessels.

By 3:30 on 1 September Psyché had caught up with the Dutch vessels and run them ashore. She went as close as the water depth would allow, anchored and exchanged fire with them. All three surrendered quickly. One that she captured was the 24-gun corvette Scipio, which had a crew of 150 men. Scipio was badly shot up and Carrega had been mortally wounded. The largest armed merchant ship was Resolutie, of 700 tons. She had a valuable cargo and as passengers the colours and staff of the Dutch 23rd European Battalion. The third vessel was the brig Ceres, of 12 guns and 70 men. Pellew had too few men to be able to deal with the prisoners so he paroled the officers to the governor of Samarang and gave up all the other men against a receipt.

== British service ==
Scipio was bought into the Royal Navy for £4,725. A survey by a committee of impartial builders and carpenters established the price.

By November 1807 Scipio, since (unofficially) renamed to Samarang, was under the command of Lieutenant Richard Buck, formerly of Culloden. On 20 November Samarang sailed from Malacca as part of the squadron under Sir Edward Pellew that aimed to attack Dutch forces on Java. They arrived at Point Panka on 5 December. After negotiating the Straits of Madura, and taking fire from a Dutch shore battery at Sambelangan on Madura Island, the British arrived at Griessie on the next day.

When they entered the harbour there, they found that the Dutch had already scuttled their ships of the line and some other vessels. Unable to remove the ships, Pellew ordered their remains burnt, while British landing parties spread throughout the town, burning the military stores and destroying the cannon that had been removed from the ship. Another landing party took possession of the remains of the battery at Sambelangan and demolished it. British operations were complete by 11 December and Pellew then ordered the squadron to withdraw and return to India. Buck received a promotion to Commander on 28 December 1807.

Lieutenant Richard Spencer of Cornwallis received promotion to Commander on 8 April 1808 and was appointed to Samarang. However, he did not join her until 23 November.

In February 1810 Samarang was part of a squadron under Captain Edward Tucker, of the frigate Dover, together with the frigate Cornwallis, Captain William Augustus Montagu. Their objective was the island of Amboyna. On their way, on 6 February Dover captured the Dutch brig-of-war Rambang; Samarang shared in the prize money by agreement.

The British launched their attack on 16 February capturing one battery that overlooked the port, the city of Ambon, and Fort Victoria. They then took another battery. During the night, Samarang landed forty men, who were joined by two field pieces from Dover. These joined in the bombardment of Fort Victoria from the two captured batteries. On 18 February the town capitulated. British casualties were extremely light, with only three dead, one of whom was a marine from Samarang.

During the campaign the British captured several Dutch vessels. One was the Dutch brig Mandurese, Captain Guasteranus. She had 12 guns. She was one of three vessels sunk in the inner harbor of Amboyna. However, the British raised her after the island surrendered. They took her into service as Mandarin. (Note: In January 1816, Dover, Cornwallis, and Samarang received a last payment of prize money for Amboyna and the vessels captured there. A first-class share was worth £991 13s 9d; a sixth-class share was worth £9 2s 3d.) (Note: A payment for certain public property captured on and around Amboyna was also large. A first-class share was worth £1,637 6d; a sixth-class share was worth £15 10 1/2d.) From Amboyna, the squadron went on to capture the islands of Saparua, Harouka, Nasso-Laut, Buru, and Manipa.

After the attack on Amboyna, Spencer sailed Samarang to the island of Pulo Ay (or Pulo Ai), in the Banda Islands. There he conducted a successful and bloodless attack on Fort Revenge. It capitulated and he took the garrison prisoner, and captured the ordnance and public property. Spencer disguised Samarang to look like a Dutch merchant vessel, which fooled the fort's commander, enabling Spencer to take the fort by surprise. The Dutch commander committed suicide by taking poison after he realized that he had surrendered to what was a relatively weak British force.

Next, Samarang captured the Dutch brig Recruiter on 28 March, when she arrived off Pulo Ay. She was armed with 12 guns and had a crew of 50 men under the command of Captain D. Hegenheard (or Hegenhoerd). She had on board 10,000 dollars, the payroll for the Dutch garrison at Banda Neira, provisions, and a doctor, nurse, and 20 infants, on their way to conduct a vaccination campaign. Samarang shared the prize money by agreement with Dover and Cornwallis.

Between 29 April and 18 May, Dover, Cornwallis, and Samarang captured Engelina and Koukiko. Six months later, between 13 and 20 September, Blanche and Samarang captured four junks: Kemingsing, Keminguan, Teinpochy, and Kemptionsing. Four days later, Blanche captured a Dutch brig; Samarang shared by agreement.

Spencer was made post captain on 25 July. On 18 September, at Port Cornwallis in the Andaman Islands, Spencer left Samarang to take command of Blanche and Commander Joseph Drury replaced him on Samarang. The day before Spencer left Samarang the petty officers and men of the ship's company presented Spencer with a letter in which they thanked him for his ..."fatherly conduct and universal attention to everything conducive to their health and comfort...", and asking his help in arranging for them to commission a sword worth 100 guineas for them to present to him.

On 28 February 1811, Samarang and Barracouta captured the Beschuyter Wind. (Note: A first-class share of the prize money was worth £27 11s 11 3/4d; a sixth-class share was worth 8s 5 1/4d.)

Next Samarang participated in the invasion of Java. (Note: The Admiral and the Commodore each received £7,724 2s 8 1/2d. A first-class share was worth £926 17s 4 1/2d; a sixth-class share was worth £9 11d.) In 1847 the Admiralty awarded the Naval General Service Medal with clasp "Java" to the surviving claimants from the campaign.

In August 1812, William Case was promoted to Commander and given command of Samarang. He sailed her from Madras to Australia, arriving at Port Jackson on 26 November. The object of the voyage was to deliver 40,000 Spanish dollars (worth £10,000) for use in the colony, which was short any money. (Note: Governor Macquarie had the centers of each of the dollars cut out, and the two resulting coins restamped and milled, using dies cut by a local silversmith. These became known as "Holey dollars" and "Dumps", and constituted two denominations, the larger of 5 shillings and the smaller of 15 pence, or together 25% more than their original value. By making the coins more valuable within New South Wales than outside, Macquarie discouraged their re-export.) Case and Governor Lachlan Macquarie got into arguments over several issues. After Samarang left Port Jackson on 7 January 1813 it was discovered that several convicts were missing. When she returned the next day, having developed many leaks requiring repairs, it was discovered that she had impressed (or recruited) the convicts. Macquarie demanded their return, which Case declined, pointing out that Macquarie had no authority over him. In August Samarang fired on the brig Governor Macquarie for failing to identify herself and for not rendering proper honours to a vessel of the Royal Navy when the brig was leaving the harbour. Case then detained the brig on the grounds that she might be harbouring deserters from Samarang, and impressed six of the brig's crew. There were also a number of incidents on shore involving Samarang's officers and crew.

Samarang left Port Jackson on 14 October but again had to return. (Note: One of the owners of Governor Macquarie was the British captain Eber Bunker. On 16 October 1814 he would sail the re-captured whaler Seringapatam to England at Macquarie's request.) She finally left sometime in November.

Samarang was sold at Bombay on 24 March 1814.

== Mercantile service ==
The British merchant Bruce Fawcett purchased Samarang. She sailed to England and was registered there, first appearing in Lloyd's Register in 1815 with master F. Gover, owner "Bruce & Co.", and trade Île de France (Mauritius).

In 1813 the British East India Company (EIC) had lost its monopoly on trade between Britain and India, and henceforth vessels could apply for a license from the EIC to engage in the trade. Samarang was the first Bombay ship to do so. Her owners applied for a licence on 12 October and received it on 14 October. Thereafter she traded between Liverpool and India.

Samarang, John Gower, master, was on an 1823 list of vessels registered at Bombay. In 1824 she was at Lintin Island, one of several vessels anchored there, out of the jurisdiction of the Chinese authorities at Canton. At the time she was described as an English opium ship.

Samarang last appeared in Lloyd's Register in 1826 with J.K. Duarte (or Durant), master, and Bruce & Co., owner.

However, a list of vessels registered at Bombay in 1829 showed Samarang, "Java prize, 1819", with John Gower, master, and Remington, Crawford, and Co., owners.

== Fate: the Samarang affair ==
On 7 August 1833 Captain Grant, the marine superintendent for Jardine Matheson & Co., had Samarang pulled up on the beach at Tsinkeo Bay and broken up. Ten days later, a group of villagers from Keeow village arrived with pikes and other makeshift arms and took away some of the copper and iron salvaged from Samarang. In the subsequent melee, the British seized a local, but released him when he agreed to return to his village and retrieve the stolen materials. A few days after that, the villagers came again to raid the salvage. In the altercation that followed a seacunny disappeared, believed kidnapped by the villagers, or killed by them. Grant organized a force from Hercules and the other opium ships at anchor and attacked the village. Gunfire ensued as the villagers fired some cannon; the only major casualty was a villager, who was killed. Captain Grant, working on the basis of "A life for a life", was willing to let matters rest at that. However, an official inquiry resulted that took some time to smooth over the affair, with the assistance of a made up story and some bribes. For a slightly different account see Karsh.
