= International Year of Pulses =

Logo of International Year of Pulses 2016

2016 was declared as the International Year of Pulses by the sixty-eighth session of the United Nations General Assembly on December 20, 2013. The Food and Agriculture Organization (FAO) of the United Nations has been nominated to declare a year for pulses, more commonly known as legumes.

== Purpose ==
The FAO used the International Year of Pulses to make people more aware of the nutritional value of pulses, of their contribution to sustainability, and more reliable food. The year was used to facilitate cooperation within food production systems to use protein in pulses better. It promoted production of pulses worldwide, improved knowledge about crop rotation and improved trade in pulses.

The IYP 2016 heightened public awareness of the nutritional benefits of pulses as part of sustainable food production aimed towards food security and nutrition. The Year created a unique opportunity to encourage connections throughout the food chain that would better utilize pulse-based proteins, further global production of pulses, better utilize crop rotations and address the challenges in the trade of pulses. Diet is an important contributor to health, and to disease. Most countries face nutritional problems, from undernutrition and micronutrient deficiencies to obesity and diet-related diseases (such as type 2 diabetes and certain types of cancer), or a mix of these. Pulses are a nutrient-rich food that as part of a healthy diet can help fight malnutrition in both developed and developing countries.

The United Nations Food and Agriculture Organization (FAO) used the Year to help raise awareness globally of the many benefits of pulses, such as beans, lentils and chickpeas.

In 2019, the General Assembly proclaimed 10 February as the World Pulses Day.

== Importance of pulses ==
Pulses are beans and peas that are harvested dry. Examples are lentils, chickpeas, pinto beans, and kidney beans.

1. Pulses provide a vital source of plant-based proteins and amino acids for people, thereby ensuring food security.
2. As part of a healthy diet high in fiber, pulses fight obesity.
3. Pulses also prevent and help manage chronic diseases such as diabetes, coronary conditions, and cancer.
4. Pulses are an important source of plant-based protein for livestock.
5. Pulses pull nitrogen from the air into the soil, increasing soil fertility.
6. Pulses use less water than most other protein crops, making them a sustainable agricultural choice.
