= National Day of Remembrance for Victims of Terrorism =

Canadian observance on June 23

The National Day of Remembrance for Victims of Terrorism is observed in memory of those who lost their lives to acts of terror in Canada and abroad. Taking place every year on June 23, it marks the anniversary of the bombing of Air India Flight 182 off the coast of Ireland.

On this day, flags across Canada are flown at half-mast to honour the victims of the bombing, as well as other acts of terrorist violence that have taken lives of Canadians.

The National Day of Remembrance for Victims of Terrorism was proclaimed in 2005 and first observed on June 23 that year.

== See also ==
- International Day of Remembrance and Tribute to the Victims of Terrorism
