= Buz-baz =

Buz-baz is a musical puppetry tradition found in northern Afghanistan. The puppet is a goat which is controlled by a string connected to the wrist of the puppeteer. The goat is completely carved out of wood and made out of sequins and baubles and sometimes bells. The goat stands for two things. One is markhor, which means snake-eating goat of Badakhshan, and the ancient belief that mountain goats had powers.

Along with the goat, there is traditional Afghan music that plays during the performance. The goat is in beat with the music because it is connected to an instrument called the dambura. This is possible because the goat is on a platform that has a string connected through a pipe to the instrument. So not only is the puppeteer in control of the goat but also plays the dambura at the same time.

== Sources ==
- JSTOR: Buz- Baz: A Musical Marionette of Northern Afghanistan by Mark Slobin
- Tea house music by Mark Slobin at http://afghanistan.wesleyan.edu
