= Hercules (1814 ship) =

History

United Kingdom
- Name: Hercules
- Builder: Gilmore & Co., Calcutta
- Launched: 27 December 1814
- Fate: Sold 1839

General characteristics
- Tons burthen: 400, or 402, or 416, or 424, or 424 1/32 (bm)
- Length: 104 ft 5 in (31.8 m)
- Beam: 20 ft 3 in (6.2 m)

Hercules was built at Calcutta in 1814. She acquired British registry and traded between Britain and India under a license from the British East India Company (EIC), before returning to Calcutta registry. She then traded opium between India and China, and became an opium receiving ship for Jardine Matheson. In 1839 she was one of the vessels that surrendered her store of opium to be burned at the behest of Chinese officials at Canton. This incident was one of the proximate causes of the First Opium War (1839–1842). Her owners apparently sold her to American owners in 1839.

== Career ==
Hercules cost 125,000 sicca rupees to build.

The British East India Company (EIC) in 1814 gave up its monopoly on trade between India and Britain. Hercules was one of the many vessels that then traded between the two under a license from the EIC.

Hercules appeared in 1816 in both Lloyd's Register (LR), and the Register of Shipping (RS). Lloyd's Register showed with C.H. Bean, master, Bonham, owner, and trade London–India. The Register of Shipping showed her with C. Bean, master, Grant, owner, and trade "In India". A list of "Licensed and Country Ships" showed that C.H. Bean sailed her on 20 April 1817 for Fort William, India. It also showed her husband as "Fair ies".

Although the registers continued to carry Hercules with stale data for some years, by 1819 she was registered at Calcutta with Henderson, master, and Fairlie and Co., owners. Various owners and masters followed. In 1829 her master was D. Wilson, and her owner J. Macintosh & Co. By 1832 her master and owner was D. Wilson, and she had a license to trade with China.

By 1833 Hercules belonged to Jardine Matheson and was operating as a receiving ship for opium at Lintin. In 1833 the Governor General of India canceled Hercule's's license as a receiving ship. For the cause of the revocation of the license see Correspondence....

In July 1833 the opium aboard Hercules consisted of (all dollar amounts are in Spanish dollars):

Type	Chests	Price per chest	Total
Patna (new)	786	$640	$503,040
Patna (old)	288	$759	$216,000
Benares (new)	50	$660	$33,000
Benares (old)	45	$710	$31,950
Malwa	470	$650	$305,500

In all, Hercules held 1639 chests of opium worth $1,089,490. (Note: Patna opium was known in China as kung pan t'ou (公班土, gongban tu), and Malwa as Pak t'ou (白土, bai tu)>) She also had 280,000 taels of sycee and gold, worth $391,000, 800 piculs of rice, worth $1,600, and 200 bales and boxes of piece goods, worth $36,000. The entire value of her cargo was $1,518,090.

In August Captain Grant and Hercules were involved in the Samarang affair. On 7 August 1833 Captain Grant, the marine superintendent for Jardine Matheson & Co., had Samarang pulled up on the beach at Tsinkeo Bay and broken up. Ten days later, a group of villagers from Keeow village arrived with pikes and other makeshift arms and took away some of the copper and iron salvaged from Samarang. In the subsequent melee, the British seized a local, but released him when he agreed to return to his village and retrieve the stolen materials. A few days after that, the villagers came again to raid the salvage. In the altercation that followed a seacunny disappeared, believed kidnapped by the villagers, or killed by them. Grant organized a force from Hercules and the other opium ships at anchor and attacked the village. Gunfire ensued as the villagers fired some cannon; the only major casualty was a villager, who was killed. Captain Grant, working on the basis of "A life for a life", was willing to let matters rest at that. However, an official inquiry resulted that took some time to smooth over the affair, with the assistance of a made up story and some bribes. For a slightly different account see Karsch.

In 1835 an advertisement in the local press stated that "Captain Parry of the Hercules has for sale at Lintin – chains, anchors, nails, cordage, copper sheathing, sheathing nails, canvas, boat guns."

Hercules was one of the opium ships belonging to Jardine Matheson that surrendered its opium for destruction at Humen. The destruction began on 3 June 1839 and involved the destruction of 1,000 long tons (1,016 t) of illegal opium seized from British traders under the aegis of Lin Zexu, an Imperial Commissioner of Qing China. Conducted on the banks of the Pearl River outside Humen Town, Dongguan, China, the action provided casus belli for Great Britain to declare war on Qing China in what is now known as the First Opium War, a conflict that initiated China's opening for trade with foreign nations under a series of treaties with the western powers.

== Fate ==
In 1839, with the Chinese blocking of opium imports, the opium receiving ships sailed, were sold, or broken up. Reportedly, Jardine Matheson sold Hercules to Americans.
