= International Day of Clean Air for Blue Skies =

International observance, 7 September

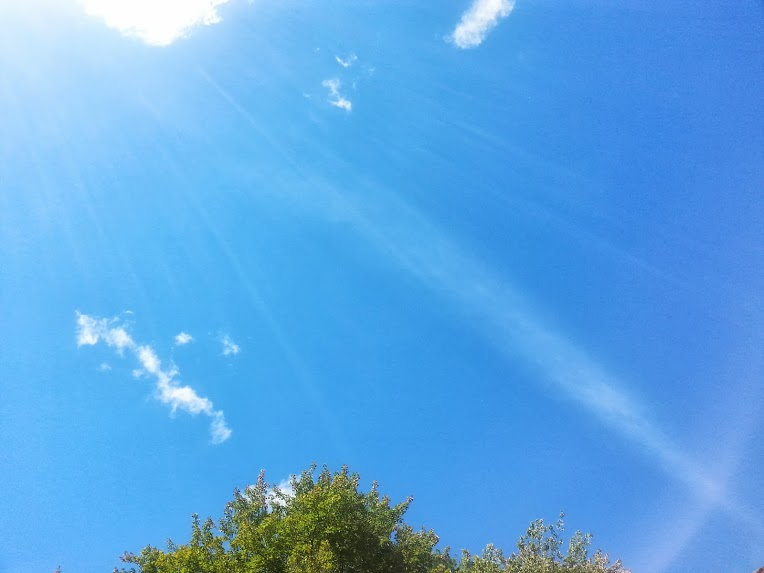
- Clear sky over Massachusetts by Jeannette Marianne E Lee
- Observed by: UN Members
- Date: 7 September
- Next time: 7 September 2026
- Frequency: Annual
- First time: 2020

The International Day of Clean Air for Blue Skies is designated by the United Nations General Assembly on 7 September to strengthen international cooperation in improving air quality and reducing air pollution. The designation was made through the Assembly resolution 74/212 and adopted on 19 December 2019.

The resolution was adopted without a vote, generally indicating all countries recognized the importance of the subject, were united on the issue, and no apparent divisions were present.

In that resolution, the General Assembly emphasized "the need to strengthen international cooperation at the global, regional and subregional levels in various areas related to improving air quality, including the collection and utilization of data, joint research and development, and the sharing of best practices." It specifically focuses on the disproportionate effect of poor air quality on women, children, and older persons.

The International Day raises awareness of clean air's importance to health, productivity, the economy, and the natural environment. Doing so demonstrates the connection between air quality and other environmental and developmental challenges, including climate change. This day is for sharing knowledge and practical actions used to improve air quality: practices, innovations, and success stories. This day brings together diverse actors working to advance air quality management.

The first observance of the International Day was held on 7 September 2020, with events held worldwide. However, owing to the COVID-19 pandemic, a majority of the commemorative events were held virtually. The lead coordinating partners of the International Day were the United Nations Environment Programme (UNEP) and the Climate and Clean Air Coalition to Reduce Short-Lived Climate Pollutants (CCAC), with additional funding from the Federal Ministry of the Environment, Nature Conservation and Nuclear Safety of Germany (BMU). In some of the commemorations, the World Health Organization partnered with the NGO BreatheLife to coordinate some activities for the day.

== See also ==
- Earth Day
- List of environmental dates
- List of international observances
