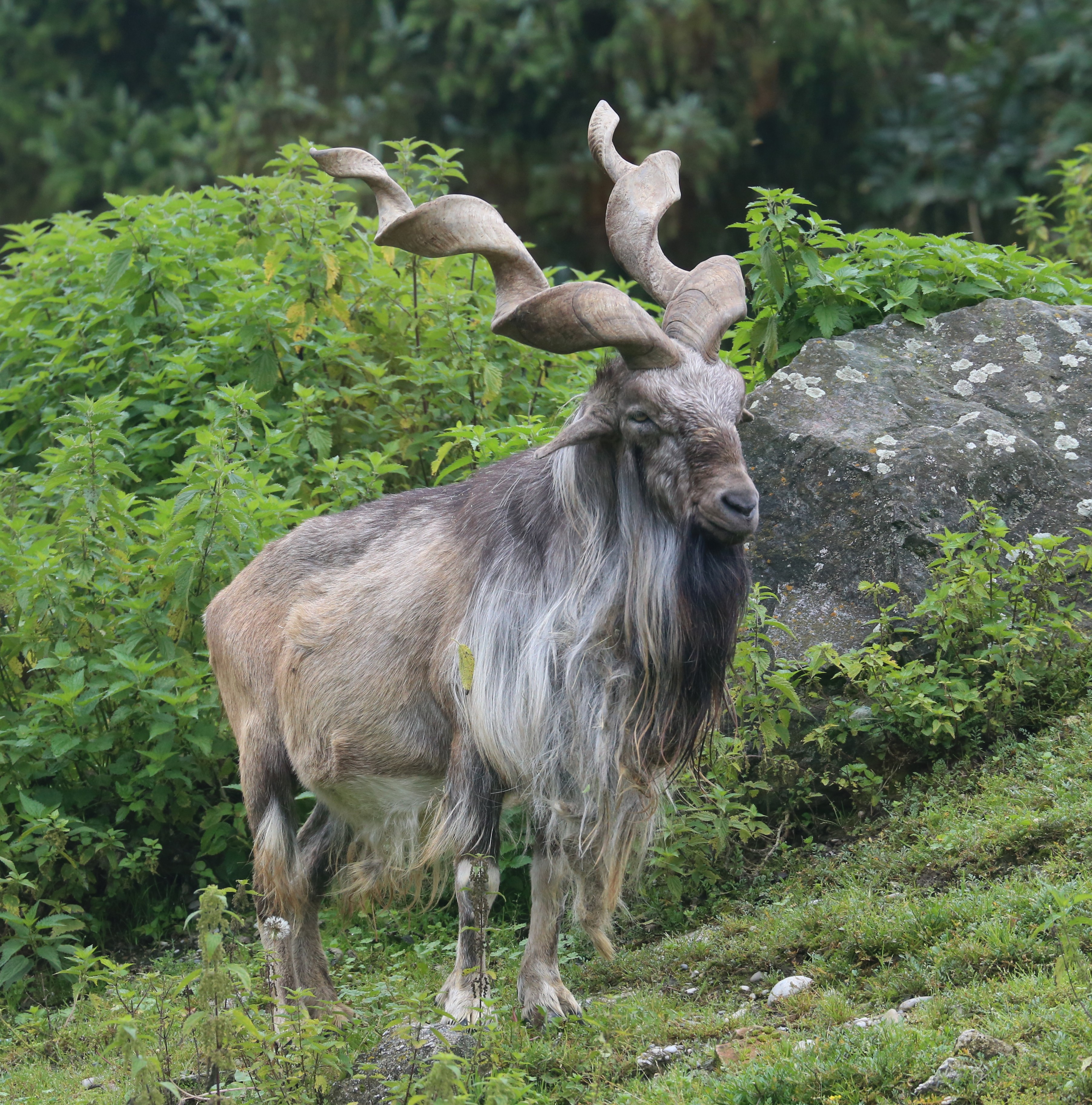
- Male markhor in captivity at the Augsburg Zoo in Bavaria, Germany

Conservation status
- Near Threatened (IUCN 3.1)
- CITES Appendix I

Scientific classification
- Kingdom: Animalia
- Phylum: Chordata
- Class: Mammalia
- Order: Artiodactyla
- Family: Bovidae
- Subfamily: Caprinae
- Genus: Capra
- Species: C. falconeri

Binomial name
- Capra falconeri (Wagner, 1839)

Subspecies
- See text
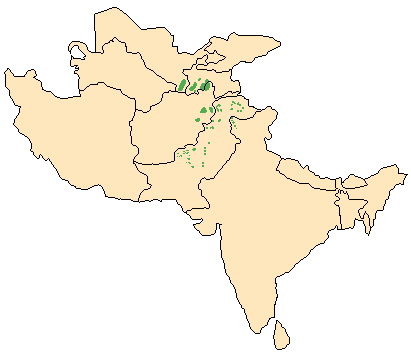
- Distribution of the markhor

= Markhor =

Species of mammal

The markhor (Capra falconeri) /ˈmɑːrkɔːr/ is a large wild Capra species native to the mountain regions at the crossroads of Central and South Asia, including the Karakoram and Himalayas. It occurs in parts of Turkmenistan, Uzbekistan, Tajikistan, Afghanistan, Pakistan, and India. It has been listed on the IUCN Red List as Near Threatened since 2015.

The markhor is the national animal of Pakistan, where it is also known as the screw-horn or screw-horned goat. The word "markhor" is derived from the Persian word markhar, meaning "curly" because of its curly horns. The word, which comes from both Pashto and mainly classical Persian languages, is combined from "mar" and "khor" and more literally means "snake eater", referencing the ancient belief that the markhor would actively kill and consume snakes.

== Description ==
Markhor adults stand 65 to 115 cm (26 to 45 in) at the shoulder, are 132 to 186 cm (52 to 73 in) long and weigh from 32 to 110 kg (71 to 243 lb). They have the highest maximum shoulder height among the species in the genus Capra, but is surpassed in length and weight by the Siberian ibex. The coat is of a grizzled, light brown to black colour, and is smooth and short in summer, while growing longer and thicker in winter. The fur of the lower legs is black and white. Markhor are sexually dimorphic, with males having longer hair on the chin, throat, chest, and shanks. Females are redder in colour, with shorter hair and a short, black beard, and are maneless. Both sexes have tightly curled, corkscrew-like horns, which close together at the head, but spread upwards toward the tips. The horns of males can grow up to 160 cm (63 in) long, and up to 25 cm (9.8 in) in females.

== Distribution and habitat ==
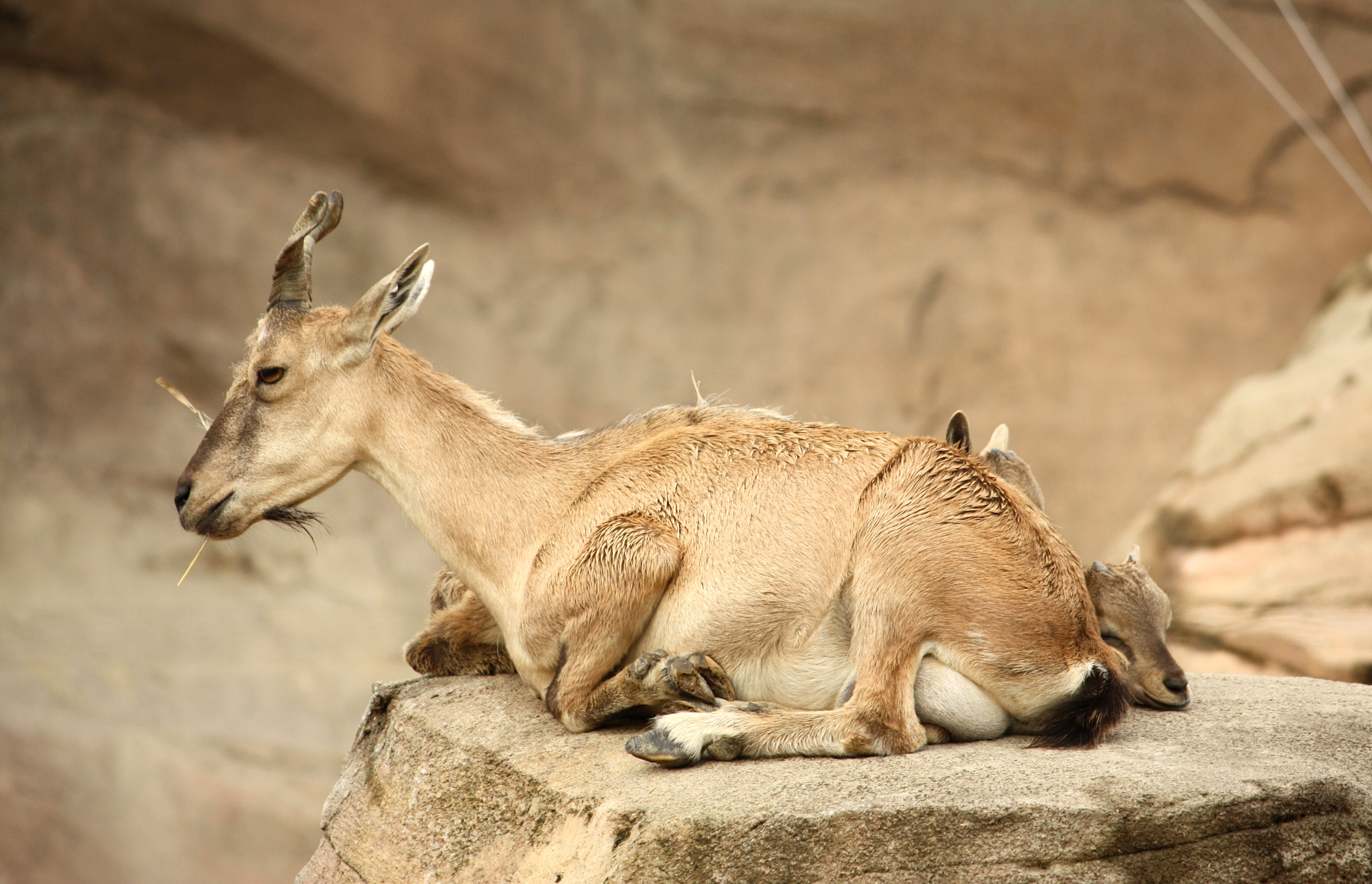
Female with young, at the Columbus Zoo and Aquarium

The markhor is adapted to mountainous terrain and lives at elevations of 600 to 3,600 m (2,000 to 11,800 ft). It inhabits shrub forests made up primarily of oaks (Quercus ilex), pines (Pinus gerardiana), and junipers (Juniperus macropoda).

In Central Asia, the Bukharan markhor formerly lived in most of the mountains stretching along the north banks of the Upper Amu Darya and the Panj Rivers from Turkmenistan to Tajikistan; two to three scattered populations now occur in a greatly reduced distribution. It is limited to the region between lower Pyanj and the Vakhsh Rivers near Kulyab in Tajikistan, and in the Kugitangtau Range in Uzbekistan and Turkmenistan.

In Afghanistan, the markhor is limited to the east in the high and mountainous monsoon forests of Laghman and Nuristan. Until 1978, it survived in the country only in the Kabul Gorge and the Kohe Safi area of Kapissa, and in some isolated pockets in between. It now lives the most inaccessible regions of its once wider range in the mountains of Kapissa and Kabul Provinces, after having been driven from its original habitat by intensive poaching.

In Pakistan, it is restricted to the Indus River and Kunar River and their tributaries; its present range consists of many small, isolated areas in Baluchistan, Khyber Pakhtunkhwa and Dera Ghazi Khan District. Along the Indus, it inhabits both banks from Jalkot in Kohistan District upstream to near the Tungas village in Baltistan, with Gakuch being its western limit up the Gilgit River, Chalt up the Hunza River, and the Parishing Valley up the Astore River. It occurs also around Chitral and the border areas with Afghanistan, where it inhabits a number of valleys along the Kunar River from Arandu on the west bank and Drosh on the east bank, up to Shoghor along the Lutkho River, and as far as Barenis along the Mastuj River. The largest population currently lives in Chitral National Park in Pakistan.

In India, the markhor is restricted to a portion of the Pir Panjal range in southwestern Jammu and Kashmir. Throughout this range, markhor populations are scattered, starting east of the Banihal Pass about 50 km (31 mi) from the Chenab River on the Jammu–Srinagar highway westward to the disputed border with Pakistan. It still occurs in catchments of the Limber and Lachipora Rivers in the Jhelum Valley Forest Division and around Shupiyan to the south of Srinagar.

== Behaviour and ecology ==
The markhor is diurnal and mainly active in the early morning and late afternoon. Its diets shift seasonally; in the spring and summer, it grazes, but turns to browsing in winter, sometimes standing on its hind legs to reach high branches. The mating season is during winter, when males fight each other by lunging, locking of horns, and attempting to push each other off balance. The gestation period lasts 135–170 days, and usually results in the birth of one or two kids, and occasionally three. Markhor live in herds, usually numbering nine animals, composed of adult females and their young. Adult males are largely solitary. Adult females and kids comprise most of the markhor population, with adult females making up 32% and kids making up 31%. Adult males comprise 19% of the population, while subadults (males aged 2–3 years) make up 12%, and yearlings (females aged 12–24 months) 9%. Their alarm call closely resembles the bleating of domestic goats. Early in the season, the males and females may be found together on the open, grassy patches and clear slopes among the forest. During the summer, the males remain in the forest, while the females generally climb to the highest rocky ridges above.

In the spring, the females stay closer to cliffs in areas with more rock coverage to provide protection for their offspring. The males stay in higher elevated areas with more access to vegetation for foraging so as to improve their body condition.

=== Predators ===
Eurasian lynx (Lynx lynx), snow leopard (Panthera uncia), Himalayan wolf (Canis lupus chanco), and brown bear (Ursus arctos) are the main predators of the markhor. The golden eagle (Aquila chrysaetos) has been reported to prey upon young markhor. The markhor possess keen eyesight and a strong sense of smell to detect nearby predators. Markhor are very aware of their surroundings and on high alert; in exposed areas, they are quick to spot and flee from predators.

== Taxonomy ==
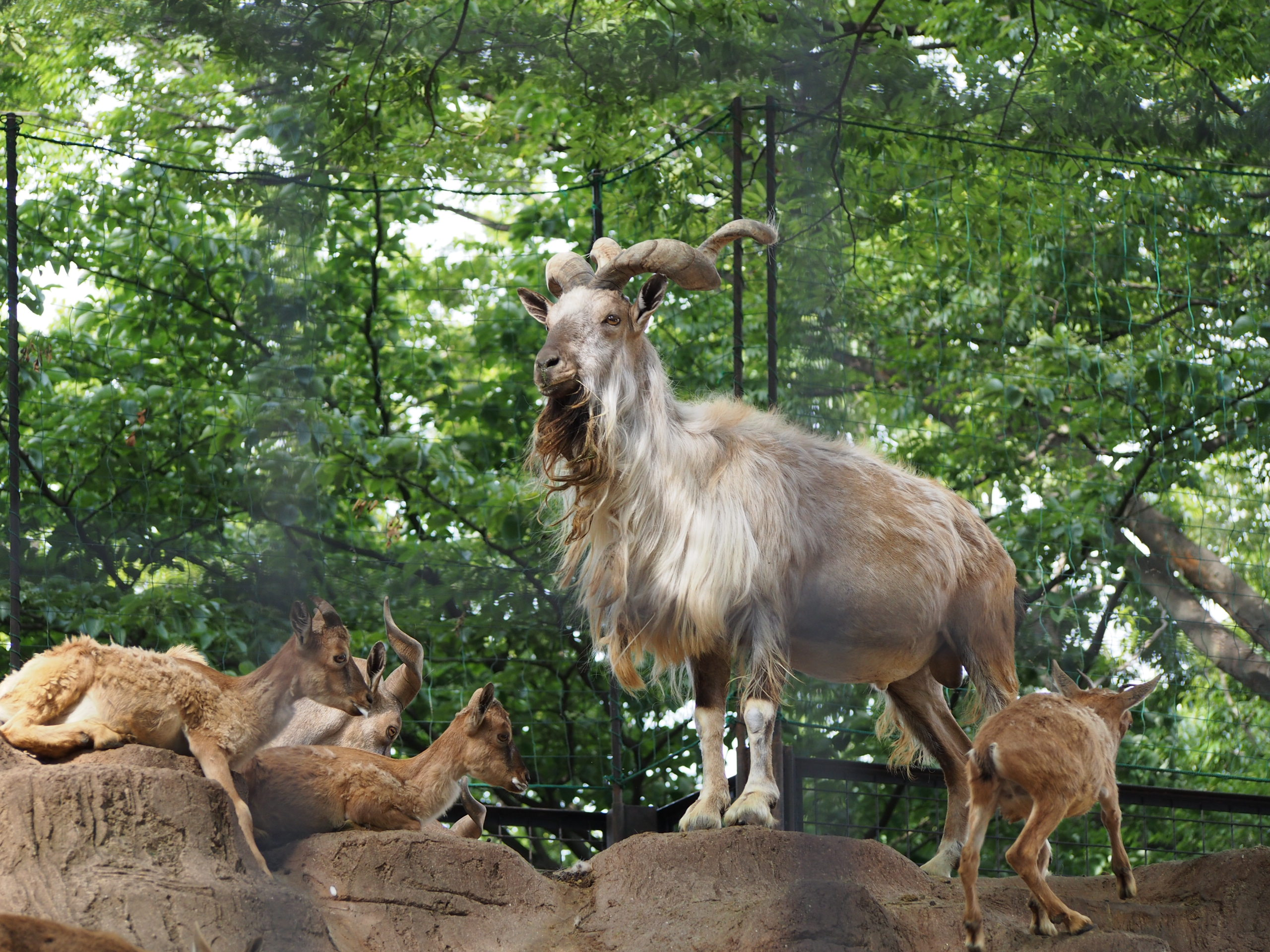
Captive markhor in a zoo in Kanagawa Prefecture, Japan

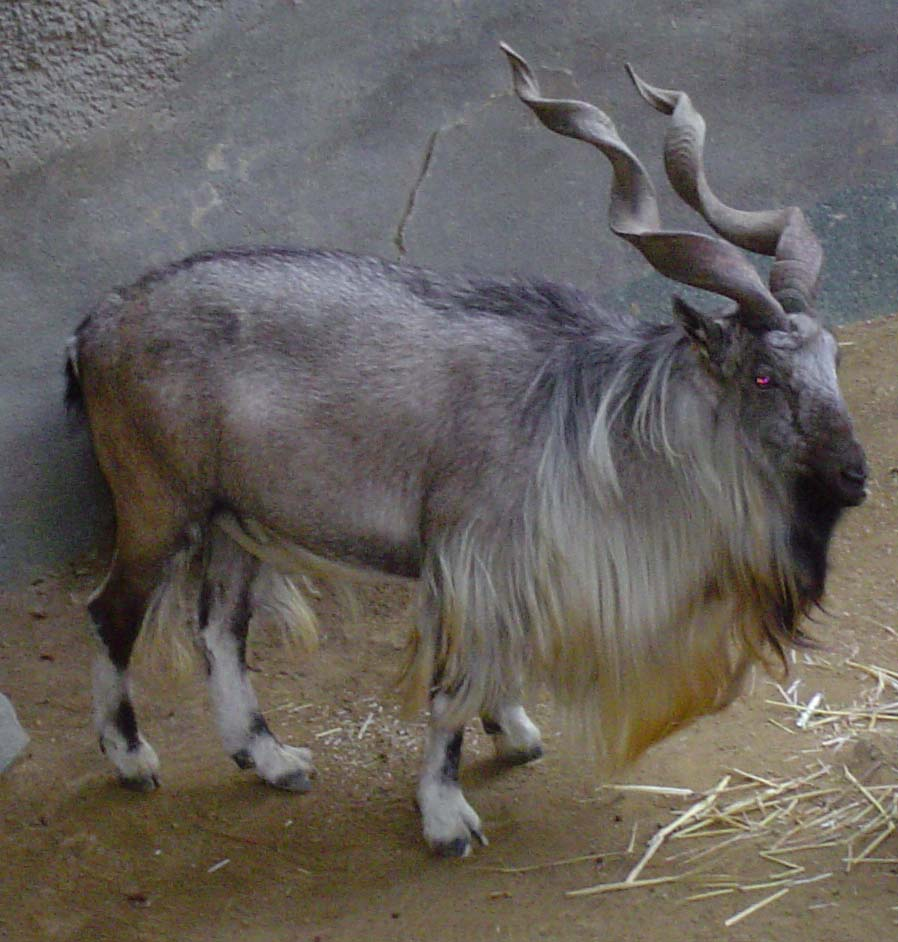
Captive Bukharan markhor in Los Angeles Zoo

Aegoceros (Capra) Falconeri was the scientific name proposed by Johann Andreas Wagner in 1839 based on a female specimen from the Indian Himalayas.

Three subspecies have been recognised as valid taxa:

- Astor markhor (C. f. falconeri, Wagner, 1839) has large, flat horns, branching widely and then going up nearly straight with only a half turn. It is considered synonymous with the Kashmir markhor Capra falconeri cashmiriensis.
- Kabul markhor (C. f. megaceros, Hutton, 1842) has horns with a slight corkscrew, as well as a twist. A junior synonym is C. f. jerdoni.
- Bukharan markhor (C. f. heptneri, Zalkin, 1945)

=== Relationship with the domestic goat ===
Some authors have postulated that the markhor is the ancestor of some breeds of the domestic goat. The Angora goat has been regarded by some as a direct descendant of the Central Asian markhor. Evidence for markhors crossbreeding with domestic goats has been found. One study suggested that 35.7% of captive markhors in the analysis from three different zoos had mitochondrial DNA from domestic goats. Other authors have suggested that markhor may have been the ancestor of some Egyptian goat breeds, based on their similar horns, though the lack of an anterior keel on the horns of the markhor belies any close relationship. The Changthangi domestic goat of Ladakh and Tibet may derive from the markhor. The Girgentana goat of Sicily is thought to have been bred from markhor, as is the Bilberry goat of Ireland. The Kashmiri feral herd of about 200 individuals on the Great Orme limestone headland of Wales are derived from a herd maintained at Windsor Great Park belonging to Queen Victoria.

Fecal samples taken from markhor and domestic goats indicate that a serious level of competition exists for food between the two species. The competition for food between herbivores is believed to have significantly reduced the standing crop of forage in the Himalaya–Karkoram–Hindukush ranges. Domestic livestock have an advantage over wild herbivores, since the density of their herds often pushes their competitors out of the best grazing areas, and decreased forage availability has a negative effect on female fertility.

Genetic studies suggest that the markhor diverged early from other Capra species, making it one of the most evolutionary distinct wild goats. Capra falconeri forms a well-supported clade, meaning it is genetically distinct and monophyletic descended from a common ancestor not shared with other species in the genus.

== Threats ==
Hunting for meat as a means of subsistence or trade in wildlife parts adds to the growing problem for wildlife managers in many countries. Poaching, with its indirect impacts as disturbance, increasing fleeing distances and resulting reduction of effective habitat size, is by far the most important factor threatening the survival of the markhor populations. The most important types of poachers seem to be local inhabitants, state border guards, the latter usually relying on local hunting guides, and Afghans, illegally crossing the border. Poaching causes fragmentation of the population into small islands, where the remaining subpopulations are prone to extinction. The markhor is a valued trophy hunting prize for its spiral horns. The Pakistani government issued several tags in an attempt to save the species, which since the introduction of hunting, the species has seen a remarkable rebound. The continuing declines of markhor populations finally caught the attention of the international community.

=== Hunting ===
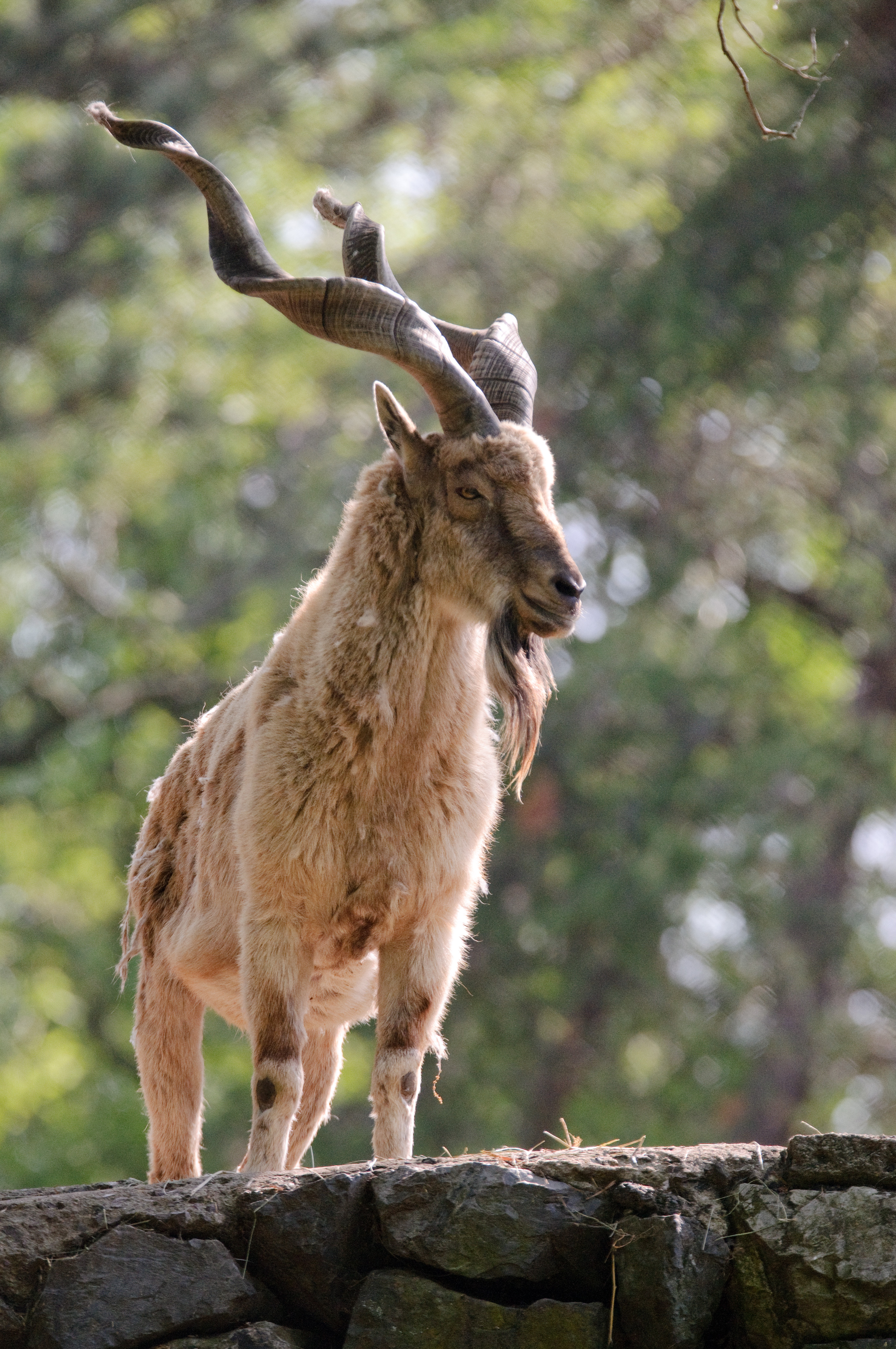
Markhor

In British India, the markhor was considered to be among the most challenging game species, because of the danger involved in stalking and pursuing it in mountainous terrain. According to Arthur Brinckman in his The Rifle in Cashmere, "a man who is a good walker will never wish for any finer sport than ibex or markhoor shooting". Elliott Roosevelt I wrote of how he shot two markhor in 1881, his first on 8 July, his second on 1 August.

Although hunting markhor in Afghanistan is illegal, it has been traditionally hunted in Nuristan and Laghman Provinces, and this may have intensified during the War in Afghanistan. In Pakistan, hunting markhor is legal as part of a conservation process; expensive hunting licenses are available from the Pakistani government that allow the hunting of old markhors, which are no longer good for breeding purposes. In India, hunting markhor is illegal, but it is poached for food and for its horns, which are thought to have medicinal properties.

The markhor is listed as near threatened on the IUCN Red List; as of 2013, the population was estimated at 5,800 individuals that was projected to be stable in view of ongoing conservation efforts.

== Conservation ==
In India, the markhor is a fully protected Schedule I species under the Jammu and Kashmir's Wildlife (Protection) Act of 1978. In 1973, two reserves were established in Tajikistan: Dashtijum Strict Reserve with 20,000 ha (49,000 acres) and Dashtijum Reserve with 53,000 ha (130,000 acres). Though these reserves exist to protect and conserve the markhor population, the regulations are poorly enforced, making poaching common, as is habitat destruction. Although markhors still face ongoing threats, recent studies have shown considerable success regarding the conservation approach that began in the 1900s, when a local hunter was persuaded by a hunting tourist to stop poaching markhors. The local hunter established a conservancy that inspired two other local organizations called Morkhur and Muhofiz. These organizations expect that their efforts will not only protect the markhor but also allow for the sustainable exploitation of the species. This approach has proven to be more effective than the protection of lands that lack enforcement and security.

On 2 May 2024, the United Nations General Assembly declared 24 May as the International Day of Markhor, recognizing the importance of conservation of the species.

== In culture ==
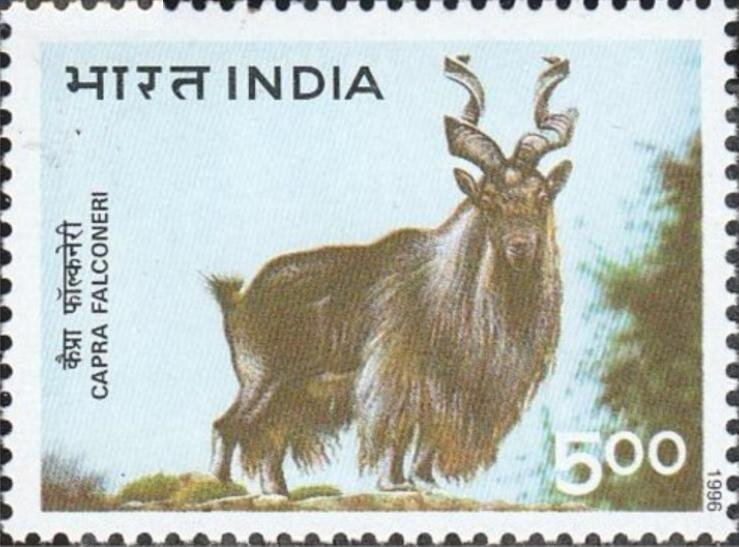
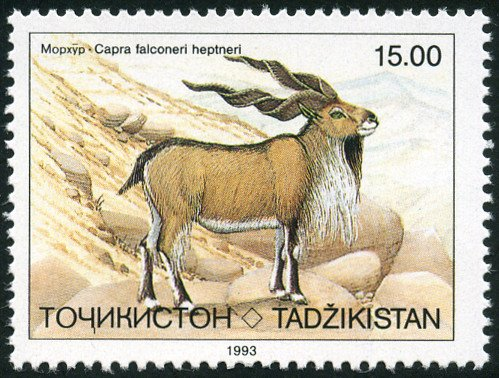
Markhor on postal stamps of India (left) and Tajikistan (right)

The markhor is the national animal of Pakistan. It was one of the 72 animals featured on the World Wide Fund for Nature Conservation Coin Collection in 1976. Markhor marionettes are used in the Afghan puppet shows known as buz-baz. The markhor features in the Pakistani animated film Allahyar and the Legend of Markhor.

=== Etymology ===
The name is thought to be derived from Persian language — a conjunction of mâr (مار, "snake, serpent") and the suffix khor (خور, "-eater"), interpreted to represent the animal's alleged ability to kill snakes, or as a reference to its corkscrew-like horns, which are somewhat reminiscent of coiling snakes.

In folklore, the markhor is believed to kill and eat serpents. Thereafter, while chewing the cud, a foam-like substance comes out of its mouth that drops on the ground and dries. This foam-like substance is sought after by the local people, who believe it is useful in extracting the poison from snakebites.
