= World Day for Safety and Health at Work =

UN international day

- Type: International
- Significance: work environment, occupational safety and health
- Date: April 28 (annually)
- Related to: International Workers' Day, Labour Day, Labor Day

World Day for Safety and Health at Work is a UN international day that is celebrated every April 28. It is concerned about safe work and awareness of the dimensions and consequences of work-related accidents and diseases; to place occupational safety and health (OSH) on the international and national agendas; and to provide support to the national efforts for the improvement of national OSH systems and programmes in line with relevant international labor standards. It coincides with Workers' Memorial Day and the Canadian National Day of Mourning.

World Day for Safety and Health at Work was first celebrated by the International Labour Organization in 2003.
