= World Seagrass Day =

Annual day promoting seagrass conservation

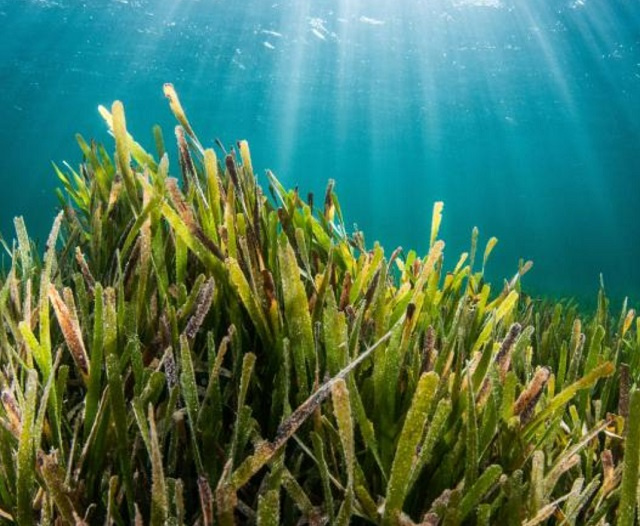
Seagrass meadow in Seychelles

World Seagrass Day is an annual event held on March 1 to raise awareness about seagrass and its important functions in the marine ecosystem.

== Background ==
On 27 May 2022, United Nations General Assembly adopted a resolution on World Seagrass Day in document A/76/L.56) on the fact that seagrass ecosystems have a greater capacity to sequester carbon than terrestrial ecosystems. The resolution invited Member States, organizations and agencies of the United Nations, non-governmental organizations, academic institutions, private sector, to observe World Seagrass Day, in order to contribute to sustainable development and climate change mitigation and adaptation.
