= International Day of Charity =

International observance, 5 September

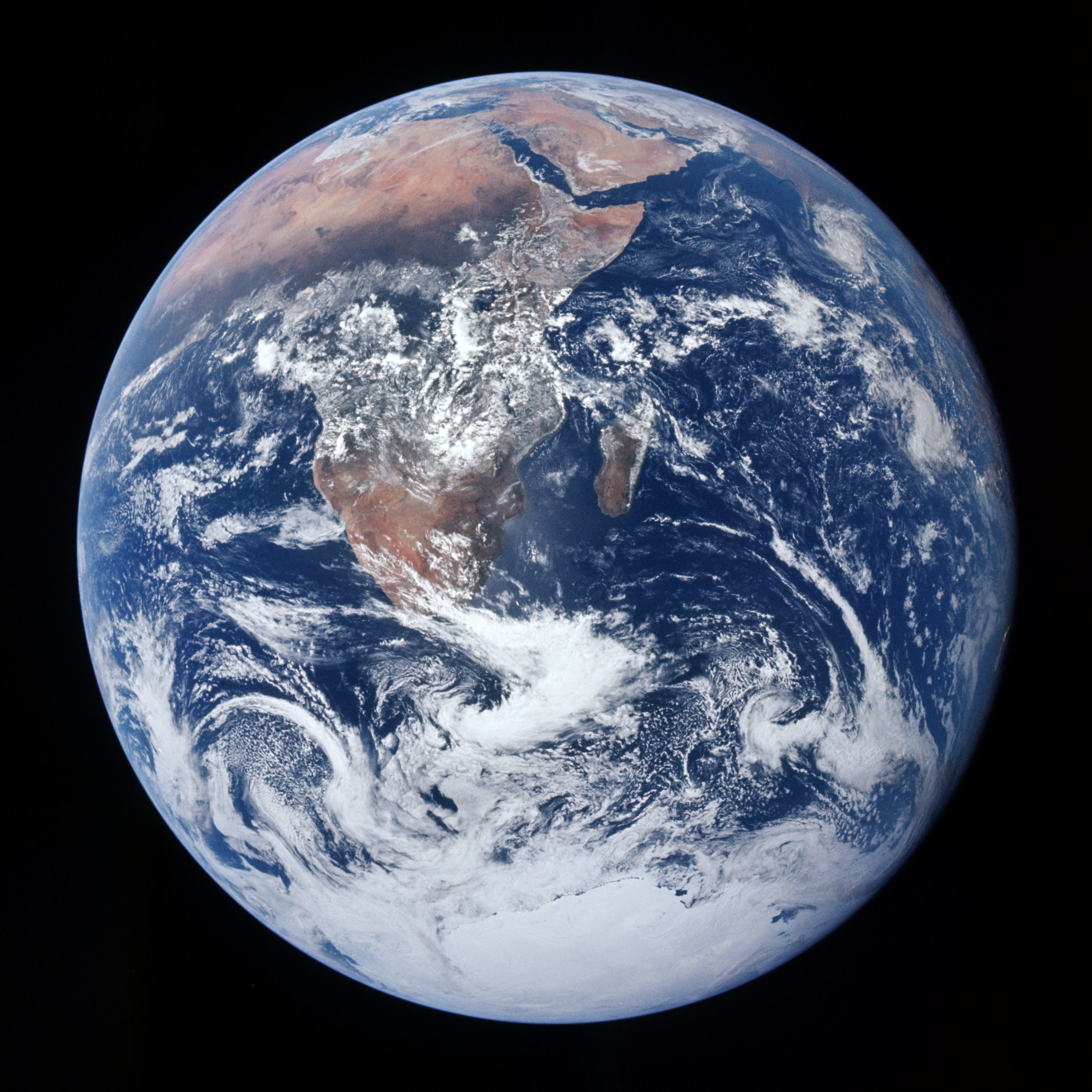
- Also called: IDC
- Observed by: UN Members
- Date: 5 September
- Next time: 5 September 2026
- Frequency: annual

The International Day of Charity is an international day observed annually on 5 September. It was declared by the United Nations General Assembly in 2012. The prime purpose of the International Day of Charity is to raise awareness and provide a common platform for charity related activities all over the world for individuals, charitable, philanthropic and volunteer organizations for their own purposes on the local, national, regional and international level.

== History ==
The International Day of Charity was conceived as a Hungarian civil society initiative supported by the Hungarian Parliament and Government in 2011, to enhance visibility, organize special events, and in this way to increase solidarity, social responsibility and public support for charity.

September 5 was chosen in order to commemorate the anniversary of the death of Mother Teresa of Calcutta, who received the Nobel Peace Prize in 1979 "for work undertaken in the struggle to overcome poverty and distress, which also constitute a threat to peace."

On 17 December 2012, in response to a proposal by Hungary, the United Nations General Assembly adopted a resolution by consensus to designate 5 September as the International Day of Charity. The resolution was co-sponsored by 44 UN Member States (Albania, Angola, Australia, Belarus, Bosnia and Herzegovina, Bulgaria, Cambodia, Chile, Croatia, Dominican Republic, Eritrea, Estonia, Georgia, Greece, Guatemala, Honduras, Hungary, India, Ireland, Israel, Italy, Jordan, Kazakhstan, Kyrgyzstan, Latvia, Lebanon, Lithuania, Luxembourg, Macedonia, Madagascar, Malta, Montenegro, Pakistan, Poland, Republic of Cyprus, Republic of Korea, Romania, Serbia, Singapore, Slovakia, Slovenia, Thailand, Turkey, Ukraine) representing all five Regional Groups of the United Nations.

In its resolution, the General Assembly invited Member States, organizations of the United Nations system and other international and regional organizations, stakeholders, as well as NGOs of the civil society, to commemorate the International Day of Charity in an appropriate manner, by encouraging charity, including through education and public awareness-raising activities.

=== First commemoration by the United Nations ===
On 5 September 2013, the Permanent Mission of Hungary to the United Nations, in cooperation with the United Nations Development Programme, the United Nations Foundation and with the support of the United Nations Department of Information, marked the first commemoration of the International Day of Charity at the United Nations Headquarters in New York. The commemoration started with keynote speeches by Assistant Secretary-General Robert C. Orr, Kathy Calvin, President and CEO of the UN Foundation and Hugh Evans, CEO of the Global Poverty Project. Two panel discussions moderated by Matthew Bishop from The Economist and Ruma Bose, author of Mother Teresa CEO, explored the role of charity in poverty alleviation and in promoting access to clean water and sanitation. Speakers represented leading organizations in the field of philanthropy, including charity: water, WaterAid, The Resource Alliance, the Foundation Center and The Coca-Cola Foundation. Discussions focused on lessons learned and the role of the non-profit sector in the implementation of the Post-2015 Development Agenda. The Secretary-General sent a written message on the occasion of the International Day of Charity.

=== Other events around the world on 5 September 2013 ===
In the capital of Hungary the Apostolic Nunciature and the Embassy of the Republic of Albania organised a special event including a mass, a photo exhibition and a donation on the occasion of the first International Day of Charity. Qatar Red Crescent and The Ritz-Carlton Doha celebrated the International Day of Charity and dedicated to Syrian children under the slogan "Bringing Back Their Joy”. Devotees and volunteers of the Hungarian Society for Krishna Consciousness held a special free food distribution program in the heart of Hungary’s capital Budapest, serving 500 plates of hot delicious vegetarian meal, yoghurt, fruits and sweets hourly. The Holy See issued a press release on the International Day of Charity.

== International Day of Charity in 2014 ==
In 2014, International Day of Charity events and fund raisers took place around the world, ranging from restaurants donating profits from sales of the day, to Ice Bucket Challenge events, to blanket distributions. A Mother Teresa statue was unveiled in Budapest (a donation from Ambassador of Republic of Albania H. E Mira Hoxha and Municipality of Budapest). A charity concert organized by Albanian Embassy in Budapest and the Municipality of Budapest, in MOM Cultural Centre for the International Day of Charity.

== See also ==
- International Day of Peace
