= International Day of the Markhor =

Annual observance dedicated to markhors

World Markhor Day
- Observed by: United Nations Member States
- Type: International
- Date: 24 May

The International Day of the Markhor is a global observance proclaimed by the United Nations General Assembly, held annually on 24 May. The observance recognises the importance of conservation of the markhor, a species of wild mountain goat, and its natural habitat.

== Background and origin ==
The International Day of the Markhor was established by the United Nations General Assembly on 2 May 2024. The resolution was sponsored by Pakistan and eight other countries. The markhor, indigenous to the highlands of Central and South Asia, is a species of significant ecological value, but faces challenges such as loss of habitat, repeated instances of poaching and the impacts of climate change. In 2014, the markhor was categorised as near threatened and it is currently listed on the Red List of Threatened Species by the International Union for Conservation of Nature.
