= United Nations Day for South-South Cooperation =

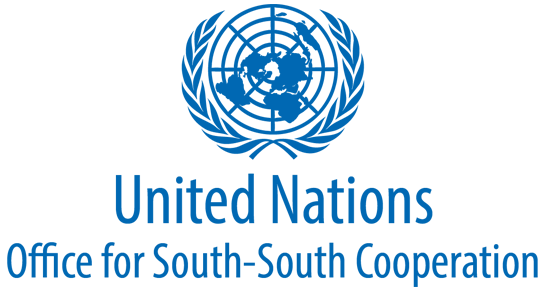
- Observed by: United Nation Member States
- Type: United Nations observance
- Significance: Celebrates South-South cooperation among developing countries
- Date: 12 September
- Frequency: Annual
- Related to: Sustainable Development Goals

The United Nations Day for South-South Cooperation is an annual observance established by the United Nations General Assembly to promote and celebrate cooperation among developing countries.

== History ==
This was first declared in 2003 by the United Nations General Assembly in United Nations General Assembly Resolution on 19 December as the United Nations Day for South-South Cooperation and in 2011 the date was moved to 12 September to commemorate the adoption of the Buenos Aires Plan of Action for Promoting and Implementing Technical Cooperation among Developing Countries in 1978. This plan laid the foundation for South-South cooperation by encouraging developing countries to share knowledge, expertise, and resources to address common challenges.

== See also ==
- South–South cooperation: Collaborative efforts among developing countries
- Sustainable Development Goals
