= International Day of Remembrance and Tribute to the Victims of Terrorism =

Day of remembrance established by the United Nations

The International Day of Remembrance and Tribute to the Victims of Terrorism was established by the United Nations (UN) General Assembly in 2017. It designated 21 August as a day to honour the victims and survivors of terrorism. A statement by the UN said the day was established "in order to honour and support the victims and survivors of terrorism and to promote and protect the full enjoyment of their human rights and fundamental freedoms".

== See also ==
- National Day of Remembrance for Victims of Terrorism (Canada)
