= International Girls in ICT Day =

UN world day

The International Girls in ICT Day is celebrated on the fourth Thursday in April to create awareness on the need for more girls and women in the information and communications technology (ICT) sector.

== Background ==
The day is an initiative of the Plenipotentiary Resolution 70 (Rev. Busan, 2014) by the Member States of the International Telecommunication Union to create programs that encourage girls and young women to consider studies and careers in information and communication technologies.

In 2022, the African Development Bank's Coding for Employment program set aside half its training slots for women applicants to commemorate International Girls in ICT Day.

== Participation ==
In 2015, annual Girls in ICT Day events recorded about 177,000 girls around the world through over 5,300 events in more than 150 countries. By 2022, International Telecommunication Union data showed that more than 3,62,000 girls and young women have celebrated more than 11,000 celebrations in 171 countries worldwide during the International Girls in ICT Day.

== See also ==
- International Day of the Girl Child
