= International Day Against Drug Abuse and Illicit Trafficking =

United Nations international observance

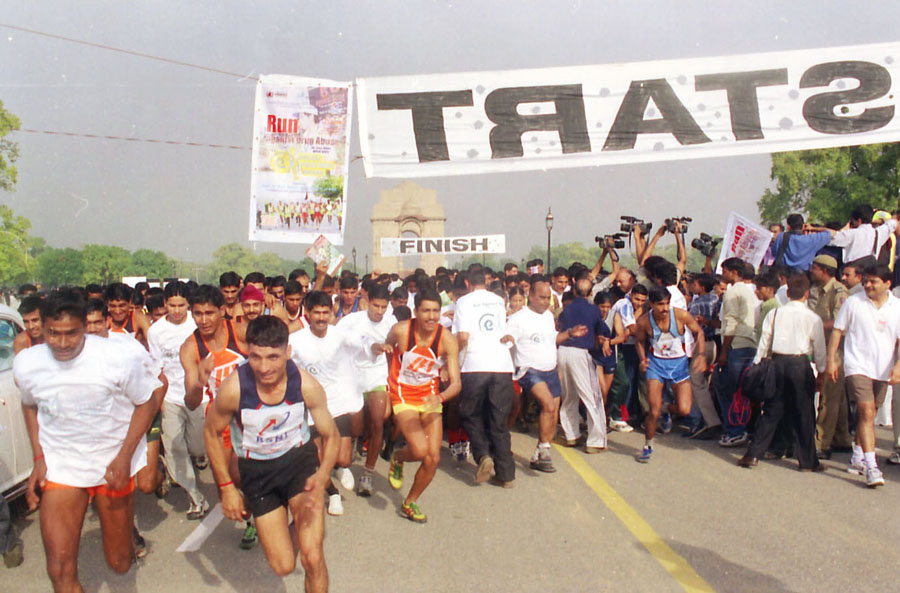
2000 young people participating in the 'Run Against Drugs', organized to mark the International Day Against Drug Abuse and Illicit Trafficking in New Delhi, India on 26 June 2004

The International Day Against Drug Abuse and Illicit Trafficking is a United Nations International Day against drug abuse and the illegal drug trade. It is observed annually since 26 June 1989. The date 26 June is to commemorate Lin Zexu's dismantling of the opium trade in Humen, Guangdong, ending on 25 June 1839, just before the First Opium War in China. The observance was instituted by UN General Assembly Resolution 42/112 of 7 December 1987.

On 26 June 1987, two important texts (Comprehensive Multidisciplinary Outline of Future Activities in Drug Abuse Control & Declaration of the International Conference on Drug Abuse and Illicit Trafficking) were adopted at the International Conference on Drug Abuse and Illicit Trafficking, which was held in Vienna during 17–26 June 1987. The Conference recommended that an annual day should be observed to mark the importance of the fight against drug abuse and illicit trafficking. Both the dates 17 June and 26 June were suggested, and in the later meetings 26 June was chosen and written into the draft and final resolution. It is often referred to by anti-drug campaigners as 6/26, a play on the "4/20" day that celebrates marijuana.

The UN's 2007 World Drug Report puts the value of the illegal drug trade at US$322 billion a year.

Campaigns, rallies, poster designing and many other programs are conducted. People of different countries celebrate the day together.

‘Health for Justice. Justice for Health’, the theme for International Day against Drug Abuse and Illicit Trafficking 2019, highlights that “justice and health are two sides of the same coin when it comes to addressing drug problems.”

== "Support. Don't punish." campaign ==
Since 2013, a campaign called "Support. Don't punish" has been associated with the 26 June. Coordinated by the International Drug Policy Consortium, it demands that approaches to drug policy be focused on health, human rights, and the end of the criminalization of people who use drugs.
