= World Pulses Day =

International day recognizing legumes

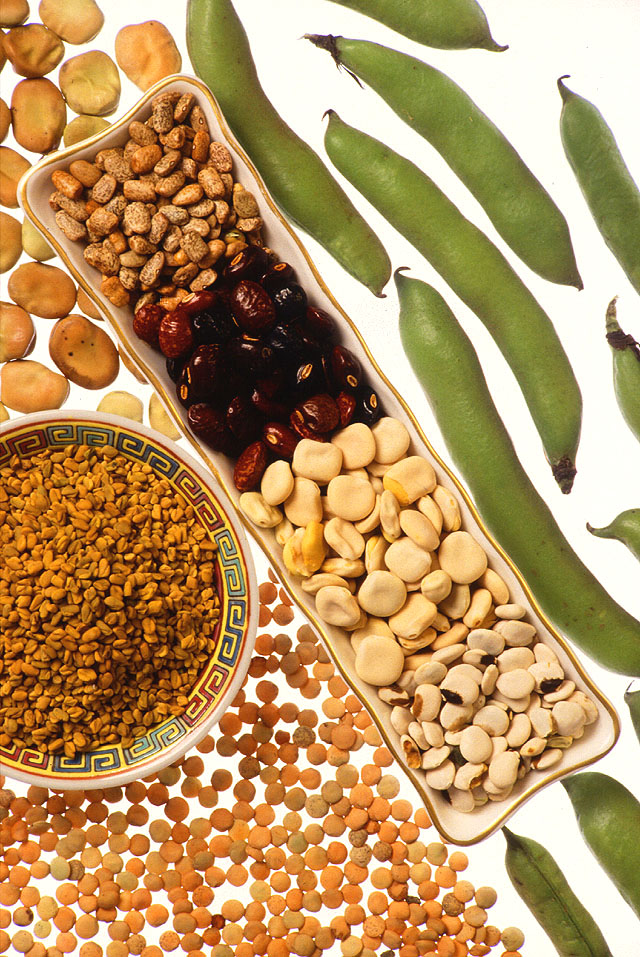
- A selection of various legumes.
- Observed by: United Nations
- Date: February 10
- Duration: One day
- Frequency: Annual

World Pulses Day is an international day established by the Food and Agriculture Organization (FAO) of the United Nations to recognize the importance of pulses (dry beans, lentils, dry peas, chickpeas, lupins) as a global food.

== Establishment and purpose ==
It was designated to fall on February 10 each year since 2019 by the seventy-third session of the United Nations General Assembly on December 20, 2018. The date aims to bring attention to activities and information connected to the pulse sector worldwide.

World Pulses Day provides an opportunity to raise awareness about the nutritional benefits of pulses as part of sustainable food production aimed towards food security and nutrition.

The official designation is also linked to the United Nations' 2030 Agenda for Sustainable Development, a comprehensive set of universal and transformative Sustainable Development Goals that seek to strengthen universal peace.

World Pulses Day also seeks to maintain momentum gained during FAO's announcement of 2016 as the International Year of Pulses.
