= International Day of Awareness of Food Loss and Waste =

Annual observance to raise awareness of food loss and waste

- Type: United Nations International Declaration
- Celebrations: World wide events
- Date: 29 September
- Next time: 29 September 2025
- Frequency: Annual
- Related to: Food loss and waste

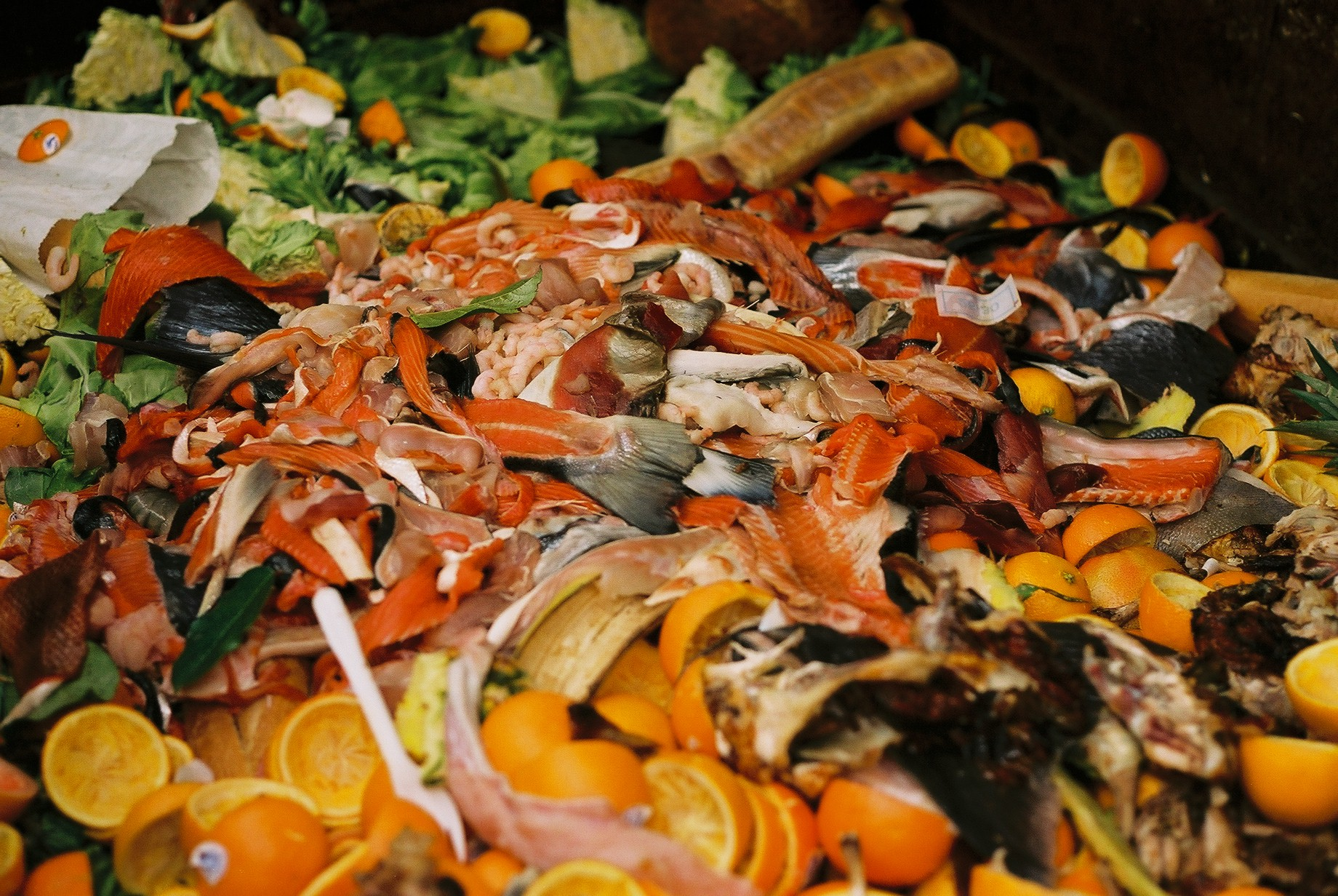

International Day of Awareness of Food Loss and Waste is a United Nations-sanctioned designated awareness day observed annually on 29 September with the goal to raise awareness of the importance of food loss and waste. This day is co-convened by the Food and Agriculture Organization (FAO) and the United Nations Environment Programme (UNEP), whereas, the day's events are jointly led by these two organizations.

The main aim of the day is to raise awareness to the importance of food loss and waste related problems and their possible solutions at all levels, and also to promote global efforts and collective action towards meeting the Sustainable Development Goal Target 12.3, which targets to halve per capita food waste at the retail and consumer level by 2030, and reduce food losses along the food production and supply chains. It has been calculated that an average of 74 kg of food per person is wasted each year worldwide. According to some estimates, 1.4 billion hectares of agricultural land are used annually to produce food that will eventually be discarded; 14% of produced food (worth approximately 400 billion dollars) is lost between harvest and sale, while 17% of global agrifood production is wasted. In addition, food loss and waste related problems contribute to the emission of greenhouse gases leading environmental detriment as well. This day was first observed on 29 September 2020.
