= World Creativity and Innovation Day =

Annual UN day celebrated on 21 April

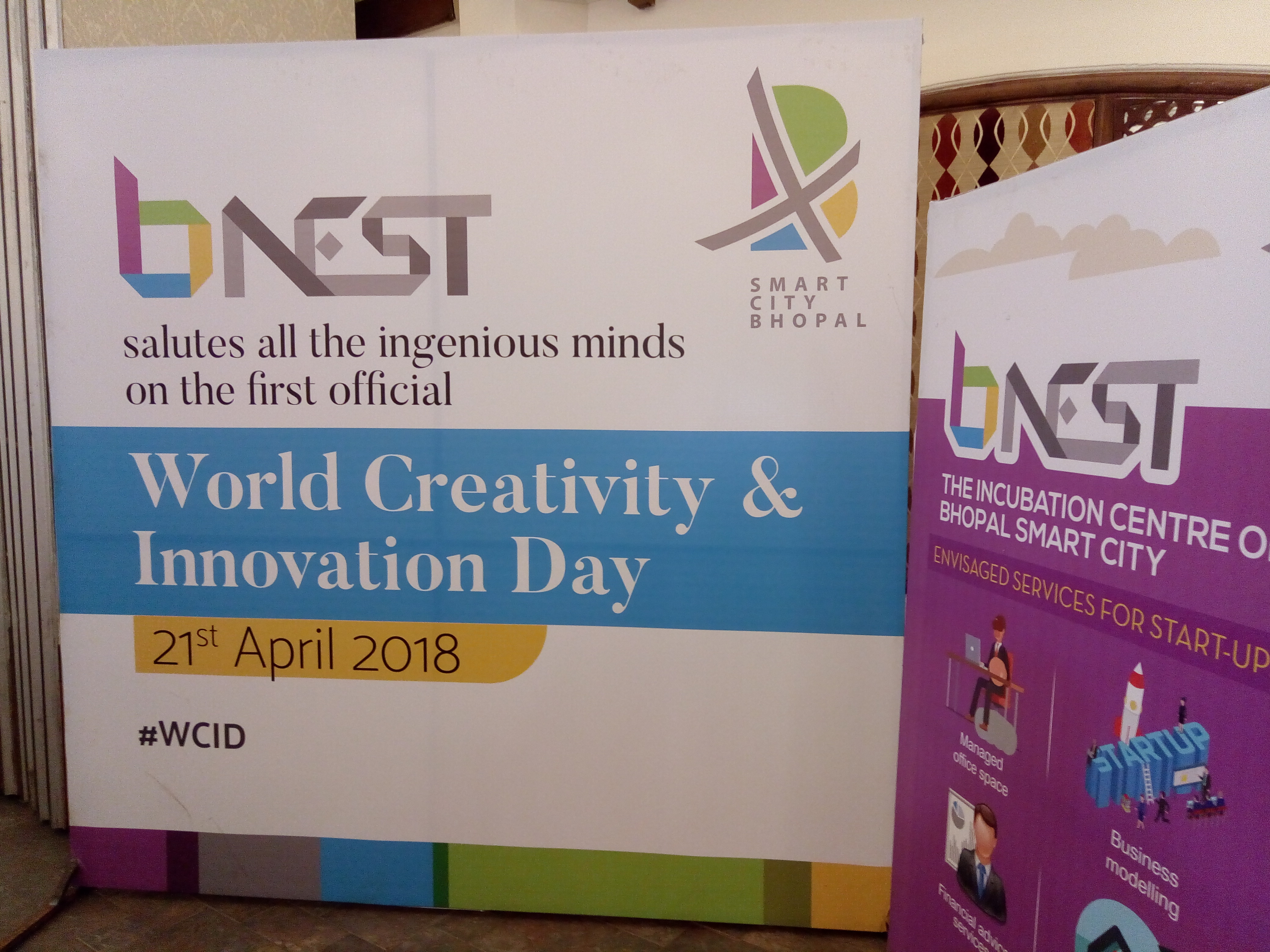
World Creativity and Innovation Day being celebrated in Bhopal, India, on 21 April 2018

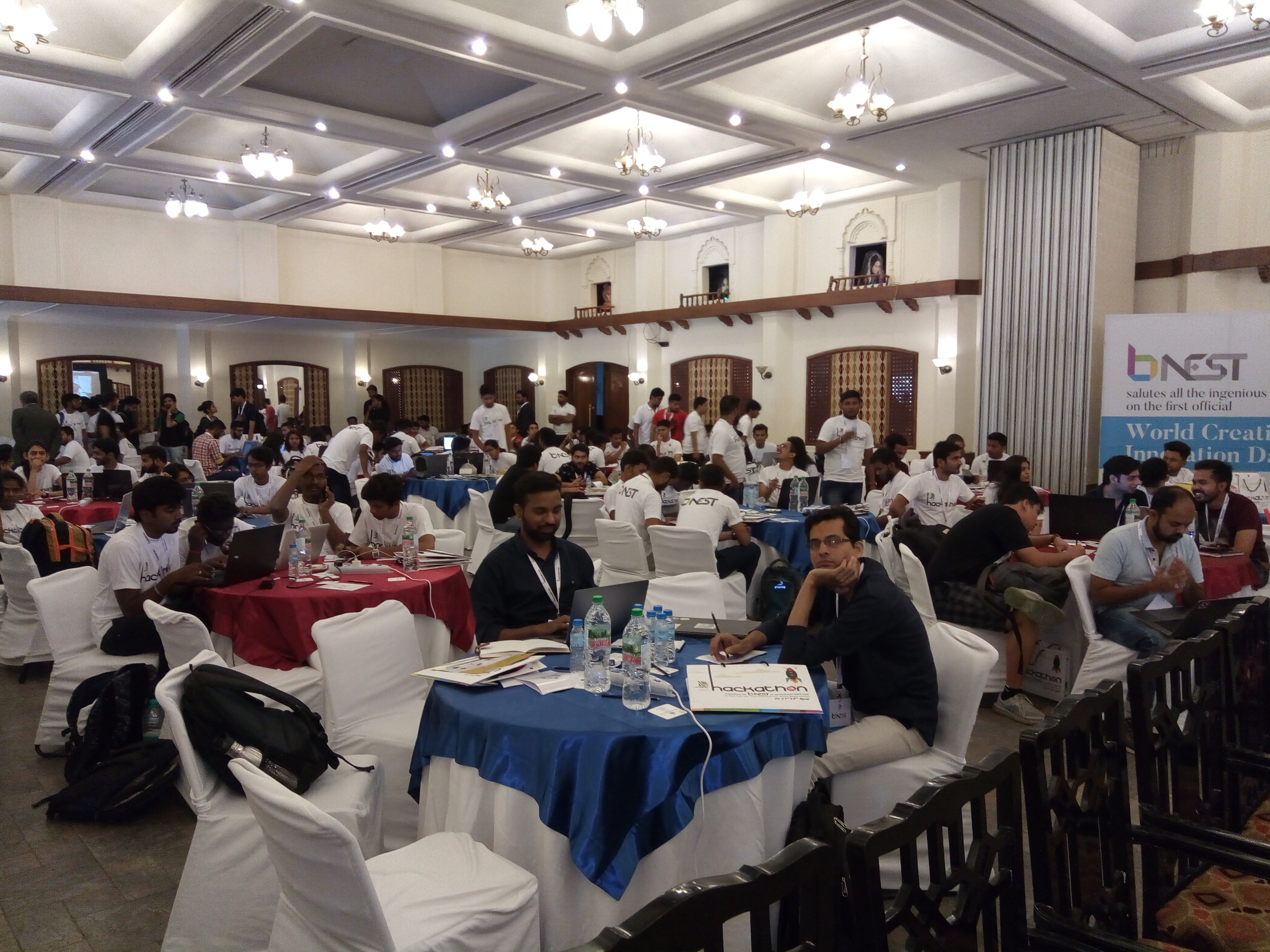
Participants of the Bhopal Smart City Hackathon on World Creativity and Innovation Day in 2018

World Creativity and Innovation Day (#WCID) is a global UN day celebrated on April 21 to raise awareness around the importance of creativity and innovation in problem solving with respect to advancing the United Nations sustainable development goals, also known as the "global goals".

The first World Creativity and Innovation Day was celebrated on 21 April 2002. Subsequently, on 27 April 2017, the United Nations General Assembly passed UN resolution 71/284 with the support of 80 countries to formally designate 21 April as World Creativity and Innovation Day. It was then officially celebrated for the first time on 21 April 2018.

The purpose of the day is to encourage creative multidisciplinary thinking at the individual and group levels which, according to a special report on the creative economy by UNESCO, UNDP, and UNOSSC, has "become the true wealth of nations in the 21st century."
