= List of environmental dates =

This is a list of environmental dates which are designated for creating awareness of environmental issues.

Species awareness days highlight biodiversity, with the aim of increasing understanding and appreciation of the subject. Some of these days have been shown to cause a rise in information-seeking behaviour, and may lead to an increase in conservation fundraising by charities and advocacy groups.

== Hours ==
- Earth Hour – 8:30 pm (local time), next one will take place on 28 March 2026.

== Days of environment ==
Environmental Date	Date(s)
National Bird Day	January 5
International Zebra Day	January 31
World Wetlands Day	February 2
World Ostrich Day	February 2
World Marmot Day	February 2
World Pangolin Day	Third Saturday of February
World Whale Day	Third Sunday of February
World Bonobo Day	February 14
World Hippopotamus Day	February 15
International Polar Bear Day	February 27
World Wildlife Day	March 3
International Day of Action for Rivers	March 14
World Consumer Rights Day	March 15
Buzzards Day	March 15
Digital Cleanup Day	March 15, 2025
National Panda Day	March 16
Global Recycling Day	March 18
World Serval Day	March 18
Taxonomist Appreciation Day	March 19
World Sparrow Day	March 20
World Frog Day	March 20
World Rewilding Day	March 20
International Day of Forests	March 21
World Planting Day	March 21
World Wood Day	March 21
World Water Day	March 22
International Seal Day	March 22
World Meteorological Day	March 23
International Day of Zero Waste	March 30
World Aquatic Animal Day	April 3
World Rat Day	April 4
International Beaver Day	April 7
Zoo Lovers Day	April 8
Arbor Day	April 26
Bat Appreciation Day	April 17
Earth Day	April 22
International Pallas's Cat day	April 23
World Day for Laboratory Animals	April 24
World Tapir Day	April 27
International Hyena Day	April 27
Day of Remembrance for all Victims of Chemical Warfare	April 29
Green Up Day	First Saturday of May in Vermont
World Tuna Day	May 2
International Leopard Day	May 3
Wild Koala Day	May 3
Greenery Day	May 4 in Japan (previously April 29)
World Donkey Day	May 8
Go Public Gardens Days	Friday before to the Sunday after Mother's Day
World Migratory Bird Day	Second Saturday of May. Second Saturday of May in the U.S. and Canada; Second Saturday of October in Mexico, Central and South America, and the Caribbean.
World Binturong Day	Second Saturday of May.
Endangered Species Day	Third Friday of May
International Toad Day	May 15
Bike-to-Work Day	Third Friday of May
World Bee Day	May 20
International Day for Biological Diversity (World Biodiversity Day)	May 22
World Turtle Day	May 23
Taxonomy Recognition Day	May 23
European Day of Parks – Europarc Federation	May 24
World Otter Day	last Wednesday of May
World Dugong Day	May 28
Black Birders Week	May 29
World No Tobacco Day	May 31
World Parrot Day	May 31
World Reef Day	June 1
World Peatlands Day	June 2
World Bicycle Day	June 3
World Environment Day	June 5
Solomon Memorial Day	June 5
World Oceans Day	June 8
Coral Triangle Day	June 9
International Lynx Day	June 11
National Cougar Day	June 12
Global Wind Day	June 15
World Sea Turtle Day	June 16
World Day to Combat Desertification and Drought	June 17
World Croc Day	June 17
World Horseshoe Crab Day	June 20
World Giraffe Day	June 21
World Camel Day	June 22
World Rainforest Day	June 22
Black Birders Week	June 24
World Decarbonisation Day	June 25
World Population Day	July 11
Shark Awareness Day	July 14
World Chimpanzee Day	July 14
World Orca Day	July 14
World Snake Day	July 16
Earth Overshoot Day	Advanced to July 24 in 2025
International Day for the Conservation of the Mangrove Ecosystems	July 26
World Nature Conservation Day	July 28
International Tiger Day	July 29
World Ranger Day – International Ranger Federation	July 31
International Clouded Leopard Day	August 4
World Tomistoma Day	August 5
International Cat Day	August 8
International Moon Bear Day	August 8
World Lion Day	August 10
World Elephant Day	August 12
World Hirola Day	August 12
International Wolf Day	August 13
World Lizard Day	August 14
National Honey Bee Day (US only)	August 15
Scimitar-Horned Oryx Day	August 16
World Orangutan Day	August 19
World Mosquito Day	August 20
International Dog Day	August 26
International Whale Shark Day	August 30
World Beach Day, aka National Beach Day	September 1
International Primate Day	September 1
Japan Dolphin Day	September 1
Amazon Rainforest Day	September 5
International Vulture Awareness Day	First Saturday of September
International Day of Clean Air for blue skies	September 7
World Dolphin Day	September 12
International Colugo Day	September 15
International Day for the Preservation of the Ozone Layer	September 16
World Manta Day	September 17
World Water Monitoring Day	September 18
PARK(ing) Day	Third Friday in September
World Cleanup Day	September 16, 2023, Third Saturday in September
National Cleanup Day	September 18, 2021, Third Saturday in September
International Red Panda Day	Third Saturday of September
Zero Emissions Day	September 21
World Dates Day	September 22
World Rhino Day	September 22
World Gorilla Day	September 24
World Environmental Health Day	September 26 since 2011 (IFEH)
World Cassowary Day	September 26
International Day of Awareness of Food Loss and Waste	September 29
World Rivers Day	Last Sunday of September
Australian Wildlife Week	First Week of October
International Raccoon Appreciation Day	October 1
World Farm Animals Day	October 2
World Habitat Day	First Monday of October
World Animal Day	October 4
National Badger Day	October 6
World Octopus Day	October 8
Mazingira Day	October 10
Energy Efficiency Day	First Wednesday in October
International Day for Natural Disaster Reduction	October 13
International E-Waste Day	October 14
International Sawfish Day	October 17
Stepping Stone Day	October 17
Sustainability Day!	Fourth Wednesday of October
World Okapi Day	October 18
International Sloth Day	October 20
National Reptile Awareness Day	October 21
World Earthworm Day	October 21
International Wombat Day	October 22
International Snow Leopard Day	October 23
Freshwater Dolphin Day	October 24
International Gibbon Day	October 24
International Day of Climate Action	October 24
World Lemur Day	Last Friday of October
World Ecology Day	November 1
World Vegan Day	November 1
World Basking Shark Day	November 3
International Day for Preventing the Exploitation of the Environment in War and Armed Conflict	November 6
National Bison Day	First Saturday in November
America Recycles Day	November 15
World Fisheries Day	November 21
International Jaguar Day	November 29
International Cheetah Day	December 4
Wildlife Conservation Day	December 4
World Soil Day	December 5
International Mountain Day	December 11
Monkey Day	December 14
Ozone Action Day	Variable date depending weather conditions
eDay – Electronic Waste Day	Variable date, in New Zealand
World Fish Migration Day	Variable date (next one - 23 May 2026)

== Weeks ==
Name	Date
tUrn Climate Crisis Awareness and Action Week	April 19–23, 2021
Great Backyard Bird Count	2025 date, February 14–17
Invasive Species Awareness Week	Last Week of February
Green Office Week	2016 date, April 18–22
Keep Australia Beautiful Week	Last Full Week of August
National Green Week	First week in February every year in the United States
National Wildlife Week	
National Dark-Sky Week	Week of new moon in April
Bike to Work Week Victoria	
National Pollinator Week	Third Week in June
Mosquito Awareness Week	June 22–28
Plastic Free July	July 1–31
National Clean Beaches Week	July 1–7
Van Mohatsav Saptah (Forest Festival Week)	
Conservation Week	
World Water Week	August 26–31
European Mobility Week	September 16–22
Bike Week	Second week in June
Recycle Week	June 20–26, 2011
Zero Waste Week	First Week of September
Green Office Week	
European Week for Waste Reduction (EWWR)	Last complete week in November, 9 days
Science Literacy Week (Canada)	September 16–22
No Car Day	Week of September 22 in China
World Water Week in Stockholm	August or September, annual
National Op Shop Week (Australia)	August 21–27
World Oceans Week	June 1–8
National Herbal Medicine Week	Each year for the last week in October
International Compost Awareness Week	First Full Week in May

== Years ==
Name	Date
International Polar Year	1882–1883
International Polar Year	1932–1933
International Year of the Child	1979
World Population Year	1974
International Year of the Ocean (IYO)	1998
International Year of Mountains (IYM)	2002
International Year of Ecotourism (IYE)	2002
International Year of Freshwater (IYF)	2003
International Year of Deserts and Desertification	2006
International Year of the Dolphin	2007–2008
International Polar Year	2007–2009
International Year of Planet Earth	2008
International Year of Sanitation	2008
International Year of Natural Fibres 2009	2009
Year of the Gorilla	2009
International Year of Biodiversity	2010
International Year of Forests	2011
International Year of Soils	2015
International Year of Pulses	2016
International Year of Sustainable tourism for all	2017
International Year of Indigenous languages	2019
International Year of Plant Health	2020
International Year of Fruits and Vegetables	2021

=== Agriculture ===
YEAR	EVENTS
2004	International year of rice
2005	International year of parthenium
2006	International year of desert and desertification
2007	International year of water
2008	International year of potato
2009	International year of natural fibres
2010	International year of biodiversity
2011	International year of forest
2012	International year of cooperative (Also celebrated as National year of horticulture)
2013	International year of water cooperation
2014	International year of family farming
2015	International year of soil and Light
2016	International year of pulses (theme- nutritious seed for sustainable agriculture)
2017	International year of sustainable tourism
2018	Recommended for International year of millets (Declared as National year of millets)
2019	International year of Indigenous language
2020	International Year of Plant Health
2021	International Year of Creative Economy for Sustainable Development. And also International Year of Fruits and Vegetables
2022	International Year of Artisanal Fisheries and Aquaculture
2023	International year of Millets
2024	International Year of Camelids

== Decades ==
Name	Date
International Drinking Water Decade, 1981–90	1980s
International Decade for Natural Disaster Reduction	1990s
United Nations Decade of Education for Sustainable Development	2005–2014
Water for Life Decade	2005–2015
United Nations Decade on Biodiversity	2011–2020
United Nations Decade for Deserts and the Fight against Desertification	2010–2020
United Nations Decade on Ecosystem Restoration	2021–2030

== See also ==
- Index of environmental articles
  - List of environmental issues
  - List of years in the environment
- Index of conservation articles
  - List of conservation issues
- International observance
- List of awareness days
- List of commemorative days
- List of international environmental agreements
- List of commemorative months
