= Our Seas Our Future =

New Zealand non-profit organization

- Our Seas Our Future logo used from 2012 – present
- Founded: 2011
- Founder: Noel Jhinku
- Type: NGO
- Purpose: Marine conservation
- Location: New Zealand
- Website: osof.org

Our Seas Our Future (OSOF) is an ENGO group based in New Zealand. OSOF operates as a volunteer driven, non-profit initiative that focuses on coastal and marine conservation advocacy and community engagement projects in New Zealand.

== Logo ==
The current OSOF logo was designed by the Dunedin-based company Studio 3 Design Limited, situated on the Otago Peninsula. The logo encompasses four ocean waves in a stylised Koru swirl design. Two large stylised waves flow into each other in synchrony, and two small waves offshoot from the sides of the central wave complex. The logo was commissioned by Noel Jhinku in 2012.

== History ==
The original concept behind the OSOF initiative was to encourage the public to learn more about the oceans, using social media as a tool to communicate information. In November 2011, OSOF was launched as an online campaign on the social media platform Facebook to highlight conservation issues that collectively impact the marine and coastal environment. A broad range of topics and issues were addressed including marine pollution, marine wildlife conservation, overfishing and other resource exploitation activities such as offshore drilling.

OSOF continued to expand their social media support base during 2012, and the scope of published content shifted focus to include educational and advocacy related information and conservation efforts relevant to New Zealand and the Pacific regions. During this period, more emphasis was placed on content creation, with the OSOF campaigns building a resource base of marine educational material that could be easily accessed and shared via social media. By the end of 2012, OSOF's social media presence on Facebook was separated and structured into stand-alone campaigns that focused on specific areas of interest. OSOF's social media campaigning is primarily focused on Facebook, however OSOF is also represented on Twitter and YouTube.

In June 2012, OSOF organised their first coastal clean-up event in Dunedin, New Zealand. This event celebrated World Oceans Day, and was the unofficial launch of OSOF's community engagement initiatives outside of social media, an attempt to promote environmental conservation and education directly to the community. Coastal clean-up events have been organised on a regular basis annually since June 2012, and advertised through their social media channels. Major clean-up events were organised to coincide with key national and international events such as NZAEE Seaweek, World Oceans Day, Keep New Zealand Beautiful Week, and Conservation Week. Smaller scale clean-up events were organised at various times during the year, as needed and where volunteer interest and resources have been available. In October 2013, the Adopt-a-Coast project was developed and directed at school groups to get involved in coastal clean-up events and marine environmental education.

From mid 2013, OSOF added policy submissions to their project structure and was involved in writing submissions for coastal and marine related policy consultations at the central and local government level.

In early April 2014, the OSOF website is planned to be launched as a strategic move to disseminate information to the non-social media using community and to establish an online presence outside of social media. The website design was developed and sponsored by the Dunedin-based company Blackline Media Ltd.

To date, OSOF has relied entirely on volunteer time and resources to support their ongoing projects.

== Awards ==
OSOF was awarded the 2012 top environmental prize for an environmental project by a community group in Dunedin, New Zealand, as a result of their regular clean-up events. The 'Pod' environmental award is awarded annually by the Keep Dunedin Beautiful Committee.

OSOF won the NZAEE Seaweek 'Ocean Champion' award in 2014. The theme for NZAEE's Seaweek 2014 was "Our fragile, finite taonga – be alert to the fragility of the marine environment and its treasures. Kia mataara! Tiakina te au o te moana, he kōpīpī tōna". OSOF was recognised for their regular coastal clean-up events and environmental education initiatives.

OSOF was awarded the Keep New Zealand Beautiful Tidy Kiwi Award in 2014. The KNZB Tidy Kiwi Award recognises and rewards an individual or team who have distinguished themselves as truly extraordinary and serve as an inspiration to us all. The Award honours outstanding and exceptional leadership in litter prevention, waste reduction/recycling and beautification activities.

OSOF was awarded the KNZB Outstanding Service Award in 2015.

== Campaigns ==
The OSOF project structure is divided into three broad categories that cover digital media campaigning, collaborative projects, and OSOF core projects:

=== Digital media campaigns ===
OSOF's digital media strategy primarily focuses on using social media platforms to disseminate information to a wide audience, relying on the power of social networks to engage the public. OSOF currently runs three stand-alone campaigns on the social media platform Facebook to raise awareness about topics and current issues in coastal and marine conservation. These campaigns were initially included in OSOF's main social media page, and later separated to focus on specific areas of interest. OSOF also collaborates with independent film makers and artists to produce short films and videos that highlight marine conservation and environmental education.

==== Plastic Free New Zealand ====
Plastic Free New Zealand is a brand highlighting the effect of plastics and other anthropogenic materials on our environment, while advocating for more for environmentally friendly solutions.

==== Sustainable Seafood Now ====
‘Sustainable Seafood Now’ is a brand highlighting what is happening in the world’s fisheries, while advocating for a sustainable fishing industry both in New Zealand and worldwide. The goal of this brand is to raise public awareness in New Zealand about the current state of fisheries and the need to implement better systems for managing this resource.

==== New Zealand Marine Reserves ====
More Marine Reserves is a brand advocating for the establishment of more marine reserves in Aotearoa/New Zealand. The goal of this brand is to raise public awareness in New Zealand about the need to protect our coastal and marine environments through the establishment of marine reserve networks that will enable protection of a wide range of biodiversity.

==== Climate Action Now ====
Climate Action Now is a brand highlighting the effects of climate change on our natural environment and society. The goal of this brand is to raise public awareness in New Zealand about the effects of global warming on our oceans including acidification, melting ice sheets and rising sea levels, and to particularly highlight the impacts of anthropogenic climate change on small island nations and coastal regions.

==== Short films ====
In July 2012, a short film was produced for OSOF that highlighted the plight of the endemic New Zealand sea lion, titled "Up The Creek Without A Flipper". The production was filmed and edited by Sean Mueller, with non-scripted narration by Suzanne Burns, and soundtrack by Hera Hjartardottir. Filming took place over a one-day period on location at Sandfly Bay, Otago, New Zealand. The film also features the endemic yellow-eyed penguin found on the Otago coastline. This short film was OSOF's first documentary project to highlight species conservation.

=== Collaborative projects ===
OSOF was an alliance member of the New Zealand Shark Alliance, working towards banning shark finning in New Zealand waters. The NZSA successfully helped change the laws in 2014 to enable better protection of sharks in New Zealand.

=== OSOF core projects ===
OSOF's core projects focus primarily on community engagement in environmental conservation and education, through initiatives such as coastal clean-up events and marine conservation advocacy.

==== Coastal clean-up events ====
OSOF coordinates regular regional coastal clean-up events to remove anthropogenic rubbish from coastal environments while raising awareness about the effects of marine pollution.

==== Adopt-a-Coast ====
In October 2013, OSOF developed and piloted the Adopt-A-Coast initiative, with a goal to integrate marine conservation and science into school projects. This project allows students to ‘adopt’ an area of coastline by visiting regularly to carry out a coastal clean-up, followed by surveying the local intertidal zones to assess biodiversity of the area. The coastal clean-up component involves students picking up litter from their adopted coast, followed by the survey component that uses the Marine Metre Square program developed by the University of Otago. The Adopt-A-Coast project was piloted with a group of Year 9 students from Kavanagh College, Dunedin, New Zealand.
