= New Zealand Shark Alliance =

The New Zealand Shark Alliance is an umbrella group of non-governmental organizations (NGOs), united in a campaign to ban shark finning in New Zealand waters and protect its sharks. The group includes the World Wide Fund for Nature, Royal Forest and Bird Protection Society of New Zealand, Greenpeace, Sea Shepherd Conservation Society, Shark Fin-Free Auckland, Our Seas Our Future, Environment and Conservation Organisations of Aotearoa New Zealand, White Shark Conservation Trust, New Zealand Underwater Association, The ITM Fishing Show, Kelly Tarlton's Sea Life Aquarium, and Earthrace Conservation.

The Alliance was formed in 2012 and campaigned to bring New Zealand shark laws in line with other countries. The alliance holds the view that, if the fishing industry is going to catch sharks, that sharks should be fished sustainably. The sharks should be killed and brought to shore complete with their fins naturally attached. The Alliance believes this internationally recommended approach will cease the wasteful practice of only slaughtering sharks for their fins.
