= International Day for the Preservation of the Ozone Layer =

Commemoration of the Montreal Protocol

- Ozone hole over Southern Hemisphere in 1957–2001
- Observed by: UN Members
- Date: 16 September
- Next time: 16 September 2026
- Frequency: Annual
- First time: 1994

International Day for the Preservation of the Ozone Layer (informally and simply called Ozone Day) is celebrated on September 16 designed by the United Nations General Assembly. This designation had been made on December 19, 2000, in commemoration of the date, in 1987, on which nations signed the Montreal Protocol on Substances that Deplete the Ozone Layer. In 1994, the UN General Assembly proclaimed 16 September the International Day for the Preservation of the Ozone Layer, commemorating the date of the signing, in 1987, of the Montreal Protocol on Substances that Deplete the Ozone Layer. The closure of the hole in the ozone layer was observed 30 years after the protocol was signed. Due to the nature of the gases responsible for ozone depletion their chemical effects are expected to continue for between 50 and 100 years.

== Substance regulation and phase-out ==
Under the Montreal Protocol, parties commit to reducing the consumption and production of ozone-depleting substances (ODS). The treaty outlines a schedule for the phase-out of key substances such as CFCs, HCFCs, and halons. The Kigali Amendment to the Montreal Protocol, agreed upon in 2016, included provisions for the phase-down of HFCs, which are potent greenhouse gases but do not deplete the ozone layer.

== Global impact and ratification ==
The Montreal Protocol is widely regarded as one of the most successful environmental agreements to date, having achieved universal ratification. Its implementation has led to the recovery of the ozone layer and contributed significantly to mitigating climate change. The Protocol's effectiveness is attributed to its dynamic structure, which allows for periodic updates and revisions based on scientific and technological progress.

== Themes by year ==
The United Nations designates a specific theme each year for the International Day for the Preservation of the Ozone Layer to highlight different facets of ozone protection.

- 2015: 30 Years of Healing the Ozone Together.
- 2016: Ozone and climate: Restored by a world united.
- 2017: Caring for all life under the sun.
- 2018: Keep Cool and Carry On.
- 2019: 32 Years and Healing.
- 2020: Ozone for life: 35 years of ozone layer protection.
- 2021: Montreal Protocol - Keeping us, our food and vaccines cool.
- 2022: Montreal Protocol@35: global cooperation protecting life on earth.
- 2023: Montreal Protocol: fixing the ozone layer and reducing climate change.
- 2024: Montreal Protocol: Advancing Climate Action.
- 2025: From science to global action.
- 2026: Global action for a cooler planet.

== See also ==
- List of environmental dates
- Scientific Assessment of Ozone Depletion
