= World Environment Day =

UN awareness effort to protect the environment

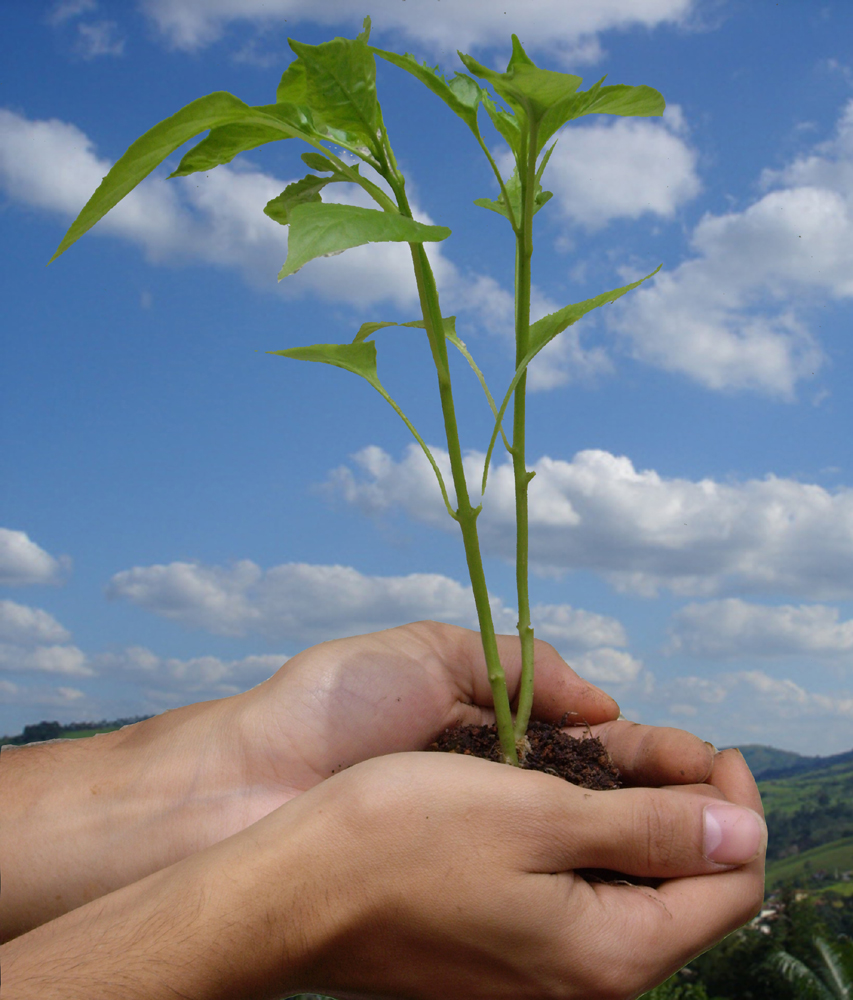
- Official name: UN World Environment Day
- Also called: Eco Day, Environment Day, WED
- Type: International
- Significance: Environmental issues awareness
- Observances: Environment Protection
- Date: 5 June
- Next time: 5 June 2027
- First time: 5 June 1973; 53 years ago

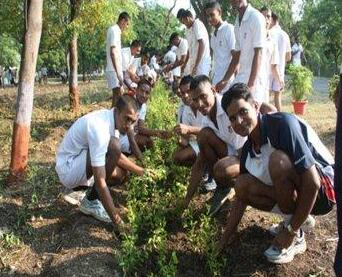
World Environment Day in India

World Environment Day (WED) is celebrated annually on 5 June and encourages awareness and action for the protection of the environment. It is supported by many non-government organizations, businesses, government entities, and represents the primary United Nations outreach day supporting the environment.

First held in 1973, it has been a platform for raising awareness on environmental issues such as marine pollution, overpopulation, global warming, sustainable development, and wildlife crime. World Environment Day is a global platform for public outreach, with participation from over 143 countries annually, including participation from Argentina, Australia, Austria, Brazil, Canada, Chile, Denmark, Finland, France, Germany, India, Israel, Italy, Japan, Mexico, the Netherlands, Norway, the Philippines, Poland, South Africa, Spain, Switzerland, Thailand and the United States. Every year, the program has provided a theme and forum for businesses, non-government organizations, communities, politicians and stars to advocate environmental causes.

== History ==
World Environment Day was established in 1972 by the United Nations at the Stockholm Conference on the Human Environment (5–16 June 1972), following discussions on integrating human activities with the environment. One year later, in 1973, the first WED was held with the theme "Only one earth".

== Host cities ==
World Environment Day celebrations have been (and will be) hosted in the following cities:

Year	Theme	Host city
1972	Stockholm Conference on Human Environment	Stockholm, United Nations
1973	Only One Earth	Geneva, Switzerland
1974	Only one Earth during Expo '74	Spokane, United States
1975	Human Settlements	Chandigarh, India
1976	Water: Vital Resource for Life	Ontario, Canada
1977	Ozone Layer Environmental Concern; Lands Loss and Soil Degradation	Delhi, India
1978	Development Without Destruction	Sylhet, Bangladesh
1979	Only One Future for Our Children – Development Without Destruction	Sylhet, Bangladesh
1980	A New Challenge for the New Decade: Development Without Destruction	Sylhet, Bangladesh
1981	Ground Water; Toxic Chemicals in Human Food Chains	Sylhet, Bangladesh
1982	Ten Years After Stockholm (Renewal of Environmental Concerns)	Dhaka, Bangladesh
1983	Managing and Disposing Hazardous Waste: Acid Rain and Energy	Sylhet, Bangladesh
1984	Desertification	Rajshahi, Bangladesh
1985	Youth: Population and the Environment	Islamabad, Pakistan
1986	A Tree for Peace	Ontario, Canada
1987	Environment and Shelter: More Than A Roof	Nairobi, Kenya
1988	When People Put the Environment First, Development Will Last	Bangkok, Thailand
1989	Global Warming; Global Warning	Brussels, Belgium
1990	Children and the Environment	Mexico City, Mexico
1991	Climate Change. Need for Global Partnership	Stockholm, Sweden
1992	Only One Earth, Care and Share	Rio de Janeiro, Brazil
1993	Poverty and the Environment – Breaking the Vicious Circle	Beijing, China
1994	One Earth One Family	London, United Kingdom
1995	We the Peoples: United for the Global Environment	Pretoria, South Africa
1996	Our Earth, Our Habitat, Our Home	Istanbul, Turkey
1997	For Life on Earth	Seoul, South Korea
1998	For Life on Earth – Save Our Seas	Moscow, Russia
1999	Our Earth – Our Future – Just Save It!	Tokyo, Japan
2000	The Environment Millennium – Time to Act	Adelaide, Australia
2001	Connect with the World Wide Web of Life	Turin, Italy and Havana, Cuba
2002	Give Earth a Chance	Shenzhen, China
2003	Water – Two Billion People are Dying for It!	Beirut, Lebanon
2004	Wanted! Seas and Oceans – Dead or Alive?	Barcelona, Spain
2005	Green Cities – Plant for the Planet!	San Francisco, United States
2006	Deserts and Desertification – Don't Desert Drylands!	Algiers, Algeria
2007	Melting Ice – a Hot Topic?	London, United Kingdom
2008	Kick The Habit – Towards A Low Carbon Economy	Wellington, New Zealand
2009	Your Planet Needs You – Unite to Combat Climate Change	Mexico City, Mexico
2010	Many Species. One Planet. One Future	Rangpur, Bangladesh
2011	Forests: Nature at your Service	Delhi, India
2012	Green Economy: Does it include you?	Brasília, Brazil
2013	Think.Eat.Save. Reduce Your Foodprint	Ulaanbaatar, Mongolia
2014	Raise your voice, not the sea level	Bridgetown, Barbados
2015	Seven Billion Dreams. One Planet. Consume with Care.	Rome, Italy
2016	Zero Tolerance for the Illegal Wildlife trade	Luanda, Angola
2017	Connecting People to Nature – in the city and on the land, from the poles to the equator	Ottawa, Canada
2018	Beat Plastic Pollution	New Delhi, India
2019	Beat Air Pollution	China
2020	Time for Nature	Colombia
2021	Ecosystem restoration	Pakistan
2022	Only One Earth	Sweden
2023	Solutions to Plastic Pollution	Ivory Coast
2024	Land restoration, desertification and drought resilience	Riyadh, Saudi Arabia
2025	Ending plastic pollution	South Korea
2026	Climate action	Baku, Azerbaijan

== Annual themes, major initiatives, and accomplishments ==
=== 2005 ===
Standard WED banners hung in San Francisco in May 2005

The theme for the 2005 World Environment Day was "Green Cities" and the slogan was "Plant for the Planet!".

=== 2006 ===
The topic for WED 2006 was Deserts and Desertification and the slogan was "Don't desert drylands". The main international celebrations of World Environment Day 2006 were held in Algeria

=== 2007 ===
The topic for World Environment Day in 2007 was "Melting Ice – a Hot Topic?" During International Polar Year, WED 2007 focused on the effects of climate change on polar ecosystems and communities, other ice- and snow-covered areas of the world, and the resulting global impacts.

The main international celebrations of WED 2007 were held in Tromsø, Norway, a city north of the Arctic Circle.

Egypt issued a postage stamp for the 2007 World Environment Day.

=== 2008 ===
The host for World Environment Day 2008 was New Zealand, with the main international celebrations scheduled for Wellington. The slogan for 2008 was "CO_{2}, Kick the Habit! Towards a Low Carbon Economy." New Zealand was one of the first countries to pledge to achieve carbon-neutrality, and will also focus on forest management as a tool for reducing greenhouse gases.

The Chicago Botanic Garden served as the North American host for World Environment Day on 5 June 2008.

=== 2009 ===
The theme for WED 2009 was "Your Planet Needs You – UNite to Combat Climate Change", and Michael Jackson's "Earth Song" was declared "World Environment Day Song". It was hosted in Mexico.

=== 2010 ===
"Many Species, One Planet, One Future" was the theme of 2010.

It celebrated the diversity of life on Earth as part of the 2010 International Year of Biodiversity. It was hosted in Rwanda. Thousands of activities were organized worldwide, including beach cleanups, concerts, exhibits, film festivals, community events, and more. Each continent (except Antarctica) had a "regional host city", the UN chose Pittsburgh, Pennsylvania as the host for all North.

=== 2011 ===
The theme for 2011 was 'Forests – Nature At Your Service'. Thousands of activities were organized worldwide, with beach cleanups, concerts, exhibits, film festivals, community events, tree plantings and much more. India hosted it.

=== 2012 ===
The theme for the 2012 World Environment Day was Green Economy.

The theme aimed to invite people to examine their activities and lifestyle and see how the concept of a "Green Economy" fits into it. The host country for the year's celebrations was Brazil.

=== 2013 ===
The 2013 theme for World Environment Day was "Think.Eat.Save".

The campaign addressed the huge annual food waste and losses, which, if conserved, would release a large quantity of food and reduce the overall carbon footprint. The campaign aimed to raise awareness in countries with lifestyles that lead to food waste. It also aimed to empower people to make informed choices about the food they eat, thereby reducing the overall ecological impact of worldwide food production. The host country for the year's celebrations was Mongolia.

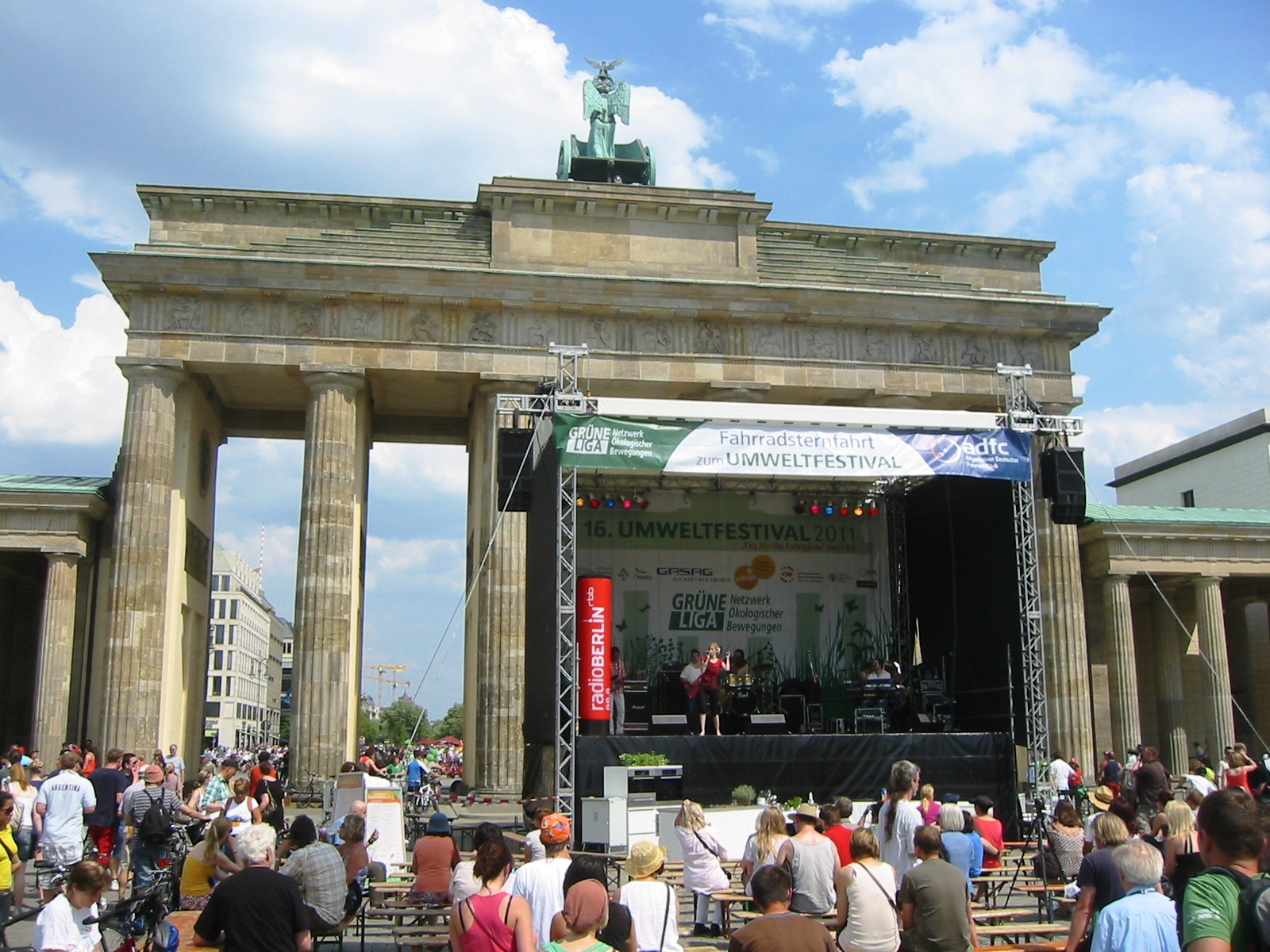
Stage in front of the Brandenburg Gate on Environmental Festival 2011

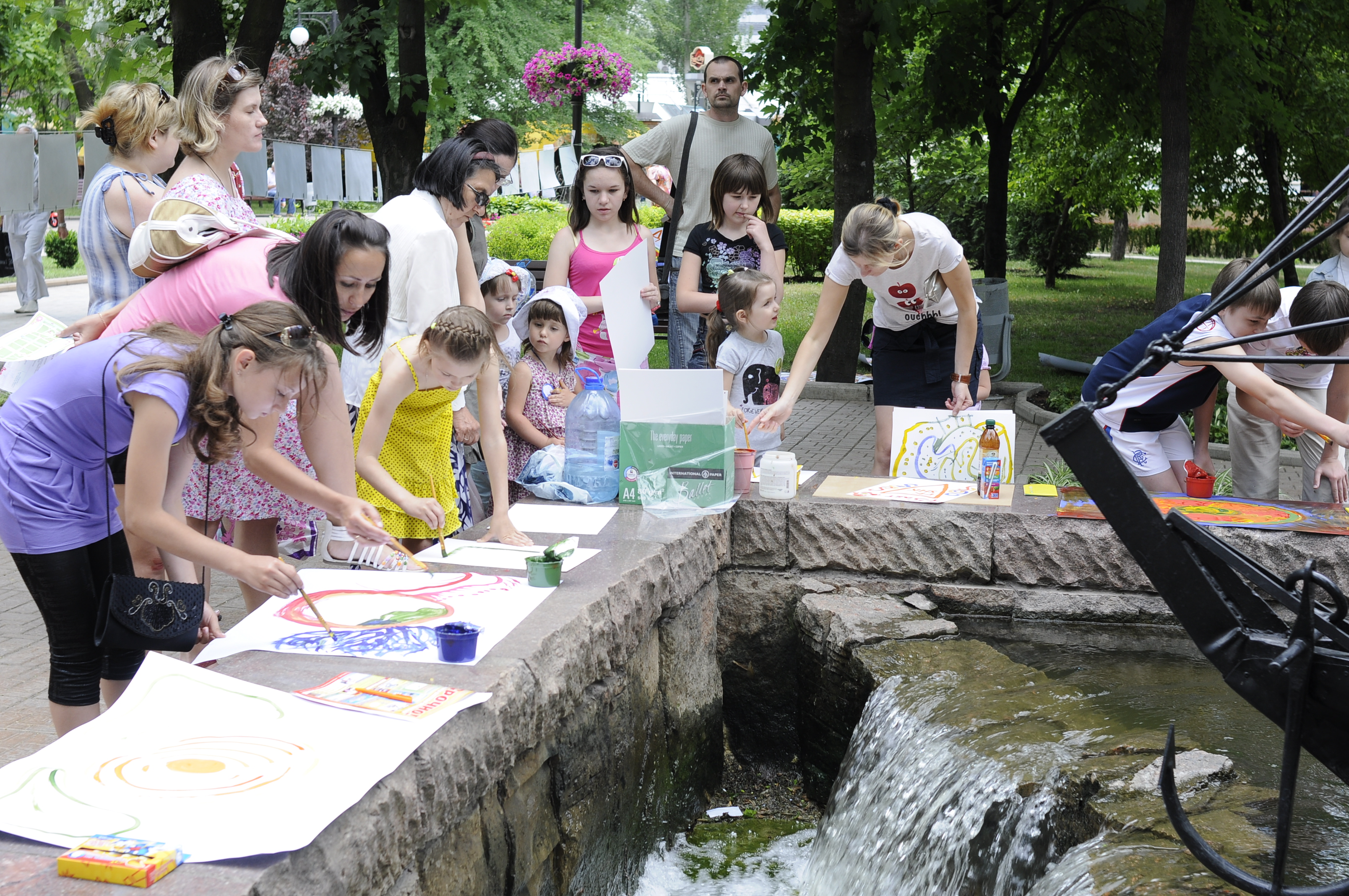
World Environment Day 2011 in Donetsk, Ukraine

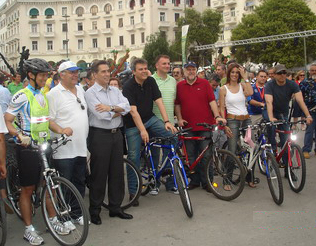
US Consul CG Yee, along with the Mayor of Thessaloniki, Vassilis Papageorgopoulos, the Prefect of Thessaloniki, Panagiotis Psomiadis, and many others participating in World Environment Day on the waterfront bike path

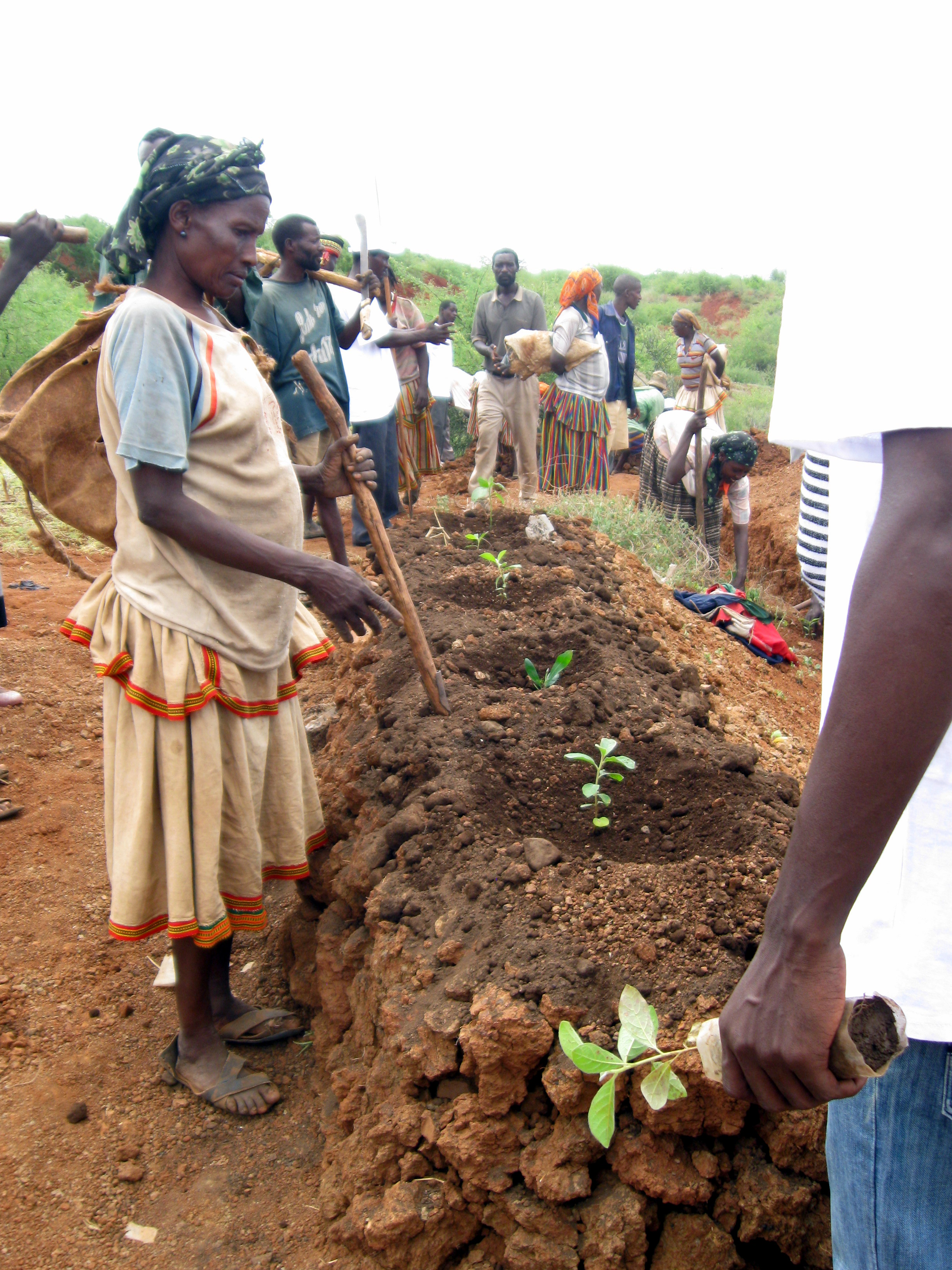
Trees planting during the World Environment Day 2012 in Konso, Ethiopia

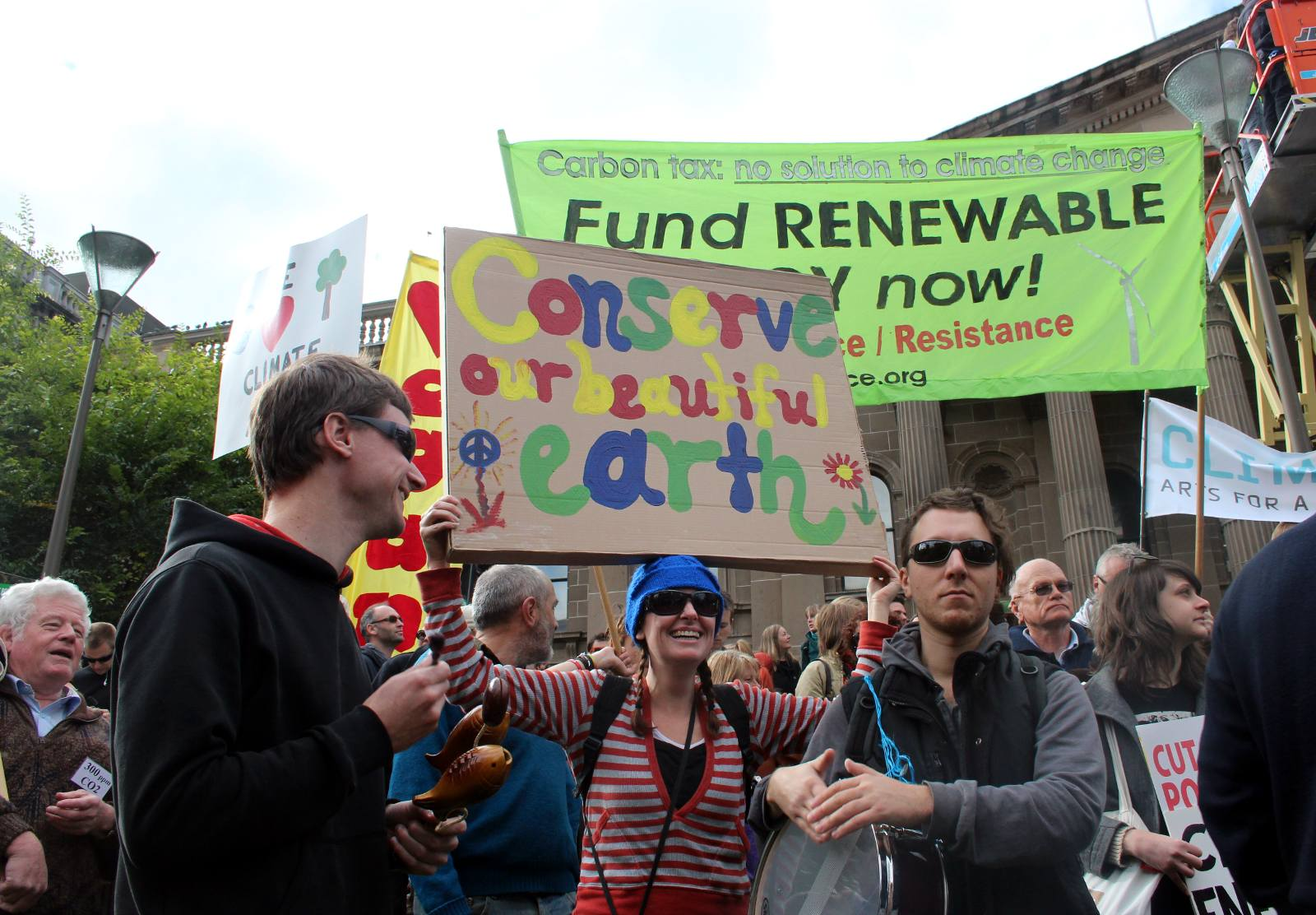
People in Melbourne celebrate World Environment Day 2011 with a rally to fund renewable energy.

=== 2014 ===
The Theme of the 2014 WED was the International Year of Small Island Developing States (SIDS). By choosing this theme, the UN General Assembly aimed to highlight the development Challenges and successes of the SIDS. In 2014, World Environment Day focused on global warming and its impact on ocean levels. The slogan of the WED 2014 is "Raise your voice not the sea level", as Barbados hosted the global celebrations of the 42nd edition of the World Environment Day. The UN Environment Programme named actor Ian Somerhalder as the official Goodwill ambassador of the WED 2014.

=== 2015 ===
The slogan of the 2015 edition of World Environment Day was "Seven Billion Dreams. One Planet. Consume with Care". The slogan was chosen through a social media voting process. In Saudi Arabia, 15 women recycled 2000 plastic bags to crochet a mural in support of the WED 2015. In India, Narendra Modi planted a Kadamb sapling to celebrate the World Environment Day and raise awareness for the environment. Italy is the host country of the 43rd edition of the WED. The celebrations took place as part of Milan Expo around the theme: Feeding the Planet – Energy for Life.

=== 2016 ===
The 2016 WED was organized under the theme "Go wild for life". This edition of the WED aimed to reduce and prevent the illegal wildlife trade. Angola was chosen as the host country of the 2016 WED during the COP21 in Paris.

=== 2017 ===
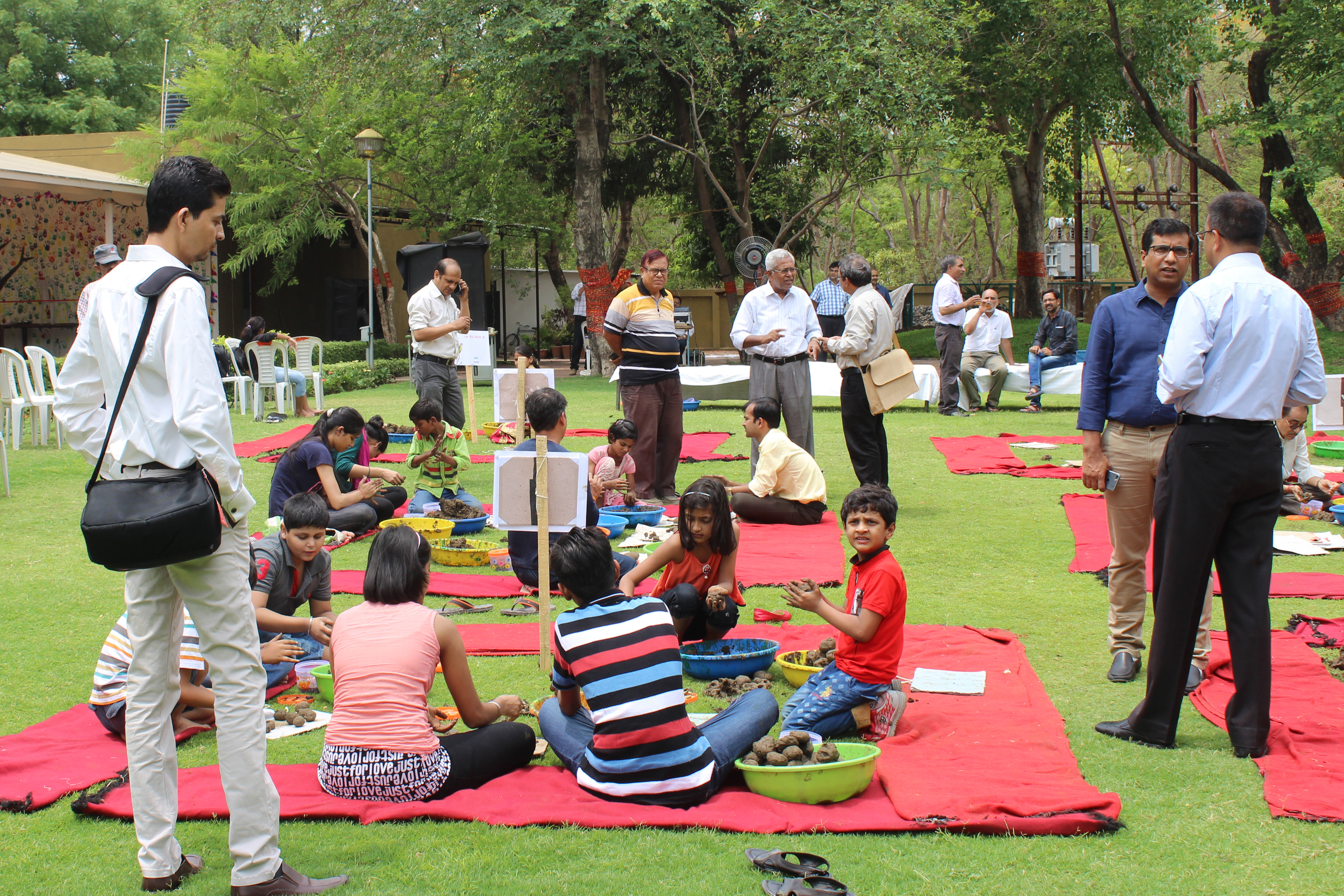
Activities for World Environment Day in Bhopal, India

The theme for 2017 was "Connecting People to Nature – in the city and on the land, from the poles to the equator". The host nation was Canada.

=== 2018 ===
The theme for 2018 was "Beat Plastic Pollution". The host nation was India. By choosing this theme, it is hoped that people may strive to change their everyday lives to reduce the heavy burden of plastic pollution. People should be free from overreliance on single-use or disposable products, as they have severe environmental consequences. We should liberate our natural places, our wildlife, and our own health from plastics. The Indian government pledged to eliminate all single use of plastic in India by 2022.

=== 2019 ===
The theme for 2019 was "Beat Air Pollution". The host nation was China. This theme was chosen as air pollution causes about 7 million premature deaths annually.

In Réunion Island, Miss Earth 2018 Nguyễn Phương Khánh from Vietnam delivered her speech during World Environment Day with the theme "How to fight global warming".

=== 2020 ===
The theme for 2020 was "Time for Nature", and was hosted in Colombia in partnership with Germany.

Colombia is one of the largest megadiverse countries in the world and holds close to 10% of the planet's biodiversity. Since it is part of the Amazon rainforest, Colombia ranks first in bird and orchid species diversity and second in plants, butterflies, freshwater fish, and amphibians.

=== 2021 ===
The theme for 2021 was "Ecosystem Restoration", and was hosted by Pakistan. On this occasion, the UN Decade of Ecosystem Restoration was also launched.

=== 2022 ===
The theme for 2022 was "Only One Earth", and Sweden hosted the event. 2022 marks 50 years since the Stockholm Conference, which led to the designation of 5 June as World Environment Day.

=== 2023 ===
The theme for 2023 was "Solution to plastic pollution", and the event was hosted by Ivory Coast. It is a reminder that people's actions on plastic pollution matter. The steps governments and businesses are taking to tackle plastic pollution are a consequence of this action. It is time to accelerate this action and transition to a circular economy.

=== 2024 ===
World Environment Day 2024 focused on land restoration, desertification, and drought resilience. The Kingdom of Saudi Arabia highlighted its role in addressing these challenges through national and regional initiatives such as the Saudi Green Initiative and the Middle East Green Initiative, as well as global efforts including the Global Land Restoration Initiative.

=== 2025 ===
World Environment Day 2025 focused on ending plastic pollution, with the Republic of Korea hosting the global celebrations. The campaign highlighted the widespread impact of plastic pollution on ecosystems, food systems, and human health, while emphasising that it remains one of the most solvable environmental challenges, with practical, accessible solutions.

=== 2026 ===
World Environment Day 2026 focused on climate change. United Nations' campaign was "#NowForClimate." Azerbaijan held the event, which was hosted at the Heydar Aliyev Center in Baku. The event invited the international community to cooperate, share solutions and progress upon three themes: Biodiversity conservation, by restoring degraded ecosystems along the Caspian Sea, climate action, by aligning with the Paris Agreement, and renewable energy.

== Plastic pollution awareness during World Environment Day ==
Plastic pollution has been increasingly highlighted as a major environmental concern during World Environment Day observances. The issue involves the accumulation of plastic waste in terrestrial and marine ecosystems, where it can persist for decades and pose risks to wildlife, biodiversity, and human health.

International organizations, including the United Nations Environment Programme (UNEP), have emphasized plastic pollution as a global challenge due to its widespread environmental impact and the growing presence of microplastics in water systems and food chains. Single-use plastics, in particular, have been identified as a significant contributor to global waste generation.

World Environment Day campaigns in recent years have focused on raising awareness about plastic consumption, waste management practices, and the need for sustainable alternatives. These campaigns often encourage governments, industries, and individuals to reduce plastic use, improve recycling systems, and support circular-economy models.

Environmental research indicates that reducing plastic pollution requires coordinated efforts involving policy measures, corporate responsibility, and behavioral change. As a result, plastic pollution has become a recurring theme in environmental awareness initiatives associated with World Environment Day.

== See also ==
- Arbor Day
- Earth Day
- Index of environmental articles
- List of environmental dates
- List of environmental protests
- United Nations Conference on the Human Environment
