= International Year of Soils =

2015 UN theme year

The International Year of Soils, 2015 (IYS 2015) was declared by the Sixty-eighth session of the United Nations General Assembly on December 20, 2013, after recognizing December 5 as World Soil Day.

The purpose of the IYS was to raise awareness worldwide of the importance of soils for food security, agriculture, as well as in mitigation of climate change, poverty alleviation, and sustainable development.

== World Soil Day ==
The Soil Science Society of America (SSSA) and the American Society of Agronomy (ASA) have invited the public to continue to celebrate World Soil Day on December 5 on an ongoing basis.

The Food and Agriculture Organization of the United Nations has implemented the hashtag, #WorldSoilDay, and a campaign "Stop soil erosion, Save our future," with suggestions for activities by students, farmers, teachers, NGOs and private sector organizations.

A map of International World Soil Day events is available online, as well as a list of yearly World Soil Day campaigns, a poster with World Soil Day Activities from the FAO, educational materials, and a downloadable coloring book for children.

The University of Michigan Museum of Natural History celebrated World Soil Day 2019 with hands-on activities, and a panel discussion by soil scientists and local farmers.

TreeHugger commemorated World Soil Day 2019 with a feature article explaining how soil is "the foundation of ... of green building, the plants that make the materials ... to minimize our upfront carbon emissions." Members of the public are urged to commemorate the day with efforts to reduce food waste, eat a diverse diet, compost, read labels on lawn and garden products, and perform soil tests.

== International Year of Soils, 2015 ==
The Global Soil Partnership planned a website, logo and activities for The International Year of Soil, and agricultural and environmental organizations around the world held local events to contribute to the special year.

The United States Department of Agriculture held a kick-off event. Its National Resources Conservation Service commemorated the event with monthly themes.

OpenLearn Open University featured its courses on soil.

Kansas State University hosted an event in Manhattan, Kansas to celebrate the International Year of Soils, and kick off the 12th International Phytotechnologies Conference.

Vivekananda College hosted a two-day Vivekananda Science Exhibition to Rural Masses (VISETORM-VIII) for rural schoolchildren.

The 2015 Ethiopia Society of Soils Science (ESSS) Conference chose the theme of "International Year of Soils: Ethiopia Experience". Representatives from the Ethiopian Ministry of Agriculture and Natural Resources, the Food and Agriculture Organization of the United Nations, and the Ethiopian Society of Soil Science celebrated World Soil Day at the end of conference.

Other events included Sundays with Science lectures at the San Francisco Public Library and University of Nebraska State Museum, exhibits, events for teachers, and a Microbes Are Us Costume Parade by Hawaiian schoolchildren.

The FAO website summarized what individuals could take home from the year as:

- A deep and newfound appreciation for our soils,
- A wealth of information material, and
- Friends, partnerships and linkages,
- as well a personal discovery by one of the organizers:

"On a closing note, just the other day a member of the IYS Steering Comittee [sic] told members that he recently found out that soils contain a bacterium called Mycobacterium vaccae, also known as the Golden Bacillus. Apparently, scientists have found that, when ingested or inhaled, this substance reduces anxiety and increases levels of serotonin in the brain, making you happier."

Official closure of the 2015 International Year of Soils (IYS) took place at FAO Headquarters on December 4, 2015.

== International Decade of Soils, 2015–2024 ==
The International Union of Soil Scientists has proclaimed 2015–2024 the International Decade of Soils. This is a continuation of the efforts made during the International Year of the Soils 2015.

== See also ==
- Soil governance
- Soil health
- Soil conservation
- World Soil Museum
