= National Green Week =

William Seach Green Week

National Green Week is a campaign that occurred during the week of February 2–8, 2009 in the United States, to teach school children about recycling, reusing, and reducing waste and other ways to advocate for the environment. “The whole week, we’ll have kids sign a pledge that they will not bring any trash to school — nothing that will go in the trash,” says Leslie Castle, co-founder, along with her sister Victoria Waters, of the Green Education Foundation, the non-profit that is launching National Green Week.

National Green Week was conceived based on the results of the Fisher Green School Experiment, and had a pilot run in December 2008, at Weymouth Seach Elementary School in Weymouth Massachusetts.

In 2009, the Green Education Foundation's goal was to sign up 2000 schools including 1 million students which, according to WCVB TV, would reduce trash going to landfills by 2 million pounds for the very first National Green Week. By the end of the 2009 National Green Week, a total of more than 250,000 children in 500 schools across 44 states participated to reduce waste and promote sustainability.

== National Green Week Pilot Schools ==
=== The Fisher Green School Experiment ===
Students at Fisher Elementary School in Walpole, Massachusetts, conducted a trash experiment. For two weeks they collected and weighed their trash, including juice boxes and snack wrappers. The school collected 450 lbs. of trash a day. Then they received a "Green Pack", which was itself a reusable shopping bag, and included a water bottle and reusable snack containers. They were able to reduce their trash by 70% using these "Green Packs" Teacher Lisa Grasso's third grade class in particular recorded less than an ounce of trash in 2 weeks.

=== The William Seach Green Week ===
Like the students at Fisher Elementary, students at William Seach Elementary in Weymouth, Massachusetts, weighed their trash. The school of 370 students collected 25 lbs. of trash a day. After receiving green packs, they reduced their trash by 86% to 3.4 lbs. of trash a day. Town employees were also encouraged to reduce waste by Weymouth Mayor Sue Kay. "That brings the parents into it. They kind of get into it with creating the lunches. And if we show our employees that the children are participating, then why can't we do it also?"
