= World Soil Museum =

Museum in Wageningen, Netherlands

Coordinates: 51.987469°N 5.666406°E

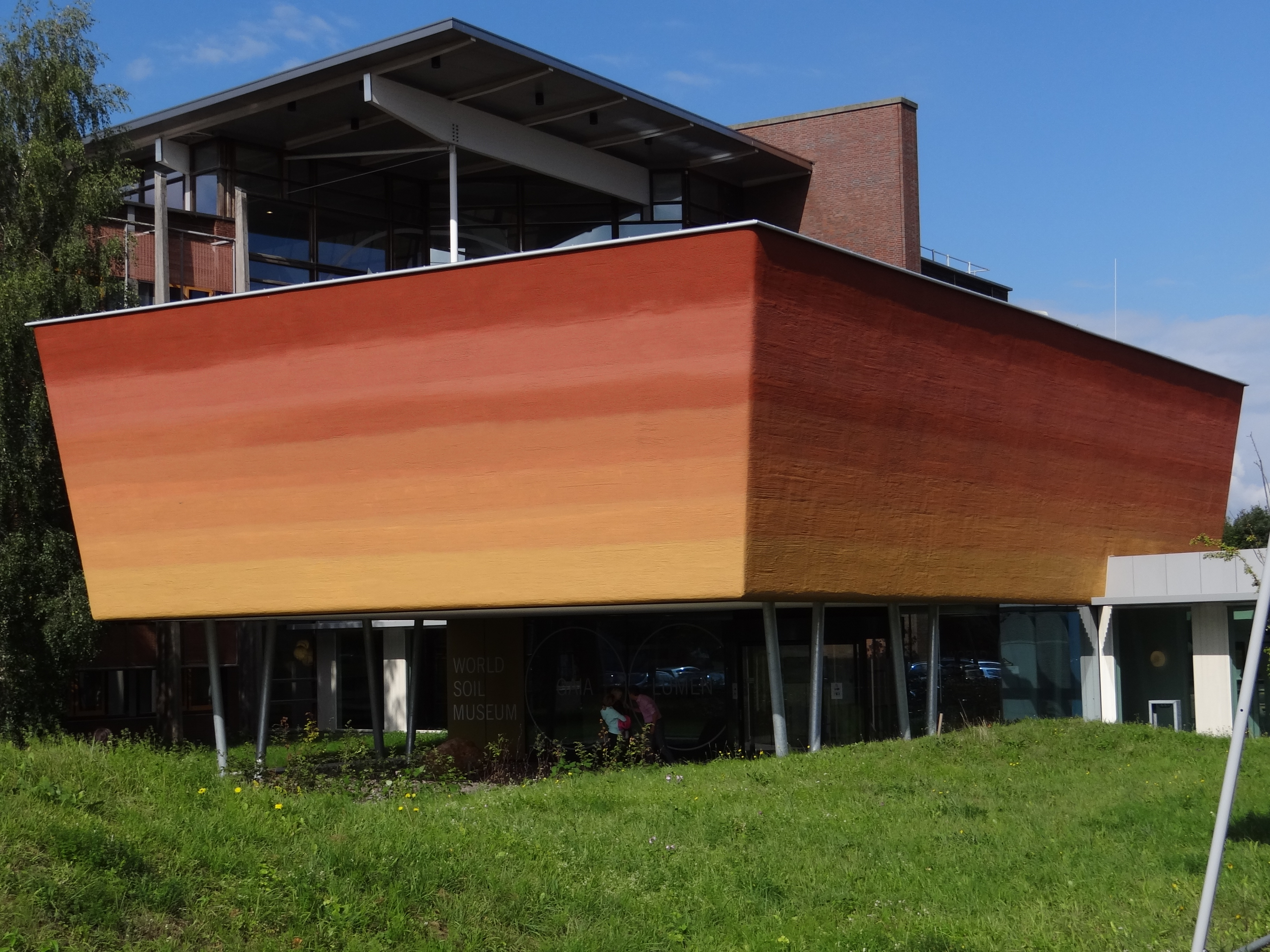
World Soil Museum, ISRIC - World Soil Information, Wageningen campus, The Netherlands.

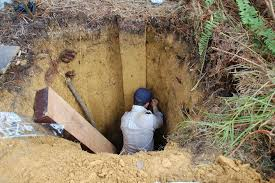
Excavating a soil monolith (Kalimantan, Indonesia)

The World Soil Museum (WSM) displays physical examples of soil profiles (monoliths) representing major soil types of the world, from the volcanic ash soils from Indonesia to the red, strongly weathered soils from the Amazon region. The museum is managed by the International Soil Reference and Information Centre (ISRIC), an independent, science-based foundation. Physically, the museum is located on the campus of Wageningen University and Research Centre in Wageningen, the Netherlands.

The WSM (originally known as International Soil Museum) was created in 1996 at the request of UNESCO and the International Society of Soil Science, with a view to underpin the development of the FAO-UNESCO 'Soil Map of the World' FAO soil classification. The initial ISM building was located at the University of Utrecht.

Some 80 soil monoliths are on display in the WSM, with a much larger collection (some 1000 from over 70 countries) stored and maintained in the repository. For each soil monolith, there is supplemental information about the site of sampling (e.g. landscape, land use, parent material and climate), a detailed profile description for each soil horizon or layer, and data on chemical compositions and physical features. The museum displays examples of the main (32) WRB Soil Reference Groups of the World. A special section is devoted to the major soil types of Netherlands. Further, it showcases soils that have changed significantly under the influence of long-term human activity. Much of this information can also be viewed online . The WSM plays an important role in ISRIC's educational and outreach programme, and is a founding member of the Global Soil Museum network.

Recent developments at ISRIC, which also hosts the ISC World Data Centre for Soils (WDC-Soils), are succinctly described in a series of Annual Reports. Key data holdings include a large set of quality assessed and standardised soil profile data for the world (WoSIS) and a collection of soil property maps for the world (SoilGrids) derived using digital soil mapping based on WoSIS and a large selection of environmental covariates for the globe.
