= International Sloth Day =

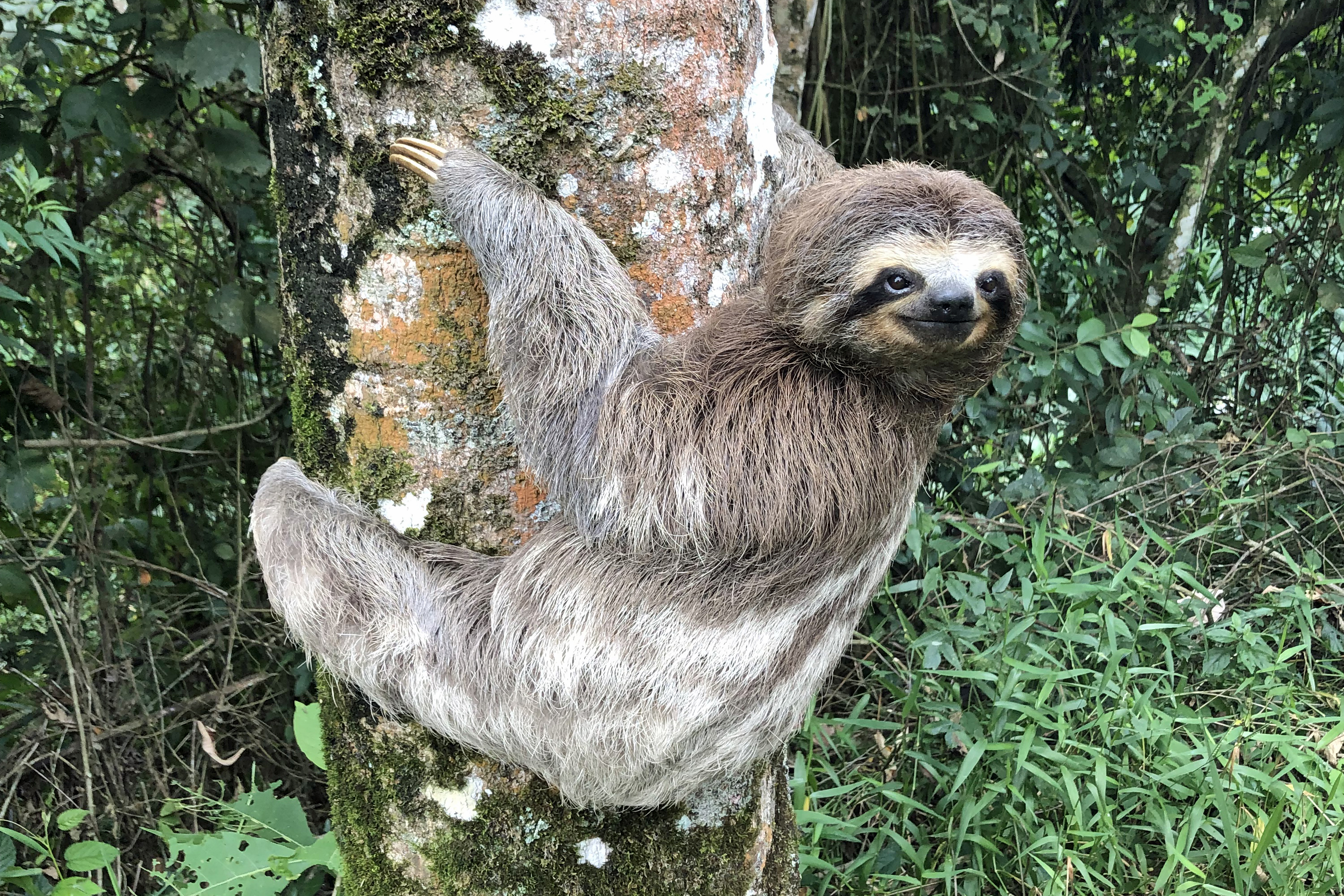
- Date: 20 October
- Next time: 20 October 2026
- Frequency: Annual

International Sloth Day is observed on 20 October and is associated with raising awareness about sloths and their conservation. The observance promotes awareness of sloths, their ecological roles and the conservation challenges they face. Sloths are native to Central and South America, where they depend on tropical forest habitats. Habitat loss and fragmentation, road traffic, wildlife trafficking and the use of sloths in some tourist attractions pose threats to their welfare and survival.

== History ==
International Sloth Day was established by the Colombian wildlife conservation organisation AIUNAU in 2010, following the first International Meeting on the Wellbeing and Conservation of Sloths, held in Medellín, Colombia, in November of that year.

== Observance ==
International Sloth Day is marked through educational activities, conservation campaigns, public outreach and online events. Wildlife organisations use the occasion to share information about sloth behaviour, habitat protection and responsible wildlife tourism.
