= World Fish Migration Day =

World Fish Migration Foundation
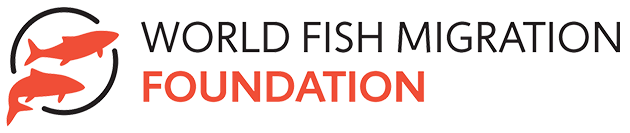
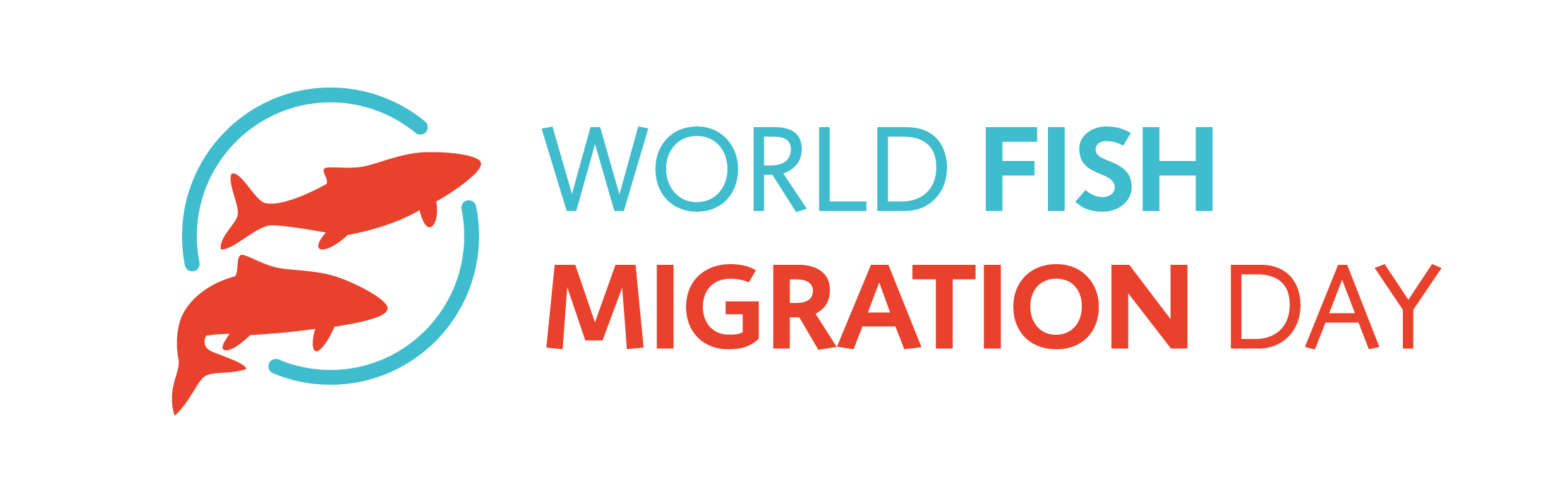
- WFMD
- Founded: 2014
- Founder: Herman Wanningen
- Type: Non-profit organization
- Purpose: River and fish migration conservation
- Location: Groningen, Netherlands
- Region served: Worldwide
- Methods: Awareness campaigns, partnerships, events
- Website: worldfishmigrationfoundation.com

World Fish Migration Day (WFMD) is a global event celebrated every two years to raise global attention to the need for restored river connections for migrating fish. Restored river connectivity allows the achievement of healthier fish stocks and more productive rivers. The 6th World Fish Migration Day was celebrated on May 25, 2024, under the theme “Free Flow”.

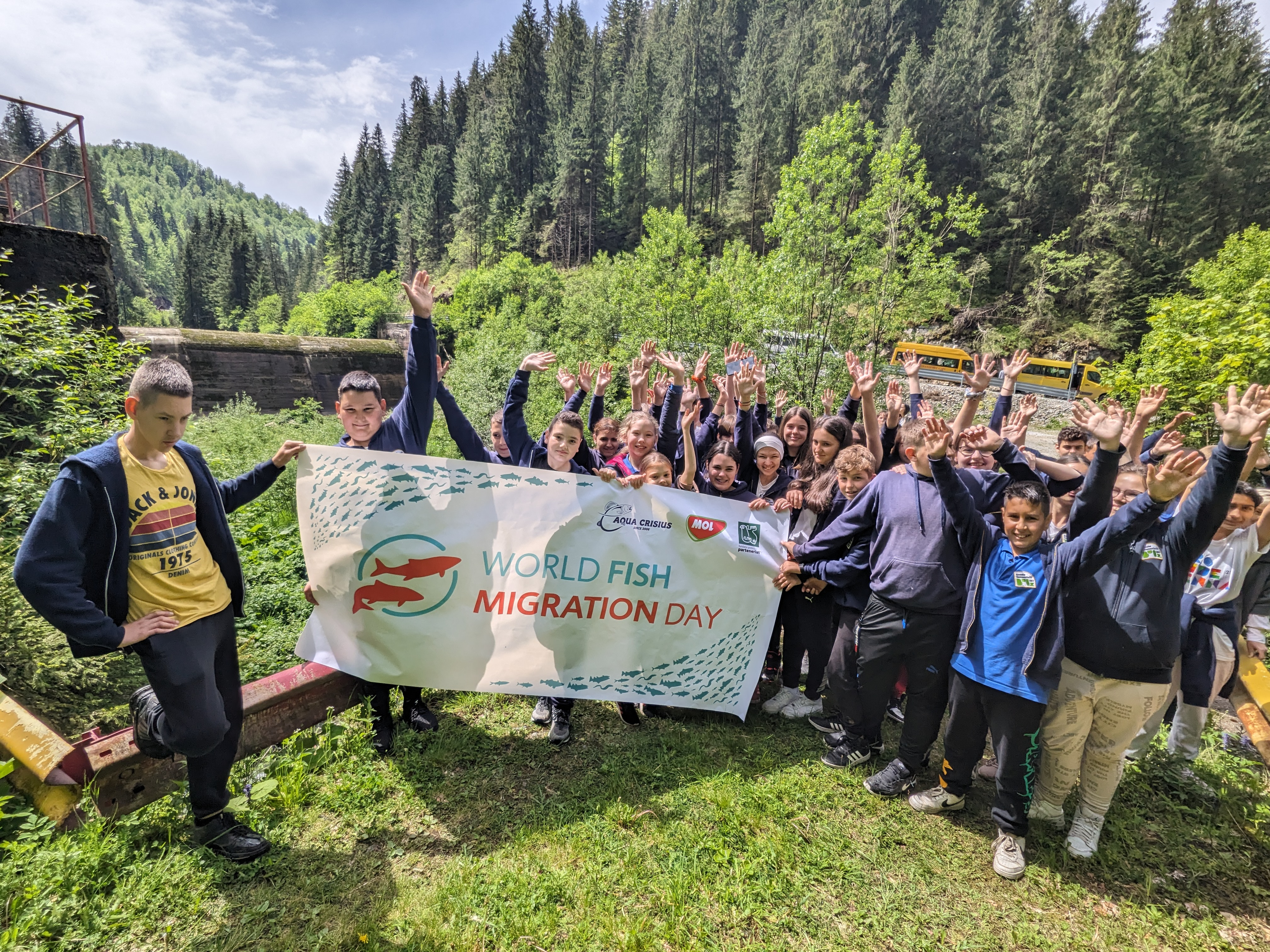
WFMD2024 © Aqua Crisius Anglers Association / Andrei Togor

== History ==
The concept of a day to celebrate fish migration was shown to be a success within the North Sea Region on May 14, 2011. In 2011, partners of the Living North Sea Project, funded by the European Union, participated to raise awareness about fish passage issues in the North Sea Region, including 25 locations in seven countries. The day created publicity in both regional and national press, including social media, magazines, radio and TV stations (From Sea to Source).

After the success in 2011, a Dutch conservationist Herman Wanningen from the World Fish Migration Foundation, reached out to various organizations worldwide, including The Nature Conservancy, WWF, and the Freshwater Fish Specialist Group of the International Union for Conservation of Nature (FFSG-IUCN) to create a global celebratory day, which is today known as the World Fish Migration Day. In 2014 the first ever WFMD took place and is now generally planned for every second year in spring, under the coordination of the World Fish Migration Foundation.

== Description ==
WFMD is a one-day event to create worldwide awareness of the importance of freshwater migratory fish and open rivers for the general public, especially students and their teachers, resource managers and engineers, and commercial and recreational anglers, as well as those individuals who influence public policy that affect rivers. It is a global initiative with activities organized to reach these audiences.

Around the world, coordination and promotion is done through local activities supported and coordinated by a central office of the World Fish Migration Platform. The website is being developed and ambassadors are arising for national and continental satellite offices. At the individual event level, organizations undertake the development of an activity to raise awareness and involve local people and media about fish migration and open rivers.

Local events include a range of activities: field trips, events at a school or aquaria, the opening of a fishways, races, food festivals, etc. At this local level, the logo and central message of the WFMD, connecting fish, rivers and people, is used to connect sites around the world. The day starts in New Zealand and will follows the sun around the world, ending in Hawaii.

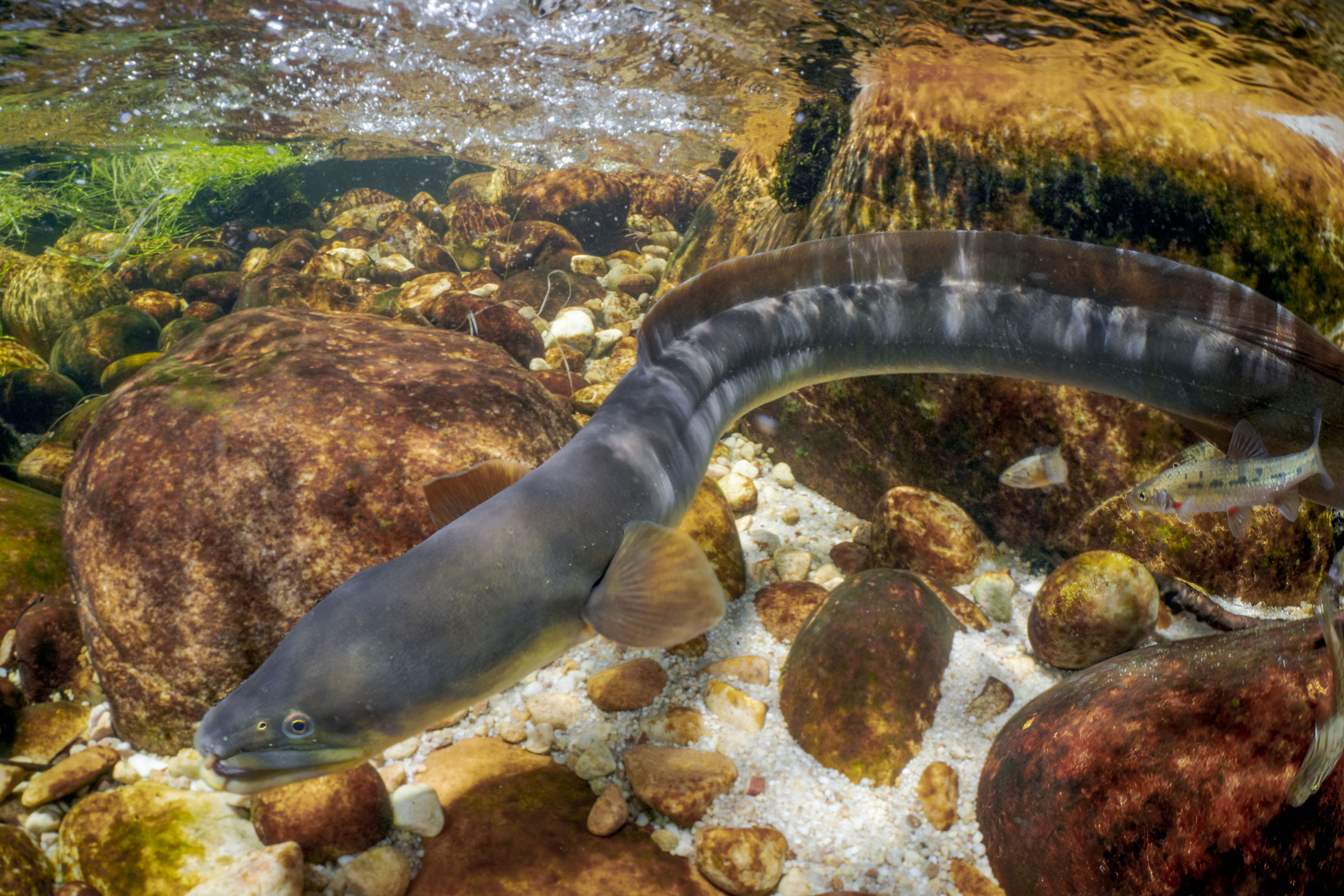
Eel in South Africa© Jeremy Shelton

== Migratory Fish ==
A fish species is migratory if individuals or groups of that species move to exploit resources that vary in space or time such as habitat or food. Thousands of migratory fish species that connect land and water around the globe. Gobies (Sicydiinae subfamily) are located in the South Pacific and Tropics, like those pictured bottom right, migrate from sea and climb up waterfalls to access pools where they grow and spawn, while salmon in North America feed bear and deliver nutrients to streams and land on their migration.

== Free-flowing rivers ==
Rivers that flow freer of human alterations support greater movement and exchange of water, species, sediments, nutrients, and energy. In 2024, World Fish Migration Day celebrates existing and renewed free-flowing rivers.

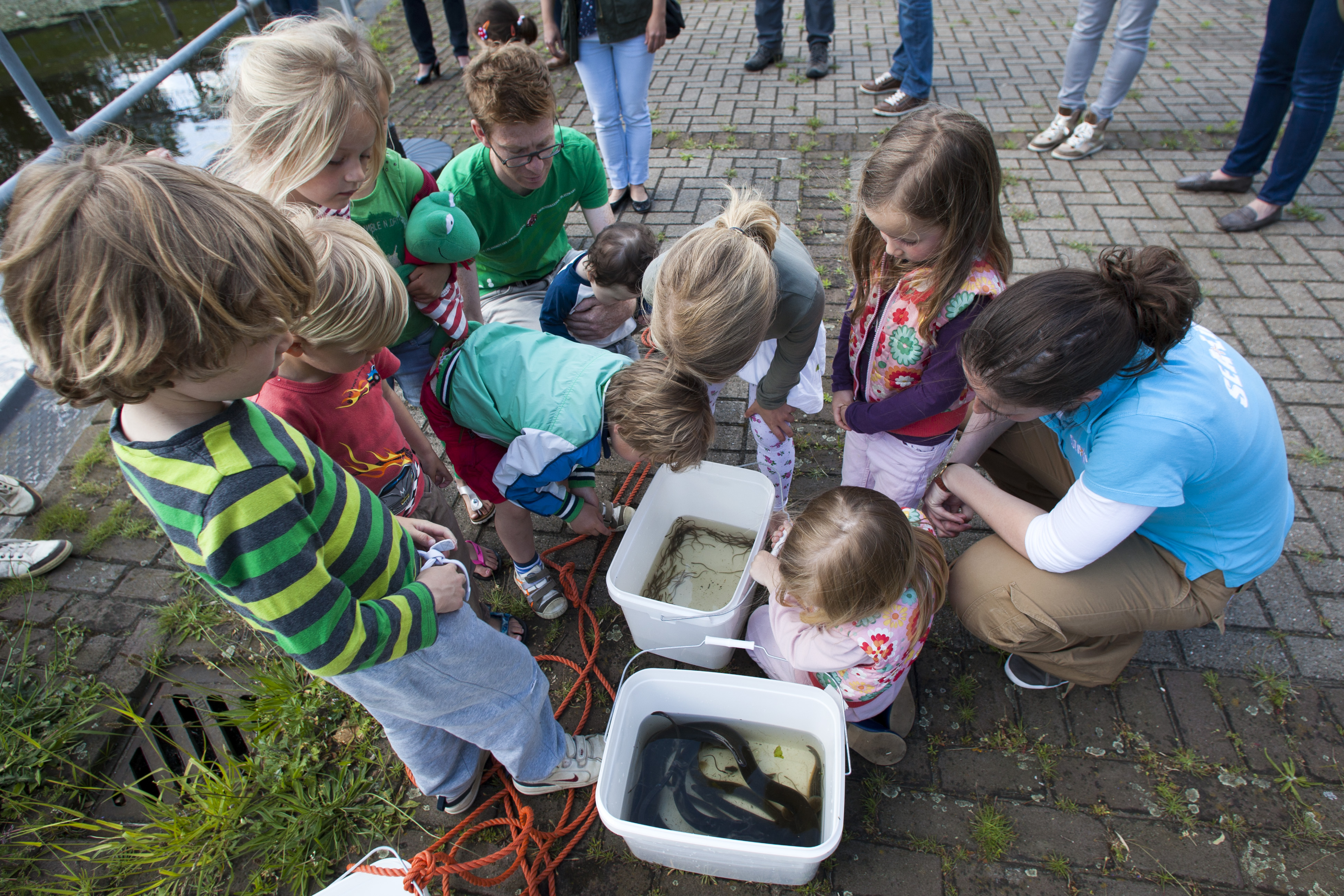
WFMD2014, The Netherlands © Joris van Kessel, Hoogheemraadschap Rijnland

== WFMD 2014 ==
May 24, 2014, marked the first ever World Fish Migration Day (WFMD), a worldwide celebration of healthy rivers and free-running fish with over 270 events. On this day, over 1000 different organisations contributed to WFMD2014, through support and/or participation, in 53 countries worldwide. It was estimated that over 50,000 people participated in events around the world.

The events ranged from fun-filled river clean-ups in Poland to successful conferences in Spain, as well as, marches in Ethiopia and open days for discovering migratory fish species in Greece and New Zealand. There was a large amount of publicity that was created through social media, TV stations such as BBC,[6] National Geographic magazines and articles,[7] local and regional press and radio shows.[8][9]

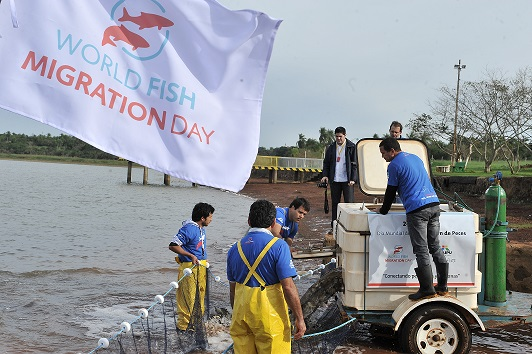
WFMD2014 Paraguay © Itaipu Binacional

== WFMD 2016 ==
WFMD 2016 was held on May 21, 2016. The 2nd WFMD had 450 events in 63 countries. The WFMD communication campaign was developed under the slogan Fish can't travel like we can to highlight that fish are restricted to in-water movements that demand connectivity. Results from social media, newspaper, TV and internet analysis show that WFMD 2016 had a global reach of over 70 million people.

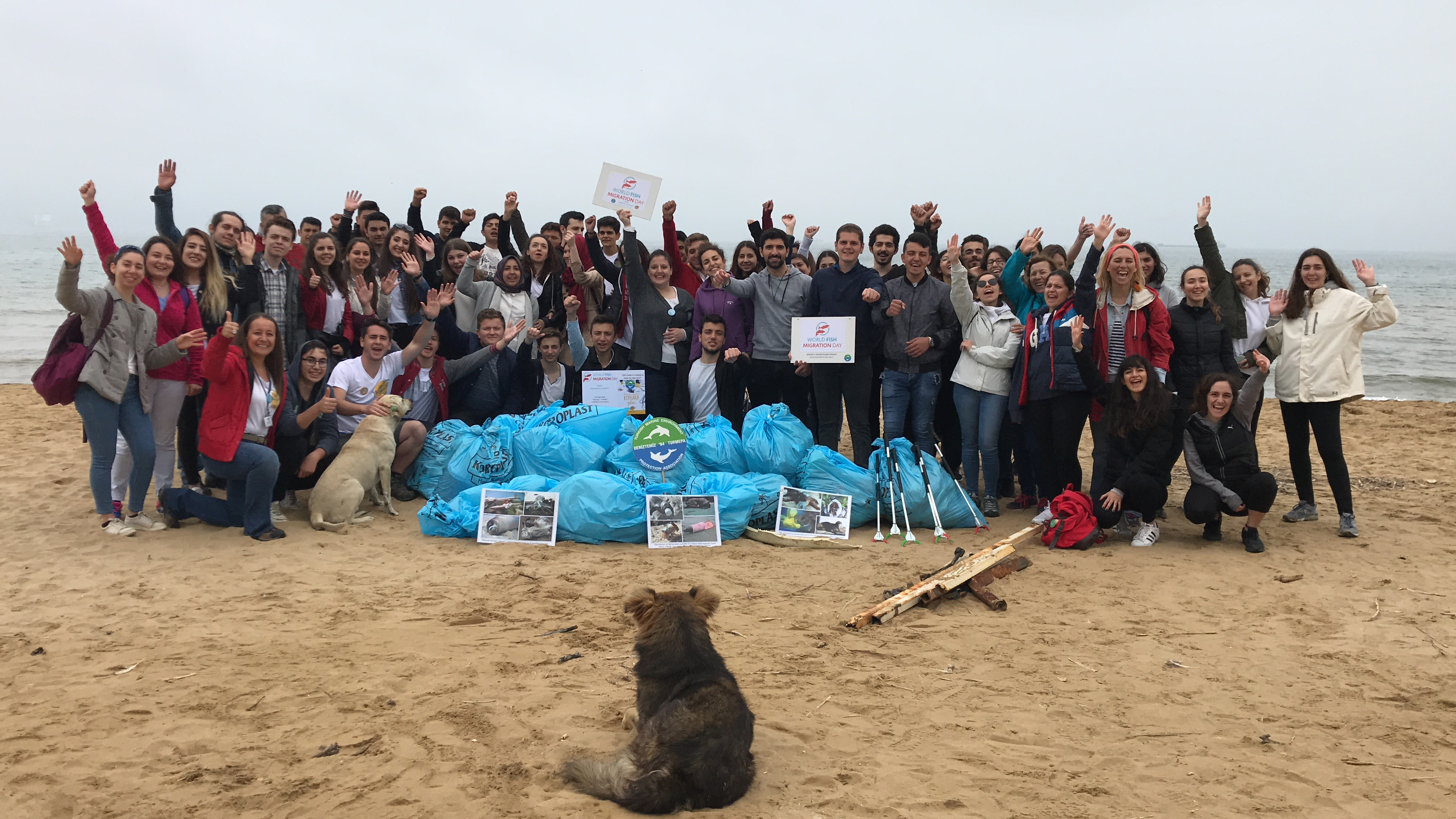
WFMD2018_Turkey © Serap Mutlu Durak

== WFMD 2018 ==
The third World Fish Migration Day took place on April 21, 2018. Over 3000 organizations participated culminating in 573 events in 63 countries. It is estimated that over 200,000 people joined local events—the most participation yet. Highlights included the release of the new From Sea to Source 2.0 guidance book. This book was written by a team of international experts who impart their knowledge of river restoration activities and important migratory fish species. The events included a South America Headquarters event in Bolivia where museum exhibitions, a native fish cooking festival, and artisanal markets were held as well as a fish art contest in Gabon.

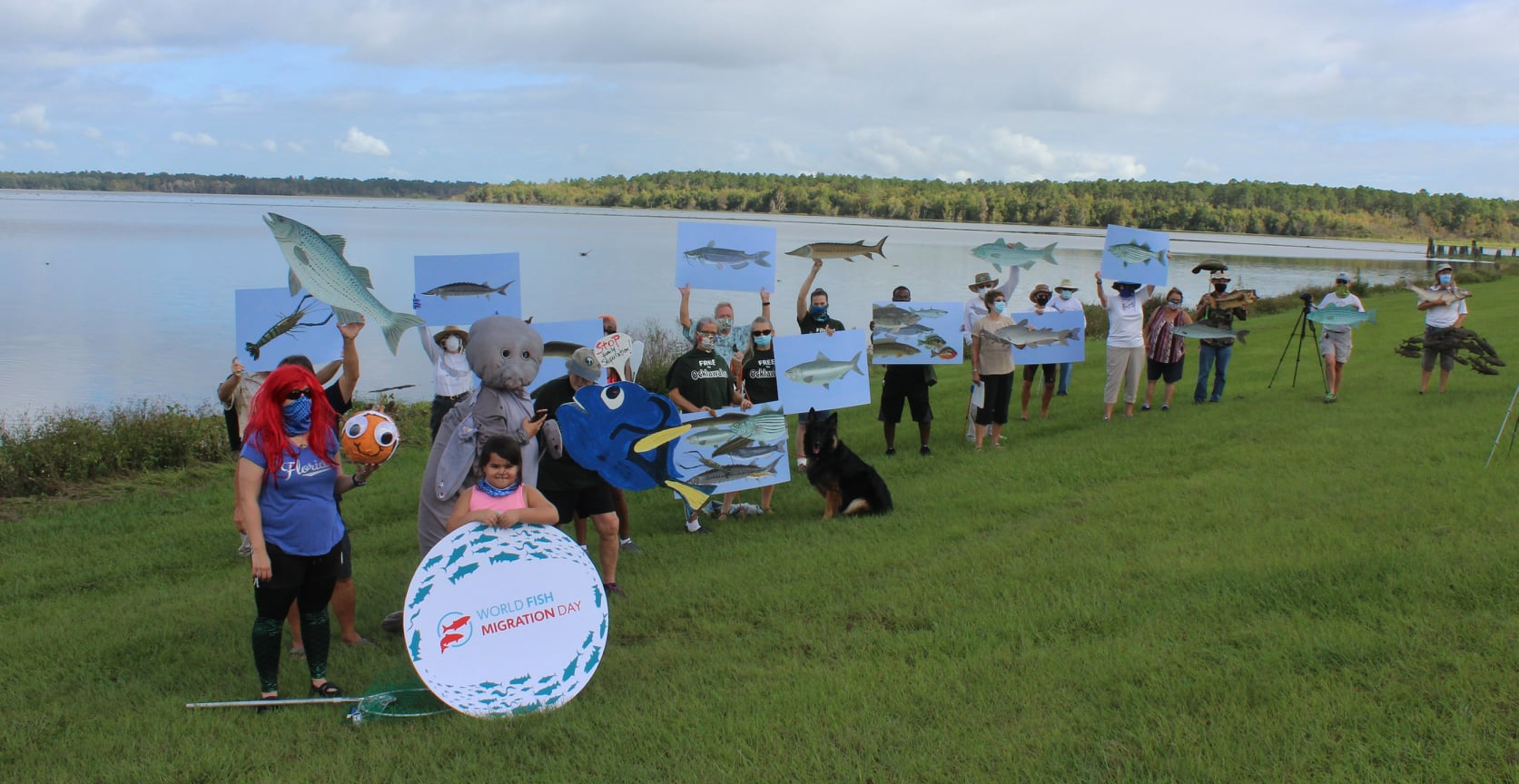
WFMD2020_USA ©Florida Defenders of the Environment

== WFMD 2020 ==
Despite COVID-19, thousands of people celebrated World Fish Migration Day to stress the urgency of restoring declining migratory fish populations. On October 24, 2020, 361 in 71 different countries joined to celebrate the #LoveFlows and raise awareness for fish and rivers. Notable highlights events hosted by the WFMF include a 24h-webinar marathon, from Hawaii to New Zealand, and the heart-warming Eurofishion song contest, demonstrating global love for fish and rivers through the power of music and enthusiasm.

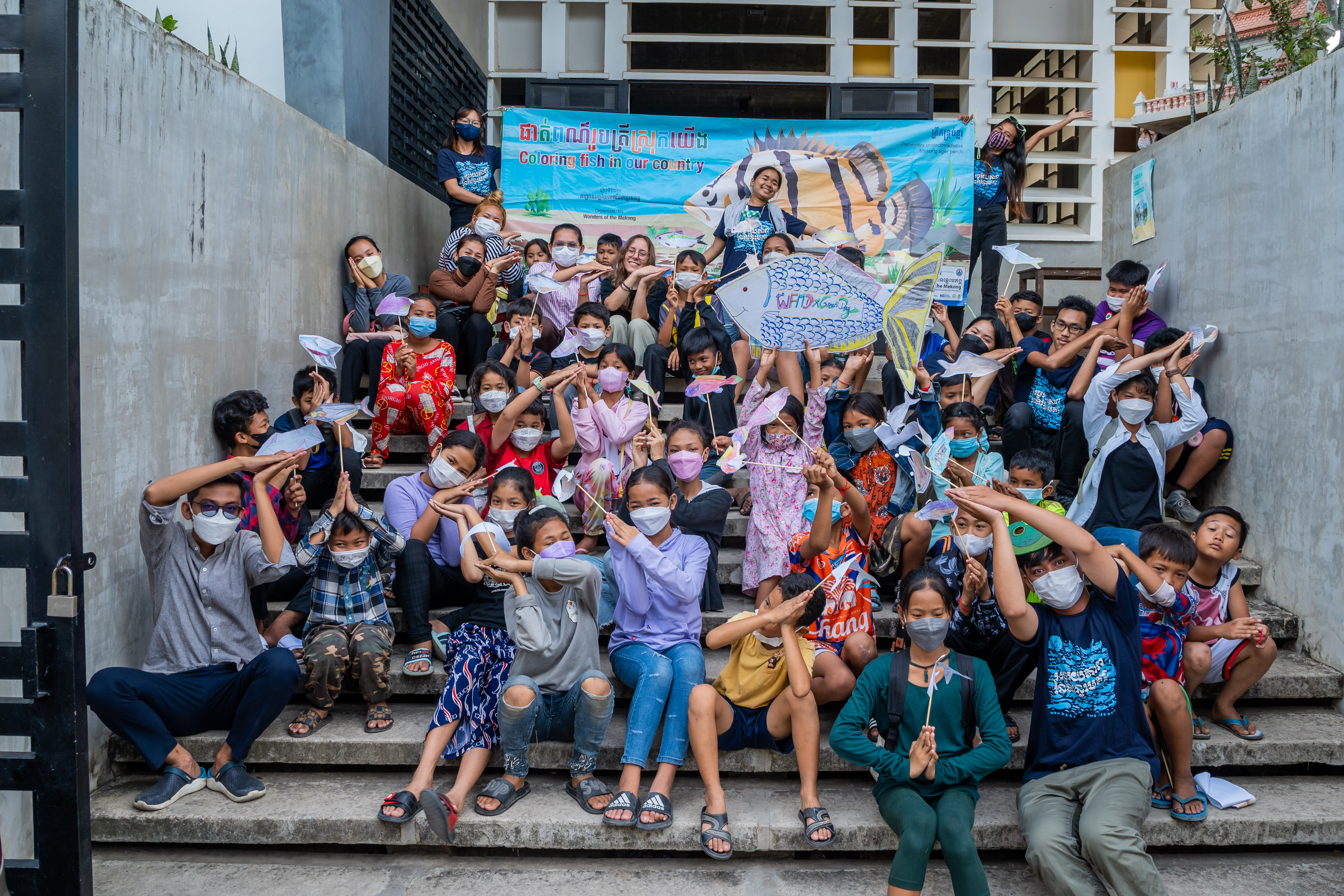
WFMD2022_Cambodia ©Vireakboth-Young Eco Ambassador

== WFMD 2022 ==
In 2022, WFMD took place on May 21, under the inspiring theme "BREAK FREE". A record number of 78 countries organized 473 events, reaching nearly 200 million people through social media posts with the hashtag #WorldFishMigrationDay. The Fish Flags art contest played an important role, as did the celebration of the opening of more than 1,000 km of rivers. The inaugural Dam Removal Award was an event that recognized the top dam removal project of the year. WFMD helped to showcase the work that different organizations around the world are making for migratory fishes and rivers.

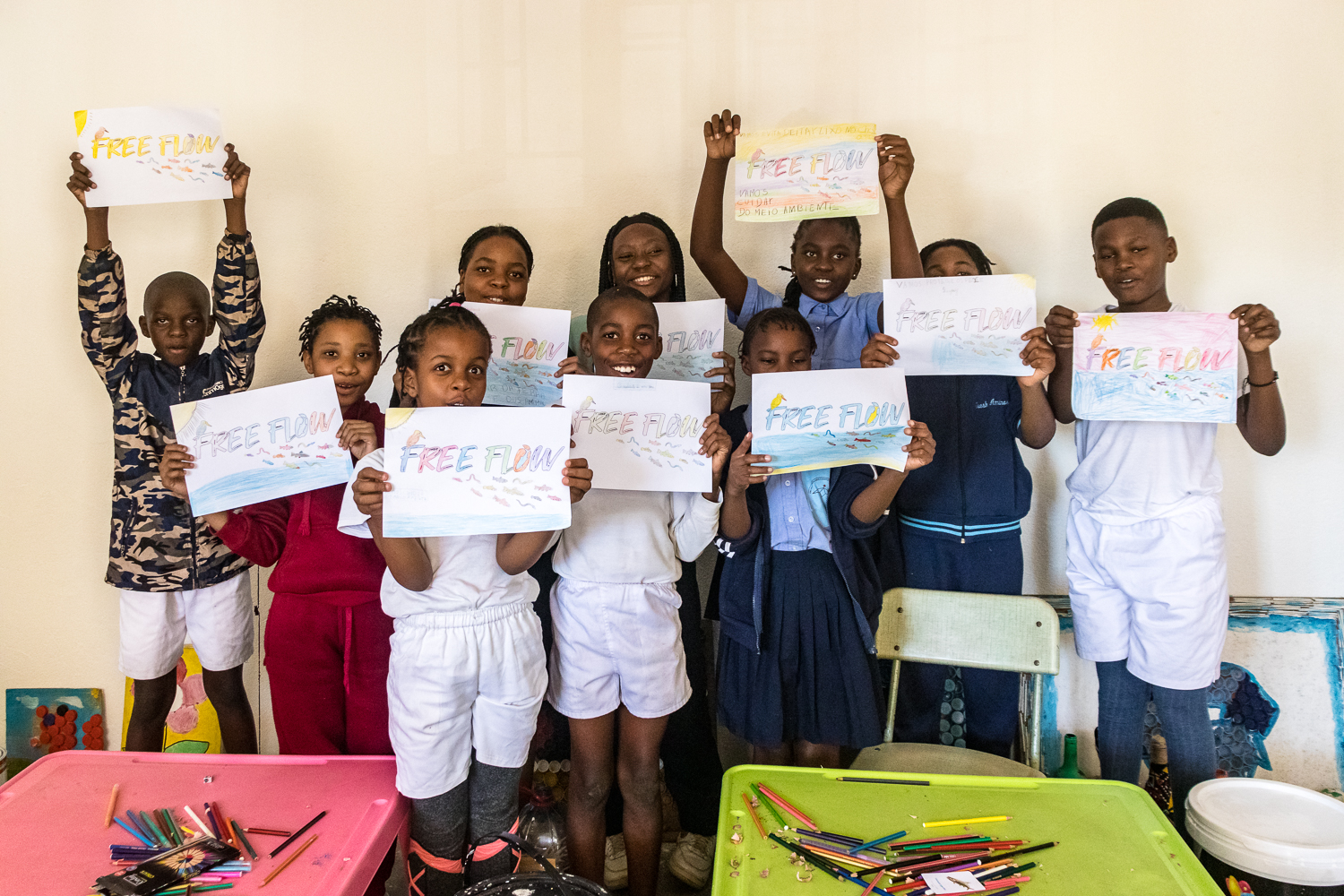
WFMD2024, REPENSAR, Mozambique © Bruno Fernandes Gomes

== WFMD 2024 ==
On 25 May 2024, WFMD celebrated the existing and renewed free-flowing rivers under the theme ‘Free Flow’. Across 77 countries, 312 events highlighted the importance of rivers running free of obstacles attracting over 45,000 participants and engaging a million people[14]. Published ahead of WFMD, the new Living Planet Index, revealing an alarming 81% decline in monitored freshwater migratory fish populations, widely featured in over 40 journal articles.

Initiatives like the Happy Fish Athlete Challenge encouraged participants to cover distances mirroring those of migratory fish, while the Happy Fish Trivia engaged people in discovering fascinating facts about these species and the free-flowing rivers they migrate on. The WFMD Art Contest saw over 500 entries from students aged 4-18 across six countries, with nine winners selected.
