= Green Office Week =

British annual environmental awareness week

Green Office Week (now Green Month) is a British annual awareness week that encourages workers across the UK to make small changes to their working habits to positively impact the environment. The week raises awareness of key green issues, providing office workers with the practical advice, tools and help they need to create a more sustainable way of working. The week is held during the second week of May each year. It is run by the Avery labelling company.

The week has activities designed to promote the idea of greener working practices. These have included Q&A seminars and interactive digital tools.

== History ==
The first Green Office Week was launched in 2009. This was in response to research showing that UK employees felt they were being held back from being environmentally friendly at work because of a lack of empowerment and facilities. The week set out to ‘champion change’ by raising awareness of the issues workers identified as holding them back from environmentally friendly working.

Since 2009, the week has been held on an annual basis, with organisations, businesses and local councils using the week as a platform to encourage behaviour change.

== What happens during Green Office Week ==
During the week, there is a different focus each day:

- Focus on Energy (Monday) looks at practical ways to reduce energy consumption.
- Focus on Transport (Tuesday) considers how workers can reduce their environmental impact through better transportation.
- Focus on Waste (Wednesday) encourages workers to think about the three Rs: Reduce, Re-use, Recycle.
- Focus on Purchasing (Thursday) examines the importance of purchasing chains and promotes the use of environmentally friendly products.
- Focus on Innovation (Friday) encourages workers to share their own ideas for developing more sustainable working practices.

== Green Offices for Dummies ==
As part of Green Office Week, a specially commissioned guide was produced in partnership with the worldwide reference series For Dummies. Green Offices for Dummies covers a range of practical ways that workers can implement more sustainable working practices. The guide contains a number of case studies that look at the businesses case for becoming environmentally friendlier. The guide was released in 2009.

== Eco-bikes ==
Throughout the week eco-bikes visit cities across the UK. They will be around major transport links including train and tube stations during rush hour and in the city centre at lunchtimes.

Office workers will be able to get a copy of Green Offices for Dummies Guides. The bikes will be in the following cities:-

- London – Monday / Tuesday,
- Birmingham – Wednesday / Thursday,
- Cardiff – Monday / Tuesday,
- Bristol – Wednesday / Thursday,
- Glasgow – Monday / Tuesday,
- Liverpool – Wednesday / Thursday,
- Leeds – Monday / Tuesday,
- Manchester – Wednesday / Thursday.

== Results of the 2010 national survey with YouGov ==
At the start of 2010 Avery conducted a national environment survey with YouGov to find out office workers’ views on helping the environment. These results were published during Green Office Week; the most popular actions during the week were recycling paper and switching off equipment and lights when not in use.

== 2020s ==
In the 2020s, Avery now runs a "Green Month".
