= Mosquito Awareness Week =

International health observance

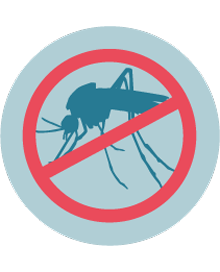
- Official name: Mosquito Awareness Week
- Also called: Mosquito Control Week
- Observed by: United States and others in the American continent
- Type: International
- Date: third week of June
- Duration: 1 week
- Frequency: annual
- First time: 2016
- Started by: Pan American Health Organization
- Related to: Caribbean Mosquito Awareness Week (CARPA), usually in April or May

Mosquito Awareness Week or Mosquito Control Awareness Week is held every year in North and South American countries, including the United States. Mosquito Awareness Week is observed annually in late June. A separate Caribbean Mosquito Awareness Week (CARPA) is held earlier in the year, typically in April or May.

Mosquito Awareness Week raises awareness of diseases spread by mosquitoes, including dengue fever, chikungunya, Zika, yellow fever, and malaria. It aims to reduce mosquito breeding and encourage people to take preventative measures to avoid mosquito bites.

== History ==
Mosquito Awareness Week began in 2016 in response to the 2015 - 2016 Zika outbreak.
