= Zero Waste Week =

Environmental campaign

- Official name: Zero Waste Week
- Observed by: United Kingdom, United States and others
- Type: International
- Date: September 2 to September 6
- Duration: 1 week
- Frequency: Annual
- First time: September 2 to September 6, 2008
- Started by: Rachelle Strauss

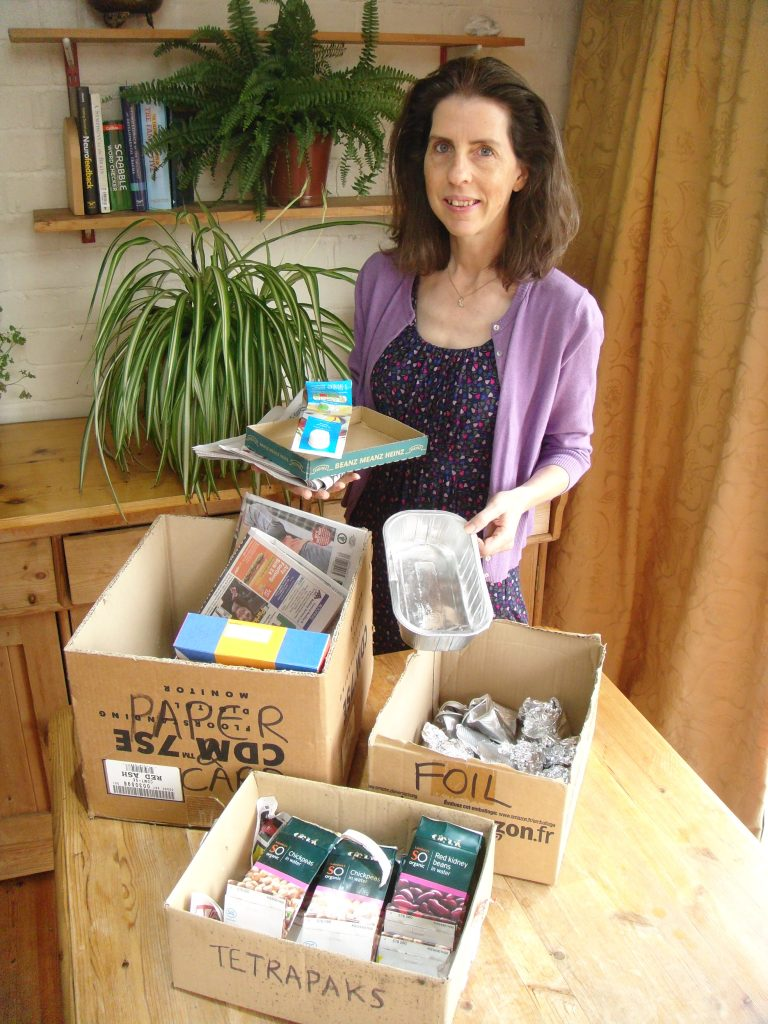
Rachelle Strauss with a box containing some typical items that can be recycled including paper, cardboard, cartons and aluminium.

Zero Waste Week is an environmental campaign to reduce landfill waste, and takes place annually during the first full week in September. It is a non-commercial grass-roots campaign to demonstrate means and methods to reduce waste, foster community support and bring awareness to the increasing problem of environmental waste and pollution.

== Aims ==
The aim of Zero Waste Week is reduce landfill waste, increase recycling and encourage people to participate in the circular economy. A Zero Waste Week campaign runs predominantly on social media and the internet and aim to reach people who want to reduce their household or business waste, reuse or recycle materials.

Zero Waste week actively encourages people to reduce the use of synthetic materials and plastic packaging, and promotes plastic reuse and conscientious recycling to reduce the amount of waste sent to landfill or for incineration. Zero Waste week adopts the adage there’s no such place as away meaning when we throw something away, it goes somewhere else, often causing harm or toxicity to the eco-system. The campaign's main directive is to bring awareness to people that we are all individually and collectively responsible for what we consume and that the short time of usefulness is only a small part of the overall lifecycle of any product.

Zero Waste Week's long term goals are to create long term change in people's habits, including generating more demand for sustainable products, to lobby producers, and governmental decision makers, and to bring awareness for the need of good custodianship to the upcoming generation.

== Events ==
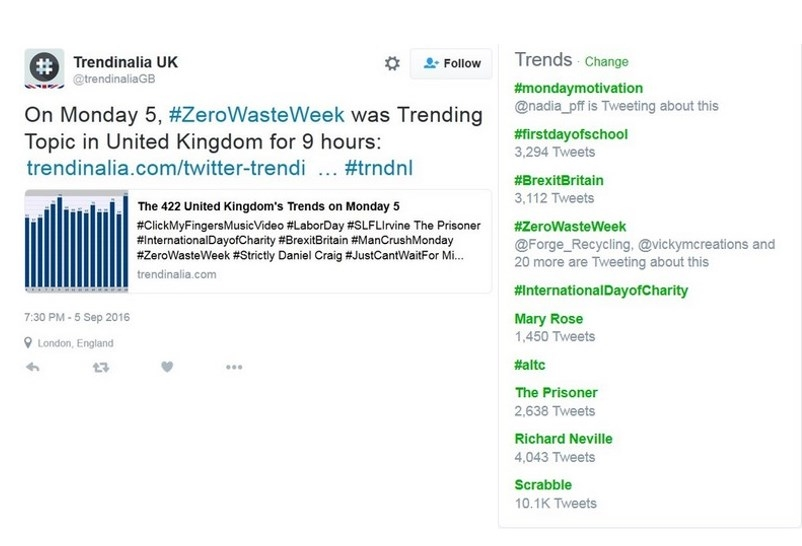
Screenshot taken from Twitter, September 5, 2016 showing that the #ZeroWasteWeek trended in the UK for nine hours

An online campaign runs during Zero Waste Week, and events organized by different groups take place in London, Scotland, New York, Hong Kong, and others. Local and national events are held annually where participants and communities make a concerted effort to demonstrate that household, business and industrial waste can be eliminated or reduced.

== Challenges ==
During Zero Waste Week people are challenged to meet different goals, for example repairing clothes or sewing to combat disposable fashion, or to reduce their weekly waste so that it can fit in a jam jar.

== History ==
Zero Waste week was founded by Rachelle Strauss in 2008 and began as a national campaign in the United Kingdom. The term Zero Waste Week is now used by many organisations, groups and individuals not connected to the original campaign. Strauss first became interested in zero waste after being affected by the Boscastle flood of 2004, a freak weather event that event that she saw as the result of manmade climate change. In September 2008 Strauss launched the first Zero Waste Week with an internet campaign from her blog, to persuade people to reduce, reuse and recycle waste. In September 2013 a new website was set up for Zero Waste Week, and by 2017 people from seventy-three countries had taken part. In 2018 Zero Waste Week reached its ten year milestone. Many countries run their own Zero Waste Week campaign in co-ordination with the original Zero Waste week or independently.

== Awards and recognition ==
In 2015 the UK's parliament passed an early day motion to celebrate Zero Waste Week. Founder Rachelle Strauss received the Points Of Light award in September 2018 from the UK government for her work on Zero Waste Week.

== Society and culture ==
Zero Waste Week was described in the National Geographic Documentary Naked Science Series: 'Surviving Nature's Fury' 2005 and in the film Trashed.

== Other campaigns for Zero Waste Week ==
The term Zero Waste Week has been gradually adopted by other campaigns and organisations to run a week of events and activities, often with focus on specific current sustainability issues.

=== National Marine Sanctuaries ===
Students for Zero Waste Week is a school-driven, week-long campaign to reduce waste on school campuses and within local communities and started in the year 2015/2016.

=== Harvard University ===
During Earth Week 2014, Harvard University's Gutman Café held a zero waste week during which it tried to divert as much of its trash as possible from the landfill.

=== Hong Kong Cleanup ===
Hong Kong Cleanup, a week long campaign of public awareness and on-ground activities.

=== The Island's Sounder ===
Orcas Christian School in Eastsound, Washington held Zero Waste Week during the first week of April 2018 with a focus was on sustainability and re-usability.

=== Emory University ===
Emory University OSI/RHA Zero Waste Week raises awareness and support for sustainable practices on campus. Students interested in reducing their waste signed up to participate received email reminders and tips about living waste-free. In 2016, Emory University adopted its Sustainability Vision and Strategic Plan, which set campus and community sustainability goals through 2025.
