= Conservation Week =

Annual event in New Zealand

Conservation Week (Kia Mahia Te Mahi) is an annual event in New Zealand to promote conservation of native plants and animals.

The 2020 dates were August 15–23 and the theme was "Nature Through New Eyes". The 2021 dates were September 4–12. In 2023, the theme of the week was "asking Aotearoa to take action for nature".

== See also ==
- Conservation in New Zealand
