= Spring equinox in Teotihuacán =

Annual event in Teotihuacán, Mexico

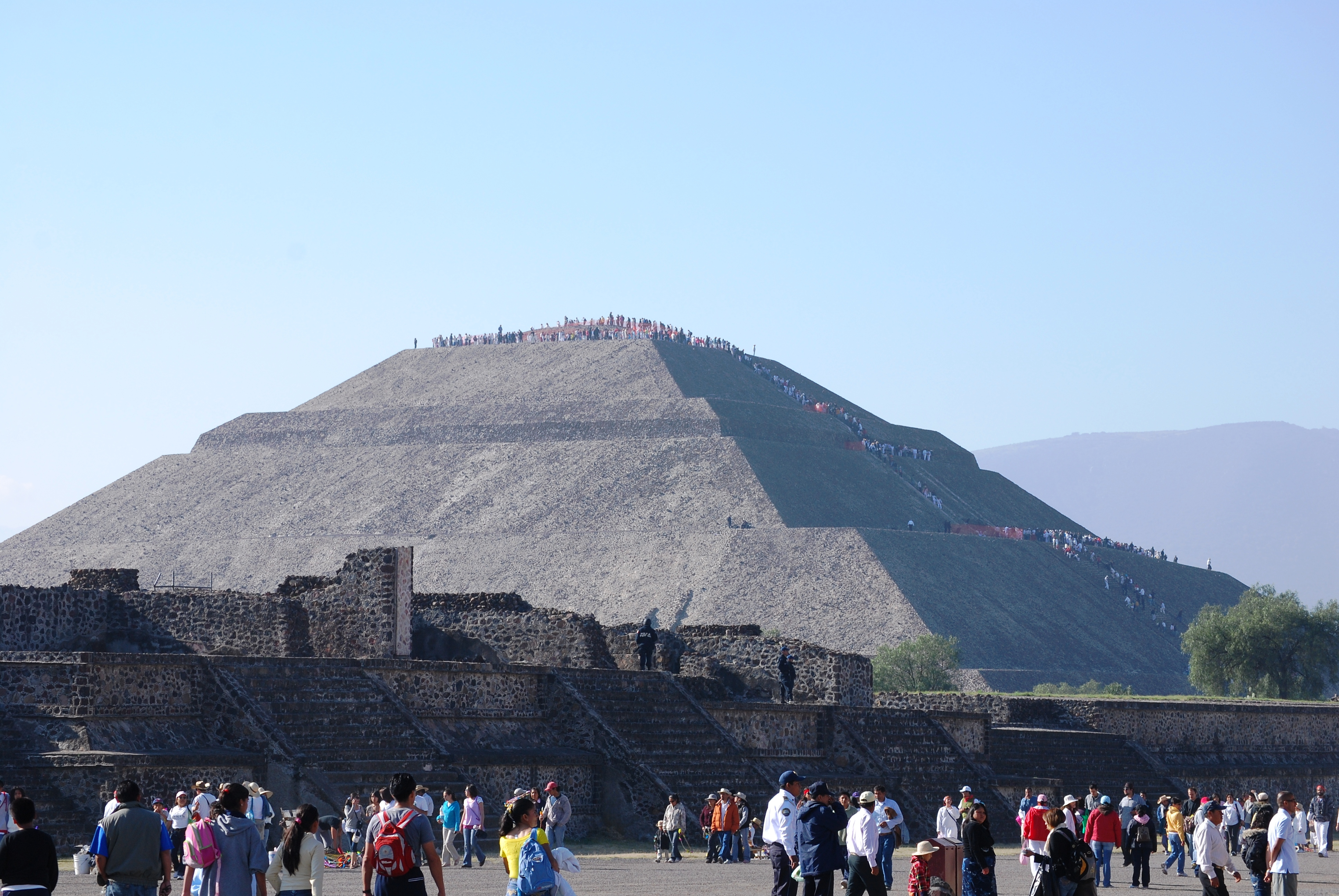
People ascending the Pyramid of the Sun during spring equinox 2010

Spring equinox in Teotihuacán is an annual event which takes place around the 20th and 21st of March at the pre-Hispanic site of Teotihuacán, Mexico. This event is mirrored by other similar events in other pre-Hispanic sites such as Chichén Itzá and Malinalco, Mexico State.

== Observances ==
In Teotihuacan, thousands of people visit for the event, many dressed in white with a red scarf or other accessory. Many dance, burn incense and chant but the defining ritual is to stand at the top of the Pyramid of the Sun, with arms outstretched facing the sun in the morning on the eastern horizon. Most climb this pyramid between 9am and 1pm. However, those who arrive early enough can see the sun rise over the Apan Mountains to the east of the Pyramid of the Sun, with its red rays coloring the landscape and the onlookers’ clothing. Chanting and other clamor accompanies this sunrise as participants stand with arms outstretched.

Some come because they believe they are following in the footsteps of their ancestors, in asking the gods for energy and health on this day. Some New Age sources claim that at the point of the equinox, man is at a unique place in the cosmos, when portals of energy open. Climbing the 360 stairs to the top of the Pyramid of the Sun is claimed to allow participants to be closer to this "energy".

== Popularity of the event ==
It was estimated about more than a million people visited the site during the weekend on which the Northward equinox fell in 2010. Officially, the equinox occurred on Saturday, but many seemed assured that the energy was still present on Sunday. Due to the large crowds, access and activity at the site is severely restricted. The site is opened for the event from 6 am to 5pm, with visitors on this day entering through gates 1, 2 and 5 and leaving through gate 3. Commercial activity is restricted. Special scaffolding and security are placed on the pyramid on that day to assure a regular flow of people. Only the first level of the Pyramid of the Moon is accessible. Other areas such as the Palace of Quetzalcoatl, the Site Museum, the Citadel and others are all closed off, restricting visitors to the open areas of the Avenue of the Dead and the plazas around the two pyramids. The small mounds that line the Avenue of the Dead are reserved for police monitoring the crowds below. Ceremonies are restricted to the plazas next to the Pyramids of the Sun and Moon and prohibited on them. The normal parking lots of the site are closed on this day with parking restricted to private lots in the communities around the site.

First aid for those who need it, often from the heat later in the day, is provided by the organizations such as the Mexican Red Cross and the state civil protection authority. Around 550 federal police are employed in the archeological zone for the event as well as numerous state and local enforcement for the surrounding communities.

== Archaeoastronomy of the site ==
Although some are now closed off during the spring equinox, a number of the buildings at the Teotihuacan site show relationships with astronomy. Archaeoastronomy research has been undertaken at the site since the 1990s. The Palace of the Butterflies has circles on its walls created with reflective mica, which have been interpreted as representing astronomical bodies. It is very likely that the Palace of Quetzalcoatl functioned as a solar observatory. On the spring equinox, from between 7:15 and 7:45am when the sun rises, a shadow travels upwards along figures etched and painted red onto a battlement-like structure on the west wall. Some of the figures depicted are owls, a bird associated with darkness as well as rays of light. The symbolism is that of balance between light and dark. Birds also symbolize the stars. This structure is called an unxicalcoliuhqui, a type of fretwork that can also been seen at Chichén Itzá. As with the Butterfly Palace, there are circles on the walls created with reflective mica.

The first rays of the sun that stream across the landscape on the day of the spring equinox are broken on their way to Teotihuacan by an elevation called the Cerro Colorado Grande. Some believe that this point was used by the ancient people of Teotihuacan to mark the equinox. However, this would most likely have required the placement of the Pyramid of the Sun in a more northerly position, or that the Pyramid of the Moon played a more prominent role in spring equinox celebrations.

== See also ==
- Angkor Wat Equinox
- Orientation of churches
