= Angkor Wat Equinox =

Astrological phenomenon in Cambodia

Angkor Wat Equinox ព្រឹត្តិការណ៍សមរាត្រី
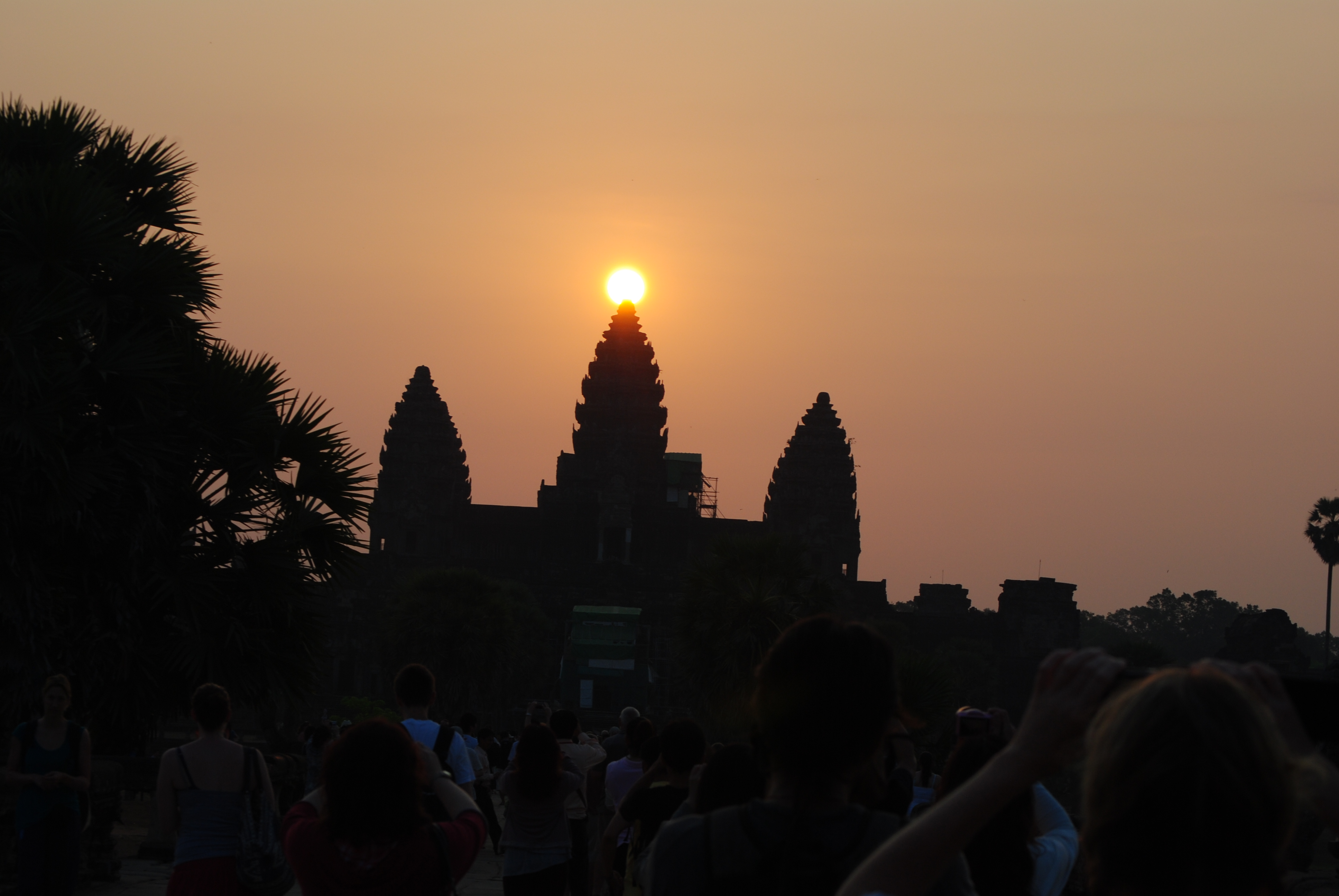
- Equinox at Angkor in 2012
- Genre: Solar phenomena
- Date: Equinox
- Frequency: Bi-annually
- Venue: Angkor Wat
- Location: Siem Reap
- Country: Cambodia

The Angkor Wat equinox is a solar phenomenon considered as a hierophany that happens twice a year with spring and autumn equinox, as part of the many astronomical alignments indicative of a "fairly elaborate system of astronomy" and of the Hindu influence in the construction of the vast temple complex of Angkor Wat, in Cambodia.

== Description ==
The sunrise on Angkor Wat during the equinox is such that someone standing in front of the western entrance on the equinox is able to see the sun rising directly over the central lotus tower. In fact, it would be more correct to describe the phenomenon as the exact match of the shadow formed by the sunrise on Angkor Wat's central prang and the western entrance bridge.

== Architecture ==
Like most celestial cities, Angkor Wat contains many astronomically inspired symbols and alignments. Angkor Wat was built by Suryvarman II, literally the Sun-King, during his reign for 1113 to 1150 with "astronomical and cosmic rhythm". It was dedicated as a tribute to Vishnu, a solar deity according to the Rigveda.

In fact, it appears that most of the vast complex of Angkor Wat was determined by the equinox. In the bas-relief at Angkor Wat, the position of the churning pivot would correspond to the position of the spring equinox. The 91 asuras in the south represent the 91 days from equinox to winter solstice, and the 88 northern devas represent the 88 days from spring equinox to summer solstice. In fact, there are either 88 or 89 devas in the scene, 89 if the deva atop Mount Mandara is counted with the others. There are 88 or 89 days from the spring equinox, counted from the first day of the new year, to the summer solstice.

In fact, the solar alignment is not limited to Angkor Wat, but includes many other temples of the Khmer civilization, as it connects Angkor Wat with other temples on the Ancient Khmer Highway from the West Mebon to the Preah Khan of Kompong Svay.

== Interpretation ==
=== An eternal reminder of Suryavarman II's ascension to the throne ===
Scholars theorize that Suryavarman II was crowned sovereign in Angkor Wat during the equinox. The temples' calibrated use of equinox sunrises to highlight the central tower and the bas-relief of the churning of the ocean of milk would have served as an eternal reminder of this king's "ringing in a new golden age."

=== A solar city ===
While Angkor is also known as an hydraulic city since Bernard Philippe Groslier, the Angkor Wat equinox manifests how Angkor was also a solar city. According to Eleanor Manikka, "measurements of the temple recorded data, fixed solar and lunar alignments, defined pathways into and out of sanctuaries, and put segments of the temple in precise association with rays of sunlight during the equinox and solstice days". Accordingly, the gigantic representation of the churning of the sea actually works as a calendar: it positions the two solstice days at the extreme north and south, counts the days between them, and measures 54 units for the north- and southbound arcs of the sun and moon, emulating the symbolism on the bridge or in the western entrances, which repeat the 54/54-unit pairs several times.

The stunning vision of the sun as it comes up over the tower transforms the previously abstract solar symbolism into a living experience. For a rare moment, the observer actually sees the calendrical function of Angkor Wat in action.

— Eleanor Mannikka, Angkor Wat: Time, Space, and Kingship, page 94

=== An ancient Khmer New Year ===
The spring equinox, which receives such a special treatment at Angkor Wat, evidently marked the onset of the calendar year. However, during the thirteenth century, many years after the reign of Suryavarman II, the Khmer New Year was moved to the fifth lunar month, Chate, which corresponds to mid-April, in order for farmers to have more time to celebrate once the dry season was over. The astrological New Year that was celebrated before then occurred when the constellation of Aries or Ram appeared. This phenomenon occurred on the vernal equinox on March 21, but because of the precession of the equinoxes, the sun at the vernal equinox is not seen in the constellation of Pisces and enters Aries around April 13 or 14.

== Tourism ==
The solar alignment of equinox at Angkor Wat is attracting a growing number of tourists, in a new trend of tourism connected to solar phenomena, also seen in such places such as Luxor and Vezelay Abbey.

In 2022, Angkor Wat ranked No. 1 as the best place in the world to watch sunrise and sunset, in part because of the Angkor Wat equinox phenomenon.

== See also ==
- Orientation of churches
- Spring equinox in Teotihuacán

== Bibliography ==
- Stencel, Robert; Gifford, Fred; Morón, Eleanor (1976-07-23). "Astronomy and Cosmology at Angkor Wat". Science. 193 (4250): 281–287. Bibcode:1976Sci...193..281S. doi:10.1126/science.193.4250.281. ISSN 0036-8075. PMID 17745714.
