= Angkor Wat =

Buddhist temple complex in Cambodia

- អង្គរវត្ត
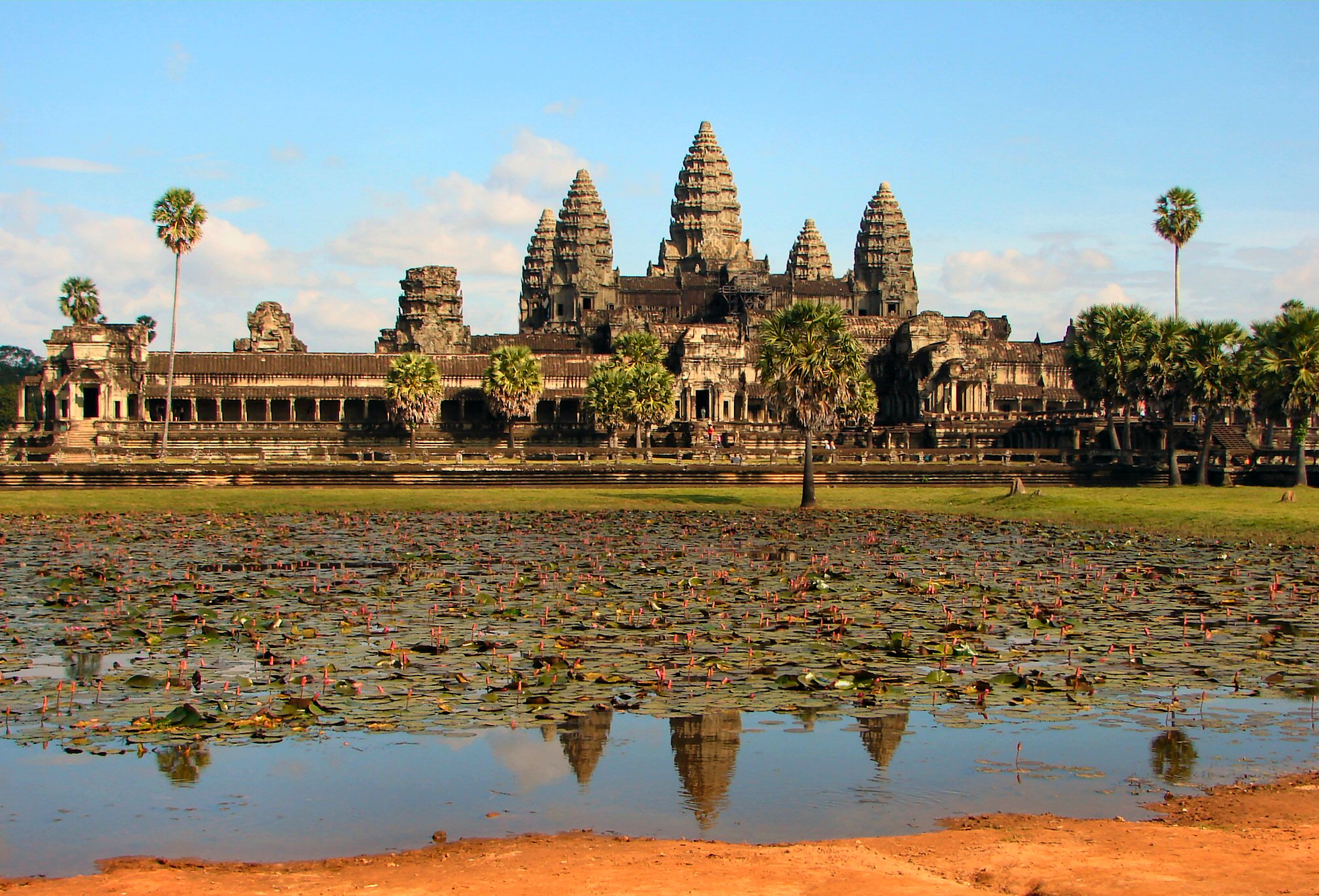
- Front side of the main complex

- Location in Cambodia

Religion
- Affiliation: Hinduism, Buddhism
- Ecclesiastical or organisational status: Active
- Status: Active

Location
- Location: Siem Reap
- Country: Cambodia
- Coordinates: 13°24′45″N 103°52′0″E

Architecture
- Type: Temple complex
- Style: Khmer architecture
- Founder: Suryavarman II
- Established: c. 1150

Specifications
- Height (max): 65 m
- Site area: 162.6 hectares
- UNESCO World Heritage Site
- Official name: Angkor
- Type: Cultural
- Criteria: i, ii, iii, iv
- Designated: 1992 (16th session)
- Reference no.: 668
- Region: Asia and the Pacific

Angkor Wat (Note: /ˌæŋkɔːr ˈwɒt/, Khmer: អង្គរវត្ត, Ǎngkô Voăt; Khmer pronunciation: [ɑːŋ.koː ʋoət], lit. 'temple city') is a Theravada Buddhist temple complex, originally built as a Vaishnava Hindu temple, in Siem Reap, Cambodia. It is the largest religious complex in the world. Located on a site measuring 162.6 hectares (1.6 km^{2}; 401.8 acres) within the medieval capital of Angkor, it was constructed between 1113 and 1150 CE during the reign of the Khmer king Suryavarman II as a Hindu temple dedicated to Vishnu. From the late 13th century onward, the complex was gradually transformed into a Buddhist temple as Khmer kings adopted Buddhism. Angkor Wat has remained a Buddhist monastery and an active center of Buddhist worship into the present day. It is noted for its monumental scale and extensive bas-reliefs and an architectural unity characteristic of Khmer architecture. Unlike most Angkorian temples, it is oriented toward the west. It is a symbol of Cambodia and appears on the Cambodian national flag.

The temple was commissioned by Suryavarman II in Yaśodharapura, the capital of the Khmer Empire, as a state temple and is generally considered to have been intended as his mausoleum. Its architectural design combines the temple-mountain and galleried temple forms characteristic of Khmer architecture. The overall layout is commonly interpreted as a symbolic representation of Mount Meru, a cosmological concept shared by both Hindu and Buddhist traditions. The complex is surrounded by a broad moat and enclosed by an outer wall, within which three progressively elevated galleries rise toward a central quincunx of towers.

From the late 13th century onward, Angkor Wat became predominantly associated with Theravāda Buddhism. It was adapted for Buddhist worship and has remained in continuous religious use, a factor that contributed to its preservation and survival as a major religious, cultural, and national symbol of Cambodia.

The temple complex fell into disuse before restoration work began on it in the 20th century, with various international agencies involved in the project. Restoration was coordinated by the International Coordinating Committee for the Safeguarding and Development of the Historic Site of Angkor (ICC-Angkor), established in 1993 under UNESCO. Major contributors included France (via the École française d'Extrême-Orient), Japan (JASA), India (Archaeological Survey of India), Germany (GACP), the United States (World Monuments Fund), South Korea, China, and Italy.

The temple is known for its architecture and its extensive bas-reliefs and devatas adorning its walls. The Angkor area was designated as a UNESCO World Heritage Site in 1992. Angkor Wat is a major tourist attraction and attracts more than 2.5 million visitors every year.

== Etymology ==
The modern name Angkor Wat, means "Temple City" or "City of Temples" in Khmer language. Angkor (អង្គរ, ǎngkô), meaning "city" or "capital city", is a vernacular form of the word nokor (នគរ nôkô), which comes from the Sanskrit/Pali word nagara (Devanāgarī: नगर). Wat (វត្ត voăt) is the word for "temple", also derived from Sanskrit/Pali vāṭa (Devanāgarī: वाट), meaning "enclosure". The original name of the temple was Vrah Viṣṇuloka or Parama Viṣṇuloka meaning "the sacred dwelling of Vishnu". The term might also mean "The king who has gone to the supreme world of Vishnu", referring to Suryavarman II posthumously and intended to venerate his glory and memory.

== History ==
=== Construction ===
Angkor Wat was commissioned by the Khmer king Suryavarman II (ruled 1113–c. 1150) in the early 12th century in Yaśodharapura (present-day Angkor), the capital of the Khmer Empire. The construction of the temple commenced in 1122 CE and was completed in 1150 CE. The temple complex was constructed on the suggestion of Divākarapaṇḍita (1040–c. 1120). The temple was dedicated to Hindu god Vishnu and the original religious motifs were derived from Hinduism. It was built as the king's state temple in the capital city. Historians have often thought that Angkor Wat served as a “temple-city,” but modern analyses of the site suggest that it housed a population of between 3,000 and 4,300 residents. As there are no foundation stela or any contemporary inscriptions referring to the temple's name that have been found, its original name is unknown and it may have been known as Vrah Viṣṇuloka after the presiding deity. The work on the temple ceased after the king's death, leaving some of the bas-relief decoration unfinished.

=== Buddhist temple ===
In 1178, approximately 27 years after the death of Suryavarman II, Angkor was sacked by the Chams, the traditional enemies of the Khmer. Thereafter, the Khmer empire was restored by Jayavarman VII, who established a new capital at Angkor Thom and the Bayon as the state temple, situated to the north. The temple was dedicated to Buddhism as the king's wife Indradevi was a devout Mahayana Buddhist who encouraged him to convert. Angkor Wat was therefore also gradually converted into a Buddhist site with many Hindu sculptures replaced by Buddhist art.

After the transformation from a Hindu centre of worship to Buddhism towards the end of the 12th century, Angkor Wat has continued to serve as a Buddhist centre until the present day. Historical records show that Chinese envoy Zhou Daguan and traveller Zheng He visited the Angkor Wat in the 13–14th centuries. Zheng He studied the temple architecture which was later incorporated in the Dabaoen Temple and Glazed Pagoda. Archaeologists have also theorized that Angkor Wat was used as a defensive fortification during this period, with gateway blockages and holes in the outer wall potentially implying the presence of a defensive structure. It is thought that these fortifications would have been constructed alongside the fortifications to the Khmer capital, Angkor Thom, in response to the encroaching threat of the Ayutthaya Empire. After the Khmer empire's fall to the Ayutthaya in 1431, Angkor Wat continued to be inhabited, with dating showing regular maintenance of the site's ponds during this period. Angkor Wat is unusual among the Angkor temples in that although it was largely neglected after the 16th century, it was never completely abandoned. Fourteen inscriptions dated from the 17th century, discovered in the Angkor area, state that Japanese Buddhist pilgrims had established small settlements alongside Khmer locals. The inscription also tells of Ukondayu Kazufusa, who celebrated the Khmer New Year at Angkor Wat in 1632. Modifications of the temple also occurred in the 17th century, with findings suggesting the demolition of several towers in the mid-1600s.

=== European rediscovery ===
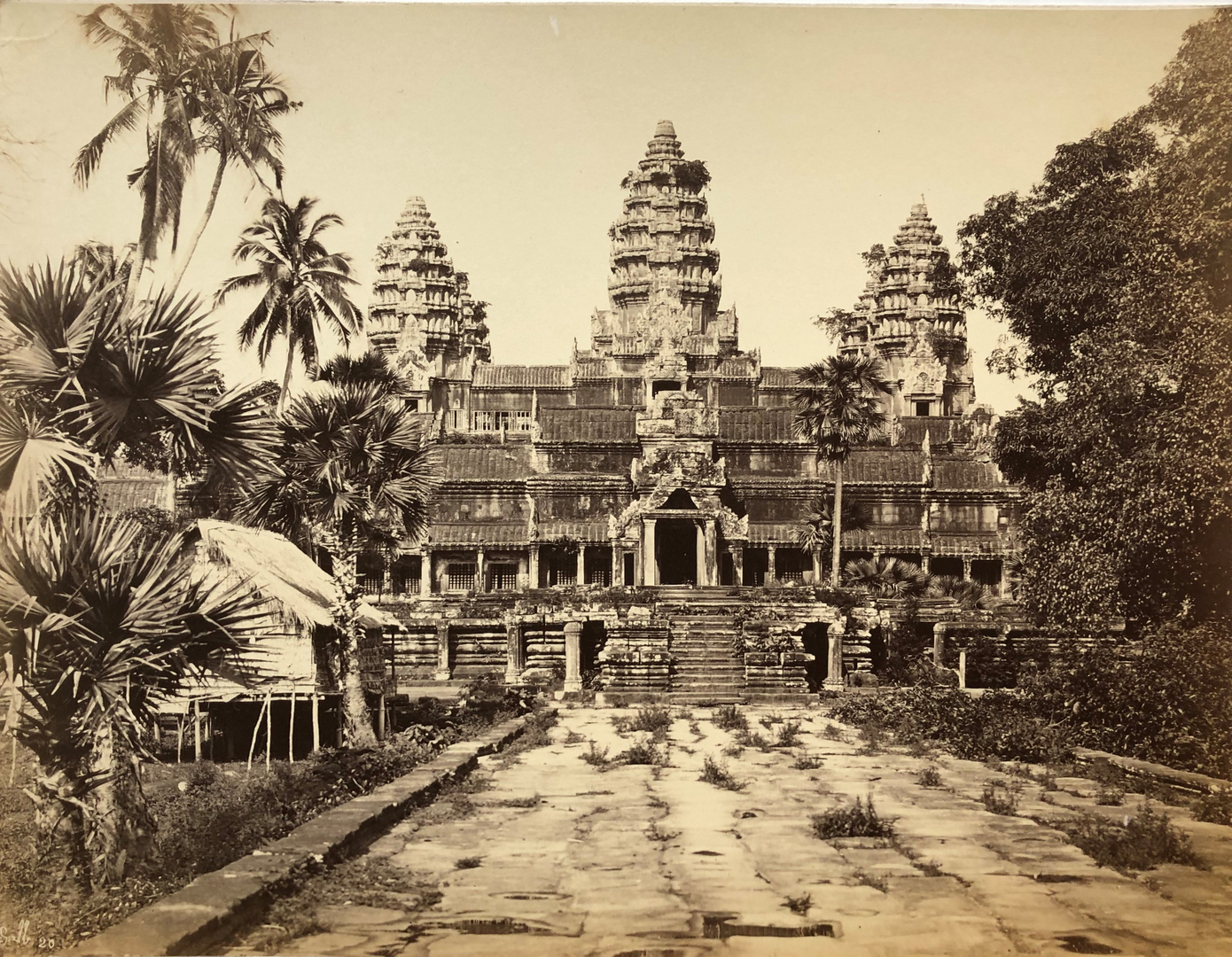
Photograph of Angkor Wat by Emile Gsell, c. 1866

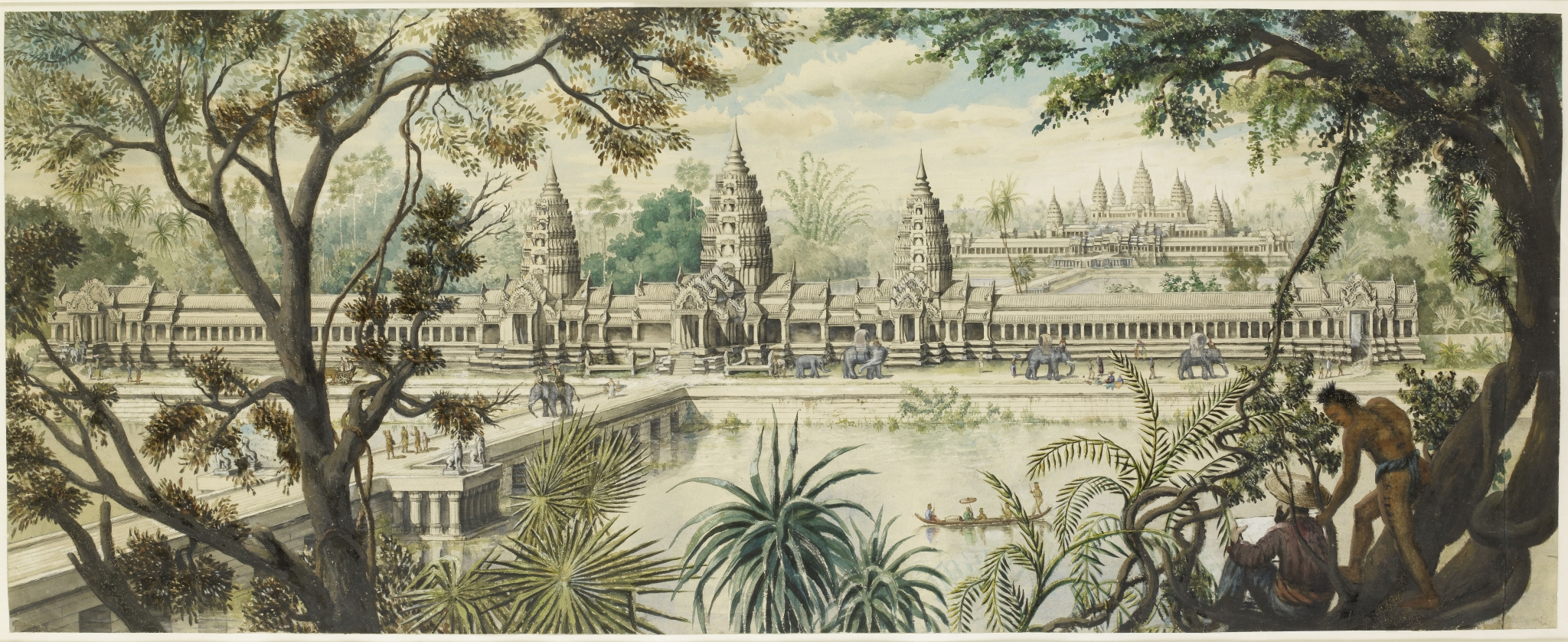
View of the West Entrance of Angkor Wat by Delaporte 1873

In the 16th century, Portuguese traders and missionaries discovered a vast stone city hidden in the northern Cambodian forests, that had seemed abandoned for over 150 years. This city contained temples, including Angkor Wat—the largest religious monument—which dominated the site. One of the first recorded visitors was António da Madalena, a Capuchin friar who explored the ruins in 1586. Three years later, he relayed his observations to Diogo do Couto, the official historian of the Portuguese Indies. Do Couto documented the friar's account in his historical writings as follows:

Half a league from this city is a temple called Angar. It is of such extraordinary construction that it is not possible to describe it with a pen, particularly since it is like no other building in the world. It has towers and decoration and all the refinements which the human genius can conceive of. There are many smaller towers of similar style, in the same stone, which are gilded. The temple is surrounded by a moat, and access is by a single bridge, protected by two stone tigers so grand and fearsome as to strike terror into the visitor.

— Diogo do Couto

In 1860, the temple was effectively rediscovered by French naturalist and explorer Henri Mouhot with the help of French missionary Father Charles-Émile Bouillevaux. Mouhot popularised the site in the West through the publication of travel notes, in which he wrote:

One of these temples, a rival to that of Solomon, and erected by some ancient Michelangelo, might take an honorable place beside our most beautiful buildings. It is grander than anything left to us by Greece or Rome, and presents a sad contrast to the state of barbarism in which the nation is now plunged.

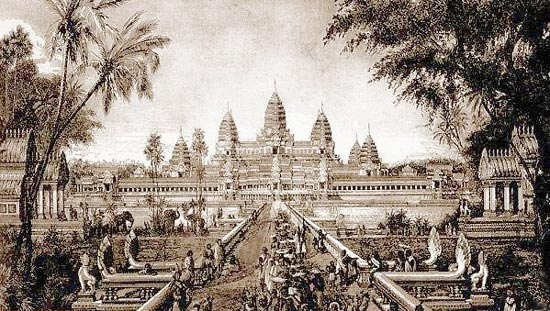
Sketch of Angkor Wat, a drawing by Louis Delaporte, c. 1880

Mouhot's work was published posthumously in 1864 through the Royal Geographical Society with descriptions of Angkor under the title Travels in the Central Parts of Indo-China, Siam, Cambodia and Laos. In 1861, German anthropologist Adolf Bastian undertook a four-year trip to Southeast Asia and his account of this trip titled The People of East Asia, ran to six volumes and was published in 1868. The books detailed the Angkor monuments but lacked drawings of the Angkorian sites.

France adopted Cambodia as a protectorate on 11 August 1863 partly due to the artistic legacy of Angkor Wat and other Khmer monuments in the Angkor region and invaded Siam. This quickly led to Cambodia reclaiming lands in the northwestern corner of the country including Siem Reap, Battambang, and Sisophon which were under Siamese rule from 1795 to 1907. Following excavations at the site, there were no ordinary dwellings or houses or other signs of settlement such as cooking utensils, weapons, or items of clothing usually found at ancient sites.

=== Restoration and conservation challenges ===
In the 20th century, a considerable effort was launched to clear the plant overgrowth and restore the temple complex. Conservation d'Angkor (Angkor Conservancy) was established by the École française d'Extrême-Orient (EFEO) in 1908. The Conservation d'Angkor was responsible for the research, conservation, and restoration activities carried out at Angkor until the early 1970s with major restoration works undertaken in the 1960s.

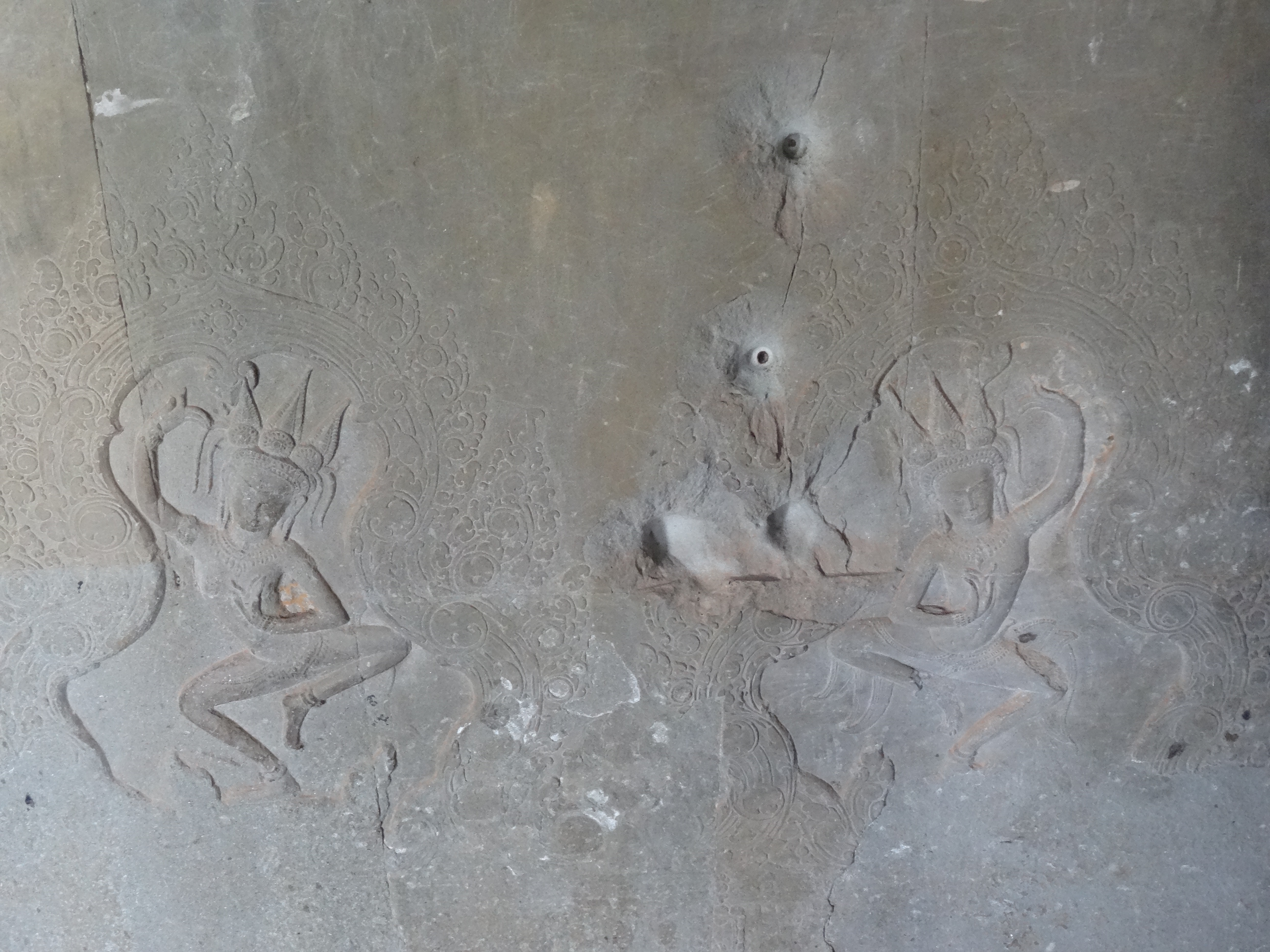
Bullet holes left by a shoot-out between the Khmer Rouge and Vietnamese forces at Angkor Wat

Restoration work was interrupted by the Cambodian Civil War when the Khmer Rouge took control of the country during the 1970s and 1980s. Work on Angkor was abandoned during the Khmer Rouge era and the Conservation d'Angkor was disbanded in 1975. Camping Khmer Rouge forces used whatever wood remained in the building structures for firewood, and a shoot-out between Khmer Rouge and Vietnamese forces caused a few bullet holes in bas reliefs. In the late 1980s and early 1990s, far more damage was done to the reliefs by art thieves working out of Cambodia who lopped off many sculptures and other structures, including earlier reconstructions. As with most other ancient temples in Cambodia, Angkor Wat also faced extensive damage and deterioration by a combination of plant overgrowth, fungi, ground movements, war damage, and theft, though the war damage to Angkor Wat's temples was limited compared to the rest of Cambodia's temple ruins.

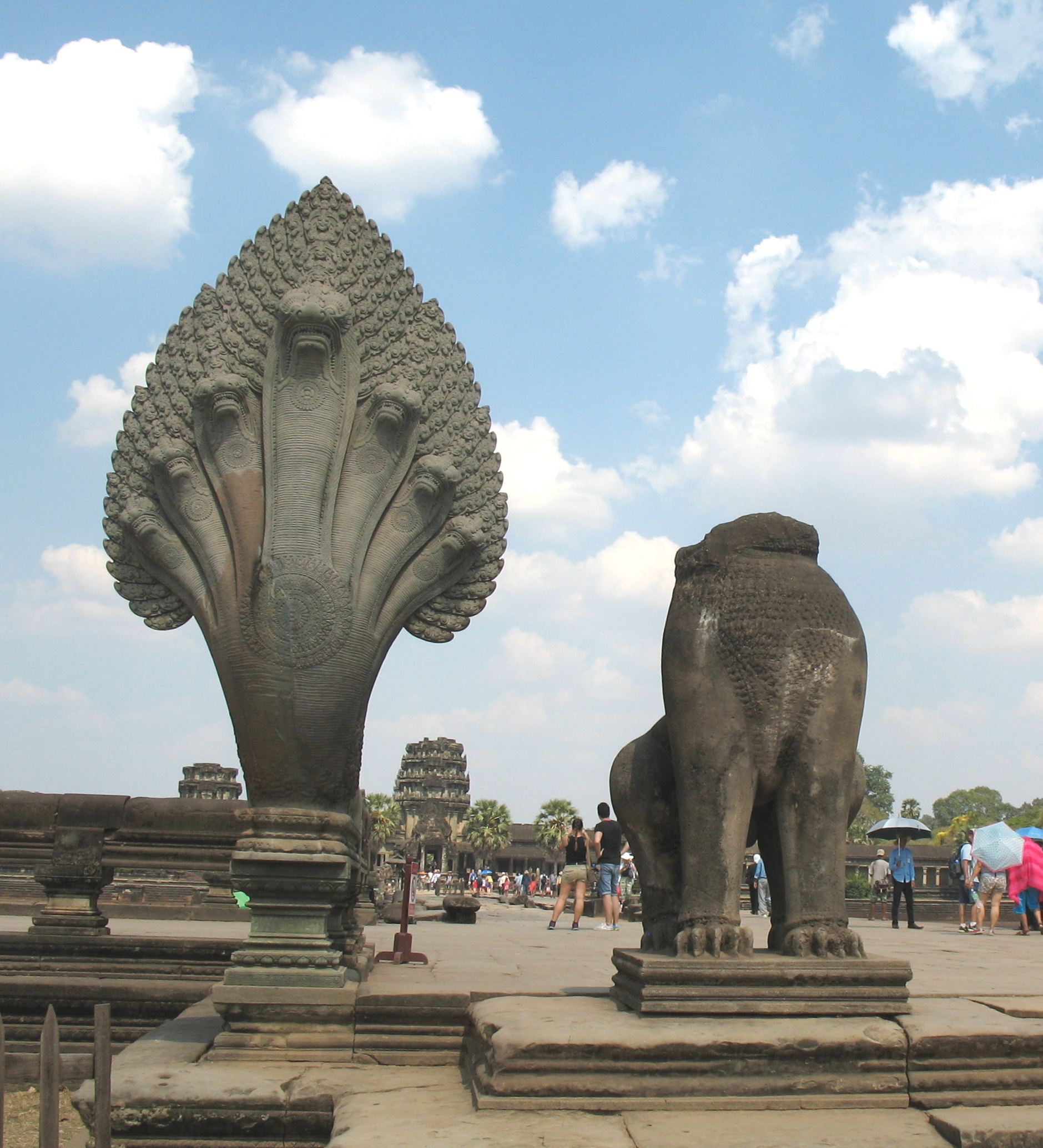
The restored head of a nāga beside an unrestored lion sculpture leading to the entrance of Angkor Wat

Between 1986 and 1992, the Archaeological Survey of India carried out restoration work on the temple as France did not recognise the Cambodian government at the time. Criticisms have been raised about both the early French restoration attempts and the later Indian work, with concerns over the damage done to the stone surface by the use of various chemicals and cement.

In 1992, the site was declared as a UNESCO World Heritage Site. Simultaneously, Angkor Wat was listed in UNESCO's World Heritage in Danger (later removed in 2004) following an appeal for help by Norodom Sihanouk together with an appeal by UNESCO to the international community to save Angkor. Zoning of the area was designated to protect the Angkor site in 1994, Authority for the Protection and Management of Angkor and the Region of Siem Reap (APSARA) was established in 1995 to protect and manage the area, and a law to protect Cambodian heritage was passed in 1996.

A World Monuments Fund video on conservation of Angkor Wat

In the 21st century, teams from several countries including France, India, Japan and China are involved in Angkor Wat conservation projects. The German Apsara Conservation Project (GACP) was launched to protect the devatas, and other bas-reliefs that decorate the temple from further damage when the organization's survey found that around 20% of the reliefs were in very poor condition mainly because of natural erosion and deterioration of the stone, but also in part also due to earlier restoration efforts. Microbial biofilms degraded sandstone at Angkor Wat. Other work involved the repair of collapsed sections of the structure and prevention of further collapse. For example, the west facade of the upper level was buttressed by scaffolding in 2002. A Japanese team completed the restoration of the north library of the outer enclosure in 2005. Replicas have been made to replace some of the lost or damaged sculptures.

In December 2015, it was announced that a research team from the University of Sydney found a previously unseen ensemble of buried towers that were built and demolished during the construction of Angkor Wat, as well as a massive structure, with wooden fortifications, of unknown purpose on its south side. The findings included evidence of low-density residential occupation, a road grid, ponds and mounds in the region. These discoveries indicated that the temple precinct, bounded by a moat and wall, may not have been used exclusively by the priestly elite, as was previously thought.

== Architecture ==
Angkor Wat is a Buddhist temple complex. Located on a site measuring 162.6 ha (1,626,000 m^{2}; 402 acres) within the ancient Khmer capital city of Angkor, it is considered as the largest religious structure in the world by Guinness World Records.

=== Site and plan ===
Plan of Angkor Wat

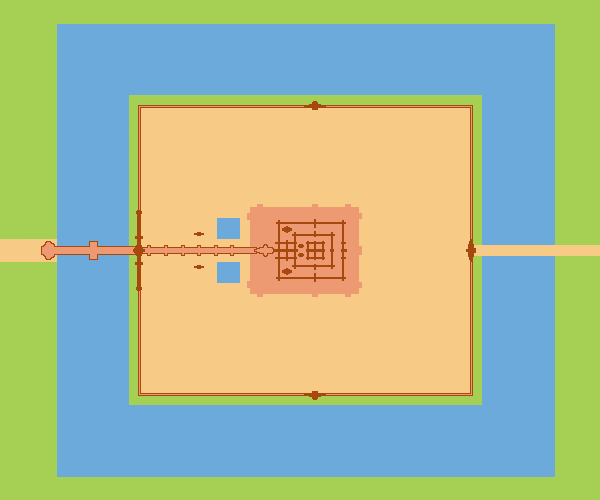
The general layout of Angkor Wat with its central structure in the middle

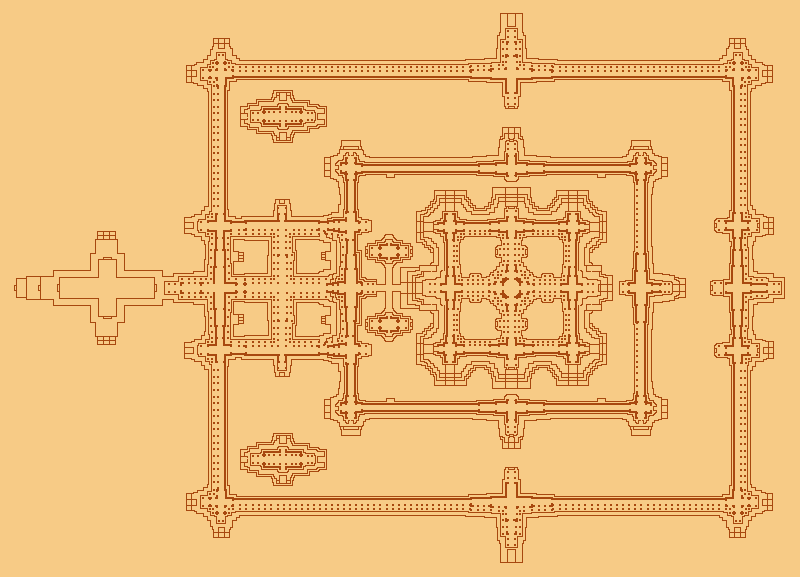
A detailed plan of the central structure

Angkor Wat is a unique combination of the temple mountain (the standard design for the empire's state temples) and the later plan of concentric galleries, most of which were originally derived from religious beliefs of Hinduism. Angkor Wat also served a practical purpose for the Khmer Empire as well, with its dam and resulting moats serving as both connections to the Angkor water network and a means of storing water between the monsoon and dry seasons of the region. The construction of Angkor Wat suggests that there was a celestial significance with certain features of the temple. This is observed in the temple's east–west orientation, and lines of sight from terraces within the temple that show specific towers to be at the precise location of the solstice at sunrise. The Angkor Wat temple's main tower aligns with the morning sun of the spring equinox. The temple is a representation of Mount Meru, the home of the gods according to Hindu mythology: the central quincunx of towers symbolise the five peaks of the mountain, and the walls and moat symbolise the surrounding mountain ranges and ocean. Access to the upper areas of the temple was progressively more exclusive, with the laity being admitted only to the lowest level.

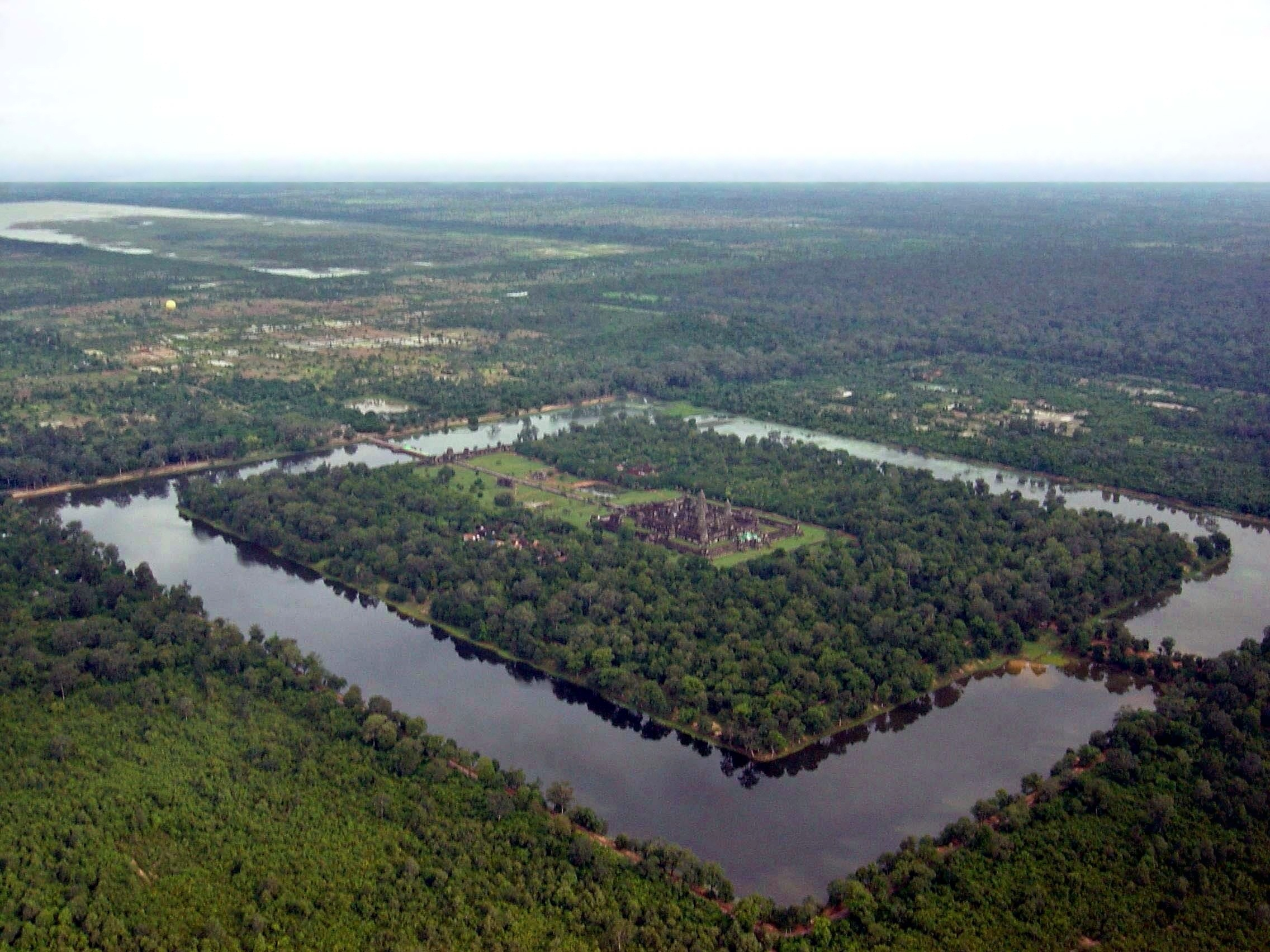
An aerial view of Angkor Wat

Unlike most Khmer temples, Angkor Wat is oriented to the west rather than the east. This has led scholars including Maurice Glaize and George Coedès to hypothesize that Suryavarman intended it to serve as his funerary temple. Further evidence for this view is provided by the bas-reliefs, which proceed in a counter-clockwise direction—prasavya in Hindu terminology—as this is the reverse of the normal order. Rituals take place in reverse order during Brahminic funeral services. Archaeologist Charles Higham also describes a container that may have been a funerary jar that was recovered from the central tower. Freeman and Jacques, however, note that several other temples of Angkor depart from the typical eastern orientation, and suggest that Angkor Wat's alignment was due to its dedication to Vishnu, who was associated with the west.

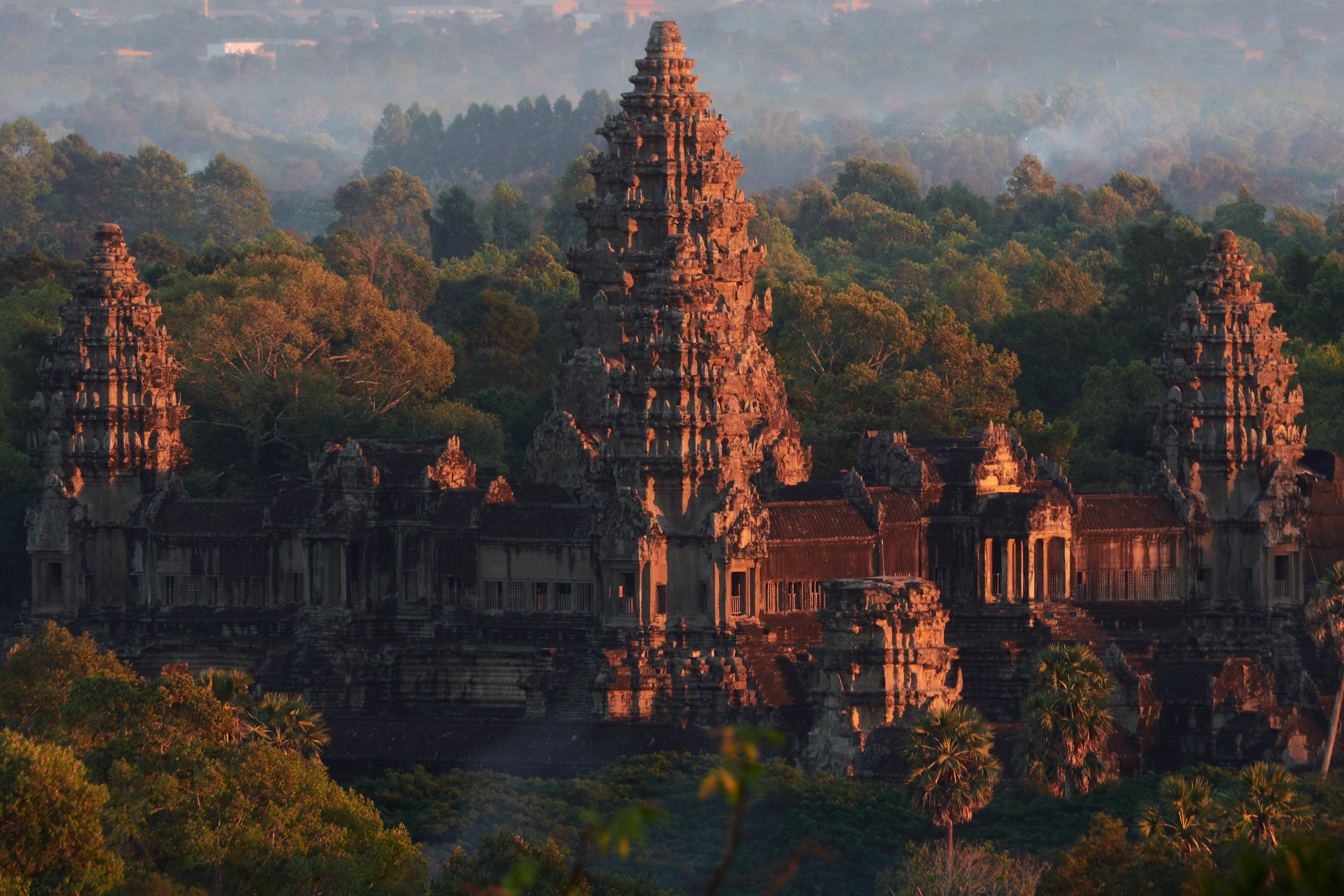
Angkor Wat from Phnom Bakheng

Drawing on the temple's alignment and dimensions, and on the content and arrangement of the bas-reliefs, researcher Eleanor Mannikka argues that the structure represents a claimed new era of peace under King Suryavarman II: "as the measurements of solar and lunar time cycles were built into the sacred space of Angkor Wat, this divine mandate to rule was anchored to consecrated chambers and corridors meant to perpetuate the king's power and to honour and placate the deities manifest in the heavens above." Mannikka's suggestions have been received with a mixture of interest and scepticism in academic circles. She distances herself from the speculations of others, such as Graham Hancock, that Angkor Wat is part of a representation of the constellation Draco. The oldest surviving plan of Angkor Wat dates to 1715 and is credited to Fujiwara Tadayoshi. The plan is stored in the Suifu Meitoku-kai Shokokan Museum in Mito, Japan.

=== Style ===
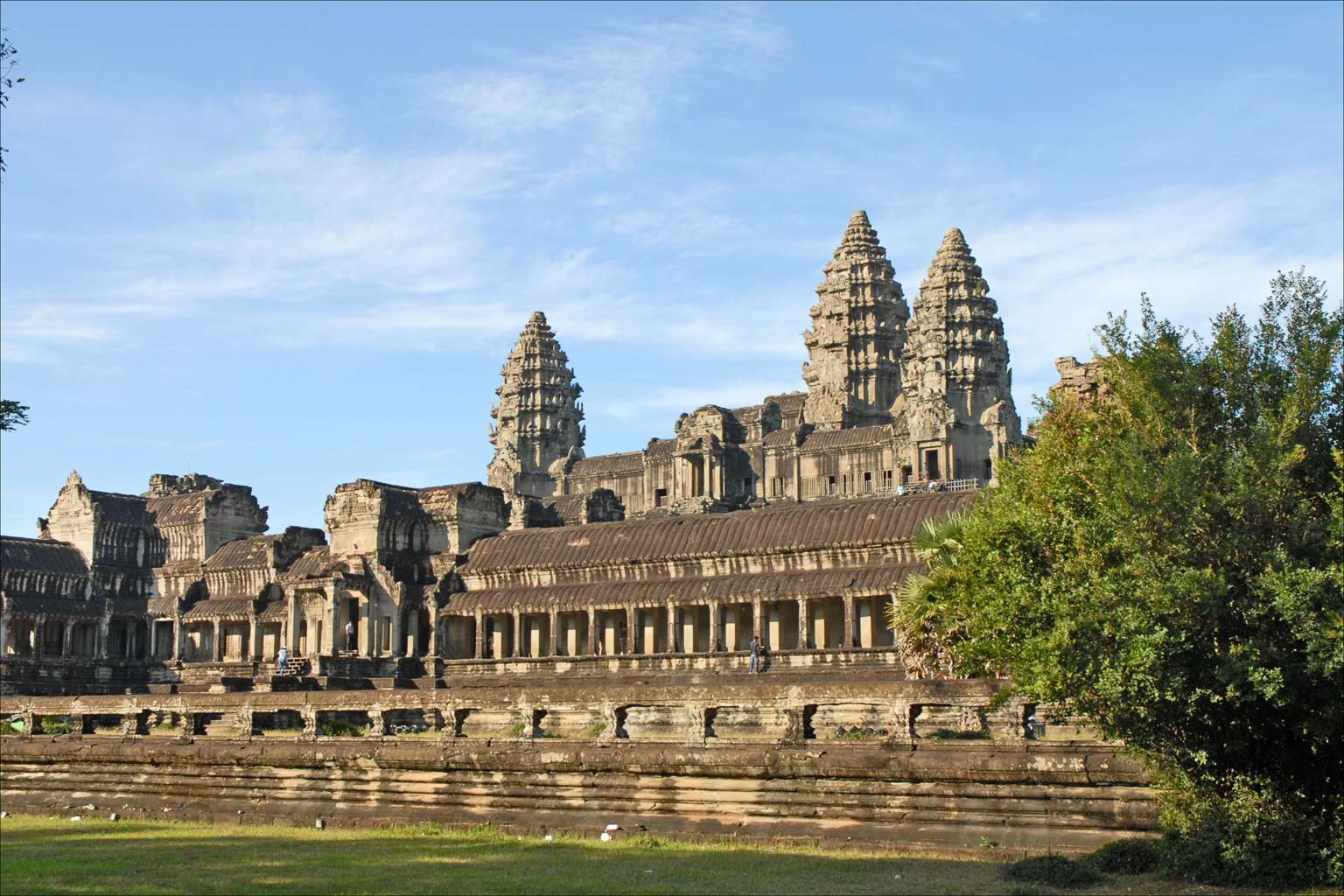
Side view showing the Gopurams and galleries

Angkor Wat is the prime example of the classical style of Khmer architecture known as the Angkor Wat style. Architecturally, the elements characteristic of the style include the ogival, redented towers shaped like lotus buds; half-galleries to broaden passageways; axial galleries connecting enclosures; and the cruciform terraces which appear along the main axis of the temple. Typical decorative elements are devatas (or apsaras), bas-reliefs, pediments, extensive garlands and narrative scenes. The statuary of Angkor Wat is considered conservative, being more static and less graceful than earlier work. Other elements of the design have been destroyed by looting and the passage of time, including gilded stucco on the towers, gilding on some figures on the bas-reliefs, and wooden ceiling panels and doors.

According to Maurice Glaize, the temple "attains a classic perfection by the restrained monumentality of its finely balanced elements and the precise arrangement of its proportions. It is a work of power, unity, and style." Architect Jacques Dumarçay believes the layout of Angkor Wat borrows Chinese influence in its system of galleries which join at right angles to form courtyards. The axial pattern of the plan of Angkor Wat may be derived from Southeast Asian cosmology in combination with the mandala represented by the main temple.

=== Features ===
==== Outer enclosure ====
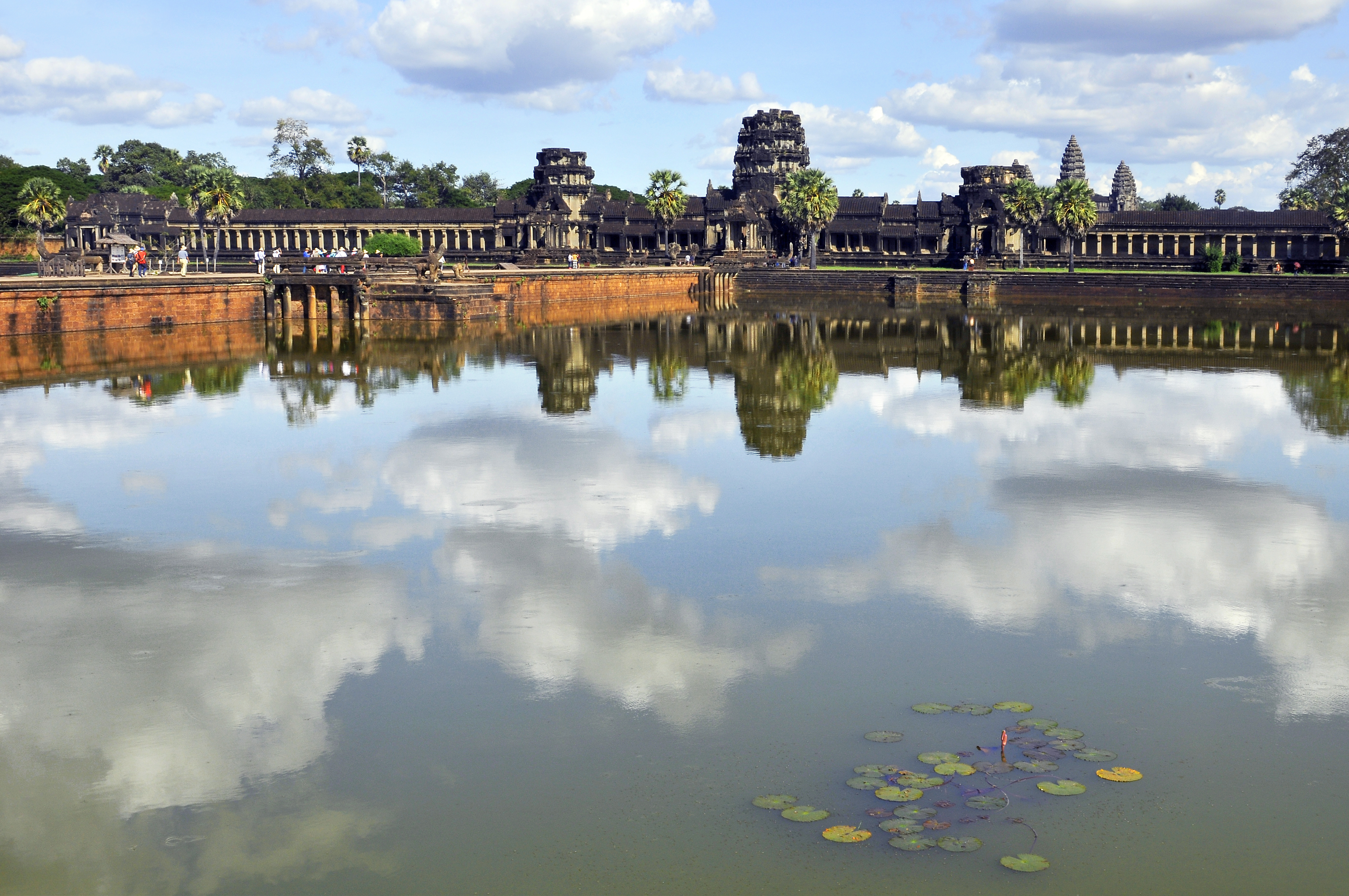
Part of the wall of the outer enclosure and the moat

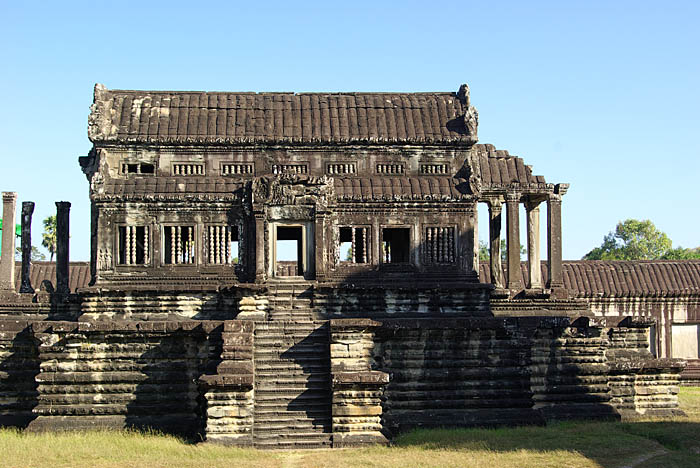
The Northern library

The temple complex is surrounded by an outer wall, 1,024 m (3,360 ft) by 802 m (2,631 ft) and 4.5 m (15 ft) high. It is encircled by a 30 m (98 ft) apron of open ground and a moat 190 m (620 ft) wide and over 5 km (3.1 mi) in perimeter. The moat extends 1.5 km (0.93 mi) from east to west and 1.3 km (0.81 mi) from north to south. Access to the temple is by an earth bank to the east and a sandstone causeway to the west; the latter, the main entrance, is a later addition, possibly replacing a wooden bridge. There is a Gopuram at each of the cardinal points with the western one being the largest and consisting of three partially ruined towers. Maurice Glaize notes that this gopura both hides and echoes the form of the temple proper. The main enclosure also served as a residential area, having been built on a grid system of residential “blocks.” These blocks consist of mounds and ponds indicative of a basic Khmer hamlet structure, with the mounds serving as the basis for residences and ponds providing a means of water storage for inhabitants.

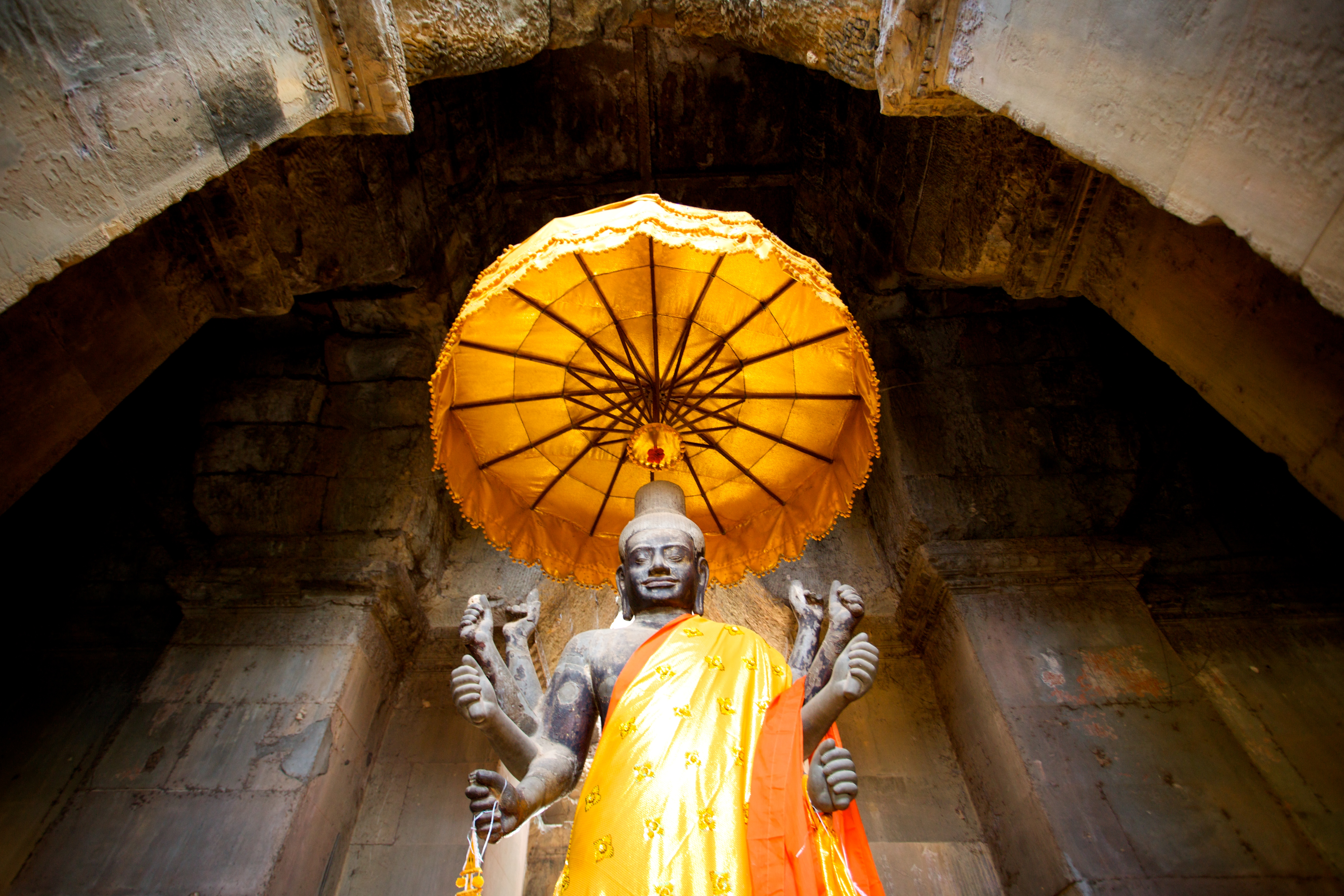
Ta Reach, originally an eight-armed statue of Vishnu

Under the southern tower is a statue known as Ta Reach, originally an eight-armed statue of Vishnu that may have occupied the temple's central shrine. Galleries run between the towers and two further entrances on either side of the gopura often referred to as "elephant gates", as they are large enough to admit those animals. These galleries have square pillars on the outer (west) side and a closed wall on the inner (east) side. The ceiling between the pillars is decorated with lotus rosettes. The west face of the wall is decorated with dancing figures and the east face of the wall consists of windows with balusters, decorated with dancing figures, animals and devatas.

The outer wall encloses a space of 203 acres (82 ha), which besides the temple proper was originally occupied by people from the city and the royal palace to the north of the temple. Similar to other secular buildings of Angkor, these were built of perishable materials rather than of stone, so nothing remains of them except the outline of some of the streets with most of the area now covered by vegetation. A 350 m (1,150 ft) causeway connects the western gopura to the temple proper, with naga shaped balustrades and six sets of steps leading down to the outside on either side. Each side also features a library with entrances at each cardinal point, in front of the third set of stairs from the entrance, and a pond between the library and the temple itself. The ponds are later additions to the design, as is the cruciform terrace guarded by lions connecting the causeway to the central structure.

==== Central structure ====
The temple stands on a raised terrace within the walled enclosure. It is made of three rectangular galleries rising to a central tower, each level higher than the last. The two inner galleries each have four large towers at their ordinal corners (that is, North-west, North-east, South-east, and South-west) surrounding a higher fifth tower. This pattern is sometimes called a quincunx and is believed to represent the mountains of Meru. Because the temple faces west, the features are set back towards the east, leaving more space to be filled in each enclosure and gallery on the west side; for the same reason, the west-facing steps are shallower than those on the other sides.

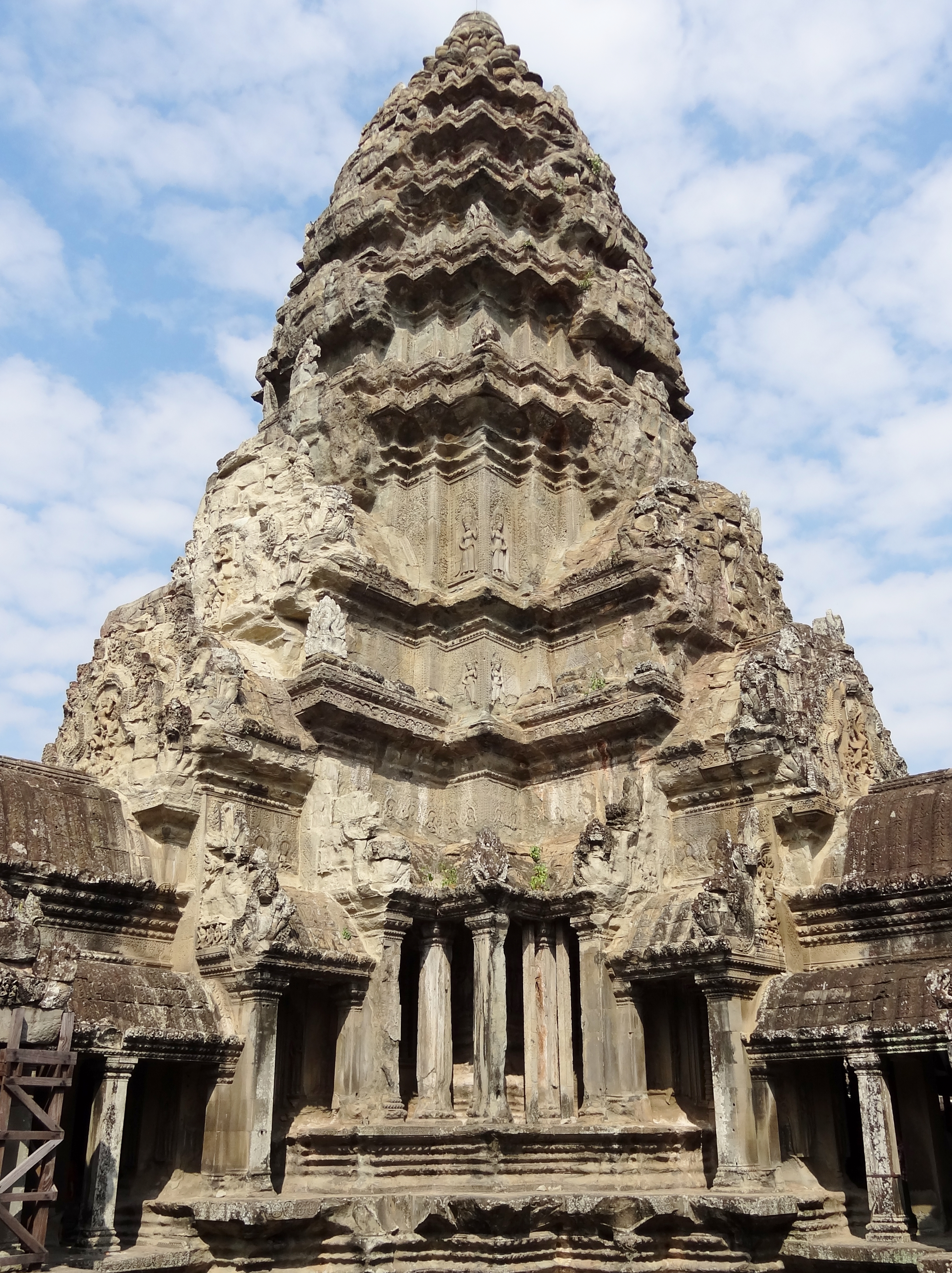
The central tower symbolizing the sacred Mount Meru

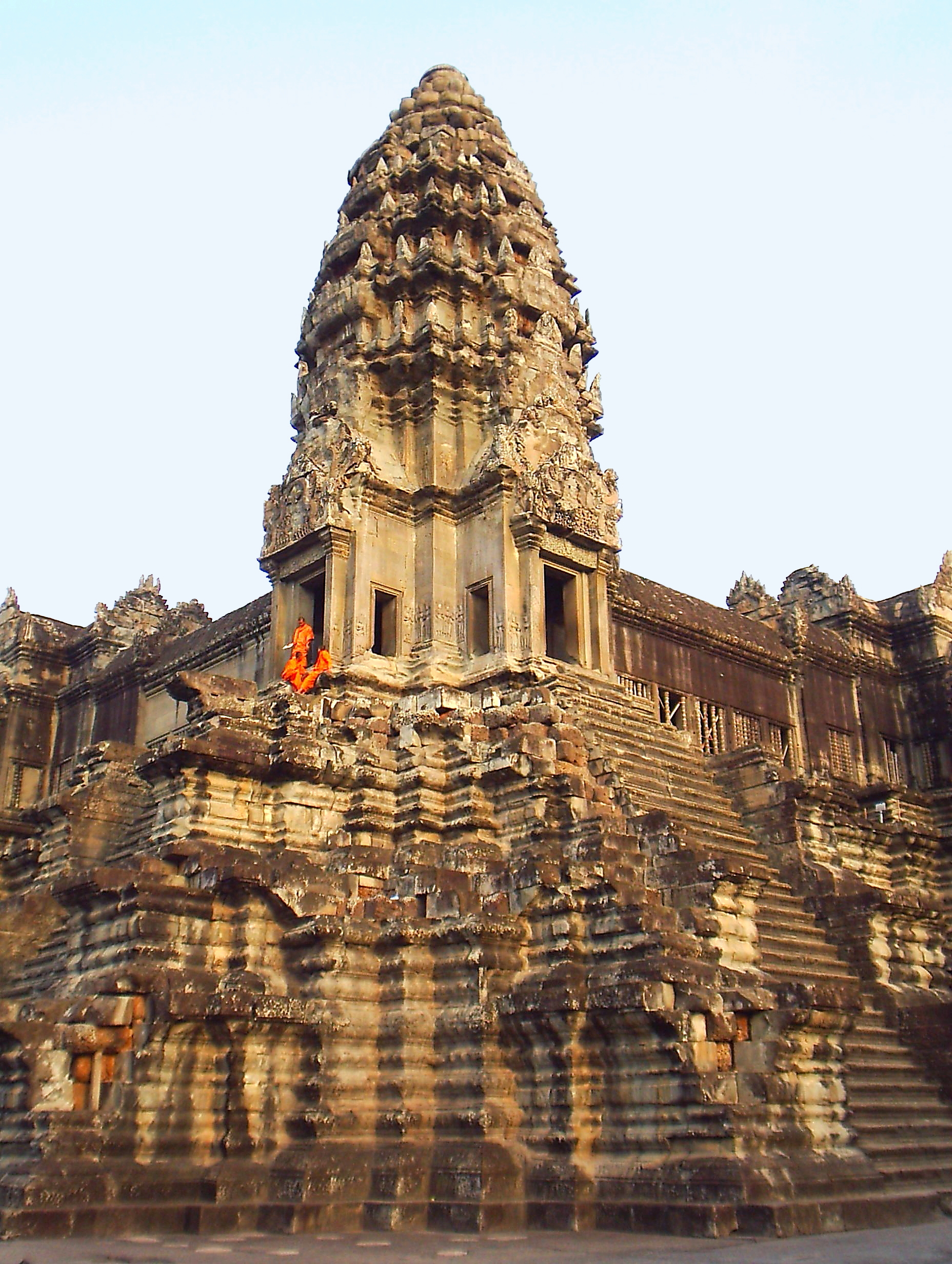
One of the four corner towers of Angkor Wat

Mannikka interprets the galleries as being dedicated to the king, Brahma, the moon, and Vishnu. Each gallery has a gopura with the outer gallery measuring 187 m (614 ft) by 215 m (705 ft), with pavilions at the corners. The gallery is open to the outside of the temple, with columned half-galleries extending and buttressing the structure. Connecting the outer gallery to the second enclosure on the west side is a cruciform cloister called Preah Poan (meaning "The Thousand Buddhas" gallery). Buddha images were left in the cloister by pilgrims over the centuries, although most have now been removed. This area has many inscriptions relating to the good deeds of pilgrims, most written in Khmer but others in Burmese and Japanese. The four small courtyards marked out by the cloister may originally have been filled with water. North and south of the cloister are libraries.

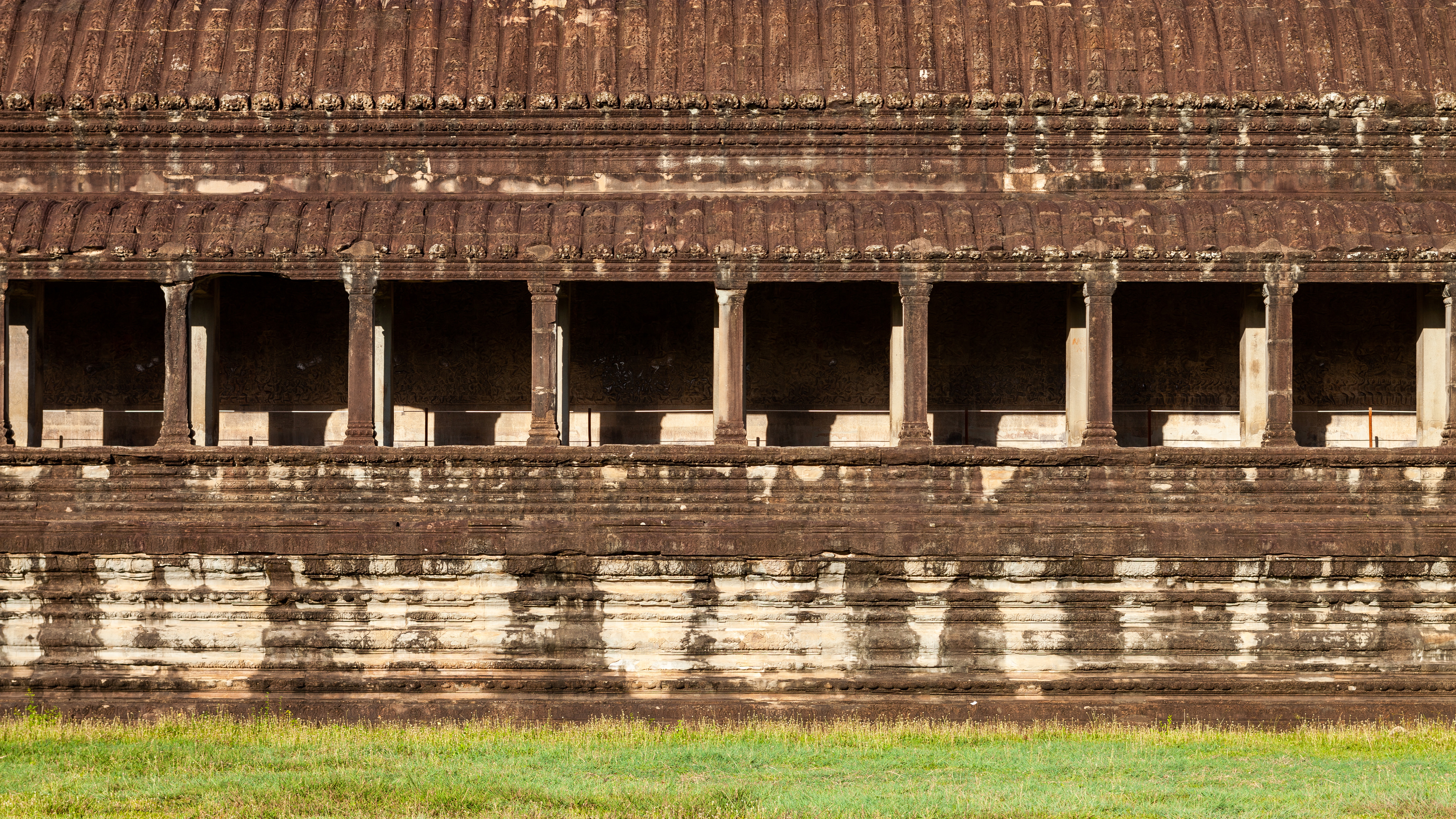
A view of the outer gallery of Angkor Wat

Beyond, the second and inner galleries are connected to two flanking libraries by another cruciform terrace, again a later addition. From the second level upwards, devata images are abound on the walls, singly or in groups of up to four. The second-level enclosure is 100 m (330 ft) by 115 m (377 ft), and may originally have been flooded to represent the ocean around Mount Meru. Three sets of steps on each side lead up to the corner towers and gopuras of the inner gallery. The steep stairways may represent the difficulty of ascending to the kingdom of the gods. This inner gallery, called the Bakan, is a 60 m (200 ft) square with axial galleries connecting each gopura with the central shrine and subsidiary shrines located below the corner towers.

The roofings of the galleries are decorated with the motif of the body of a snake ending in the heads of lions or garudas. Carved lintels and pediments decorate the entrances to the galleries and the shrines. The tower above the central shrine rises 43 m (141 ft) to a height of 65 m (213 ft) above the ground; unlike those of previous temple mountains, the central tower is raised above the surrounding four. The shrine itself, originally occupied by a statue of Vishnu and open on each side, was walled in when the temple was converted to Theravada Buddhism, the new walls featuring standing Buddhas. In 1934, the conservator George Trouvé excavated the pit beneath the central shrine: filled with sand and water it had already been robbed of its treasure, but he did find a sacred foundation deposit of gold leaf two metres above ground level.

==== Decoration ====
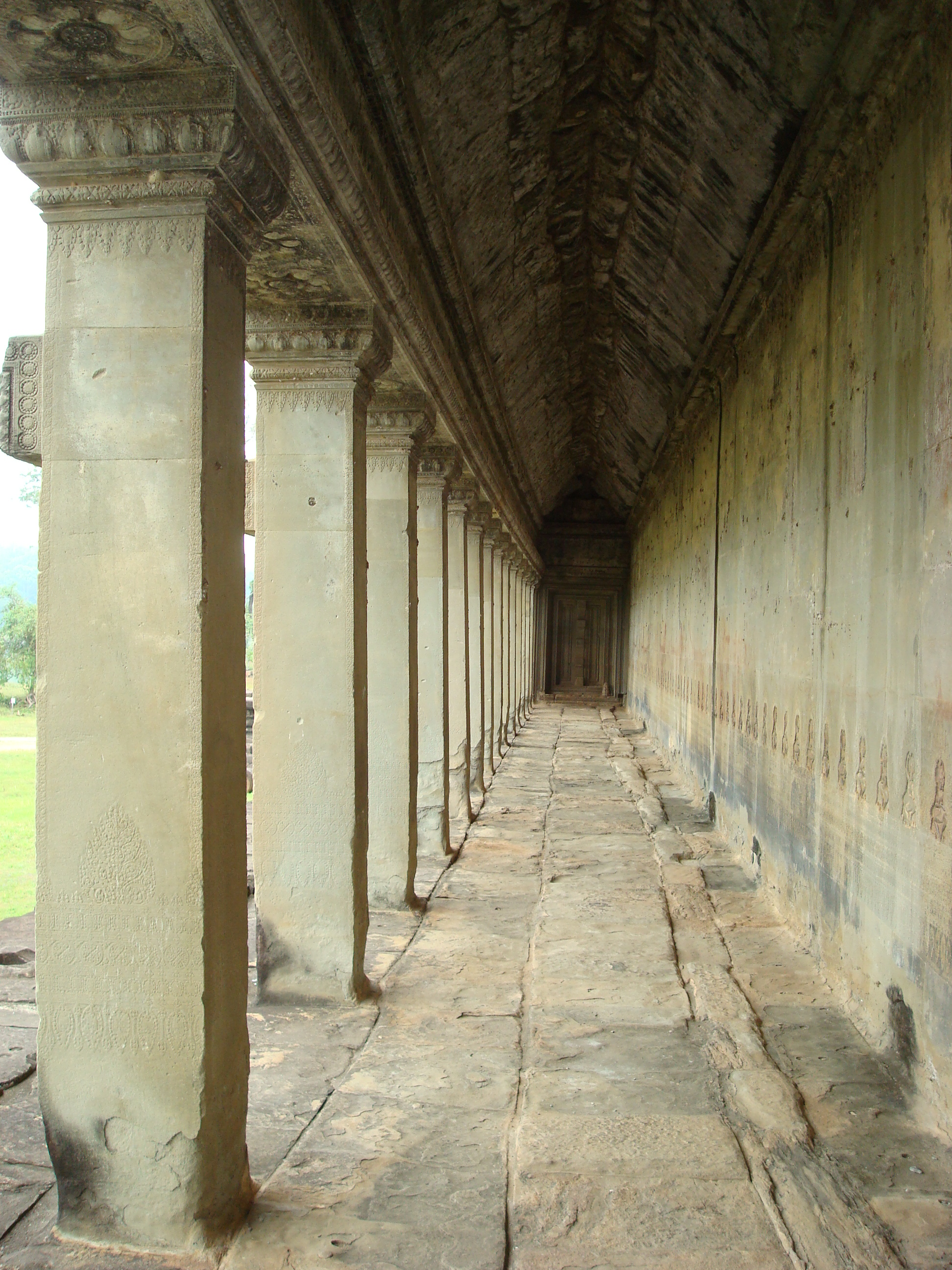
Corridor

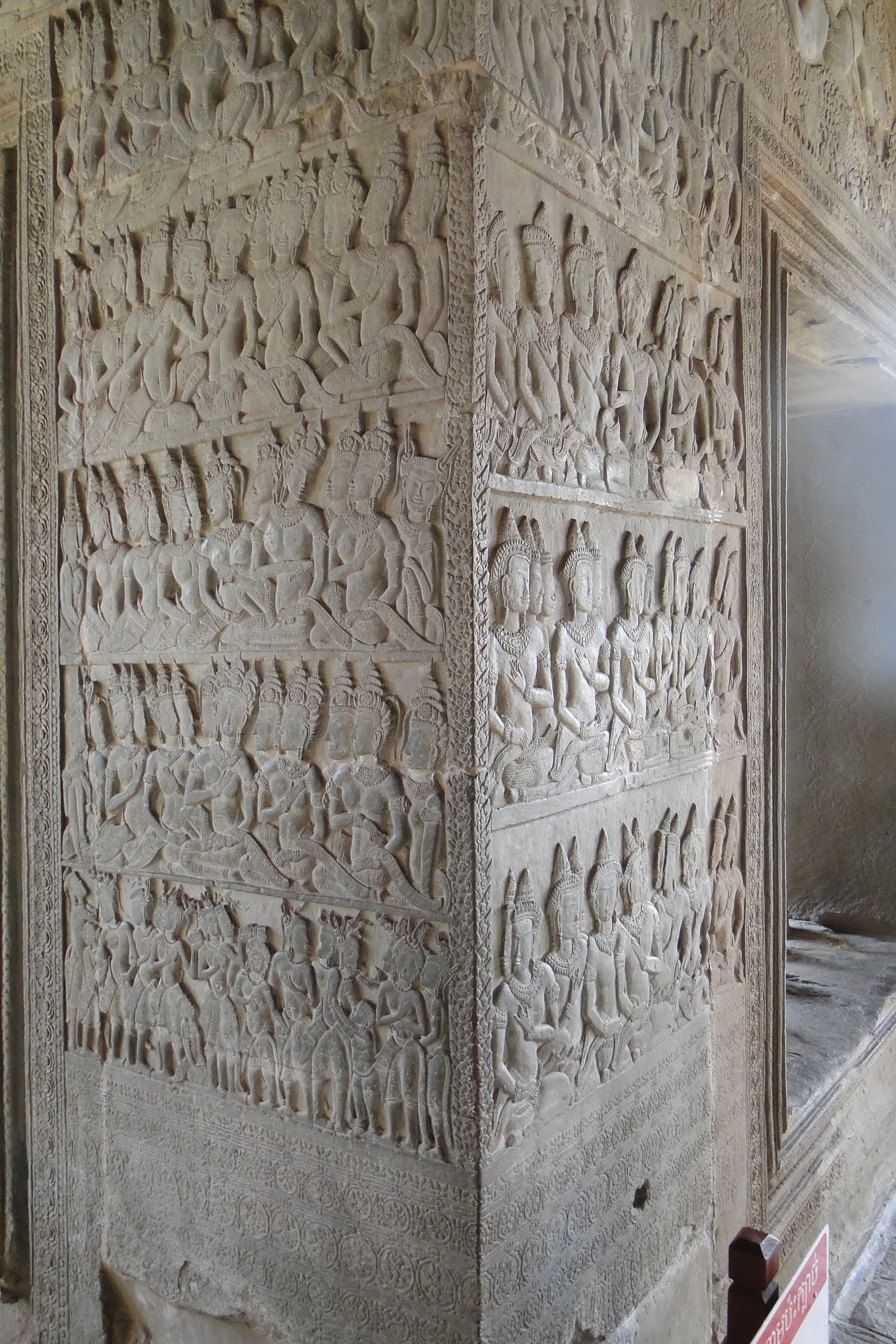
Decoration on the corner

Integrated with the architecture of the building, one of the causes for its fame is Angkor Wat's extensive decoration, which predominantly takes the form of bas-relief friezes. The inner walls of the outer gallery bear a series of large-scale scenes mainly depicting episodes from the Hindu epics the Ramayana and the Mahabharata. Higham has called these "the greatest known linear arrangement of stone carving". From the north-west corner anti-clockwise, the western gallery shows the Battle of Lanka from the Ramayana, in which Rama defeats Ravana; and the Kurukshetra War from the Mahabharata, depicting the mutual annihilation of the Kaurava and Pandava armies. On the southern gallery, the only historical scene, a procession of Suryavarman II is depicted along with the 32 hells and 37 heavens of Hinduism.

On the eastern gallery is one of the most celebrated scenes, the Churning of the Sea of Milk, showing 92 asuras and 88 devas using the serpent Vasuki to churn the sea of milk under Vishnu's direction. Mannikka counts only 91 asuras and explains the asymmetrical numbers as representing the number of days from the winter solstice to the spring equinox, and from the equinox to the summer solstice. It is followed by reliefs showing Vishnu defeating asuras, which was a 16th-century addition. The northern gallery shows Krishna's victory over Bana.

Angkor Wat is decorated with depictions of apsaras and devatas with more than 1,796 documented depictions of devatas in the research inventory. The architects also used small apsara images (30–40 cm or 12–16 in) as decorative motifs on pillars and walls. They incorporated larger devata images (full-body portraits measuring approximately 95–110 cm or 37–43 in) more prominently at every level of the temple from the entry pavilion to the tops of the high towers. In 1927, Sappho Marchal published a study cataloging the remarkable diversity of their hair, headdresses, garments, stance, jewellery, and decorative flowers depicted in the reliefs, which Marchal concluded were based on actual practices of the Angkor period.

=== Construction techniques ===
By the 12th century, Khmer architects had become skilled and confident in the use of sandstone rather than brick or laterite as the main building material. Using SAP2000, a popular and effective structural analysis tool, graywacke, a durable sandstone usually found in or near water, has been found to make up much of the structures. Recent LIDAR scans have also revealed that the temple was built upon roughly 3 million cubic meters of fill. Most of the visible areas are made of Kulen sandstone blocks, while laterite was used for the outer wall and hidden structural parts. The binding agent used to join the blocks is yet to be identified, although natural resins or slaked lime have been suggested. When doing the base construction, they would focus on bedding plane orientation due to its high structural rigidity characteristics. The monument was made of five to ten million sandstone blocks with a maximum weight of 1.5 tons each. The sandstone was quarried and transported from Mount Kulen, a quarry approximately 40 km (25 mi) northeast.

The route has been suggested to span 35 km (22 mi) along a canal towards Tonlé Sap lake, another 35 km (22 mi) crossing the lake, and finally 15 km (9 mi) against the current along Siem Reap River, making a total journey of 90 km (55 mi). In 2011, Etsuo Uchida and Ichita Shimoda of Waseda University in Tokyo discovered a shorter 35 km (22 mi) canal connecting Mount Kulen and Angkor Wat using satellite imagery and believe that the Khmer used this route instead. Through radiocarbon dating, evidence indicates that throughout Angkor Wat's occupation, it was regularly maintained with wooden architectural parts being replaced.

Most of the surfaces, columns, lintels and roofs are carved with reliefs illustrating scenes from Indian literature including unicorns, griffins, winged dragons pulling chariots, as well as warriors following an elephant-mounted leader, and celestial dancing girls with elaborate hairstyles. Others depicted boats and other architectural structures. The gallery wall is decorated with almost 1,000 m^{2} (11,000 sq ft) of bas reliefs. Holes on some of the Angkor walls indicate that they may have been decorated with bronze sheets which were highly prized in ancient times and were prime targets for robbers. Based on experiments, the labour force to quarry, transport, carve and install so much sandstone probably ran into the thousands including many highly skilled artisans. The skills required to carve these sculptures were developed hundreds of years earlier, as demonstrated by some artefacts that have been dated to the seventh century, before the Khmer came to power.

=== Astronomical and cosmological alignment ===
Several studies have observed that during the spring and autumn equinoxes, the rising sun aligns with the central tower when viewed from the western entrance causeway. While interpretations vary, this alignment is generally regarded as intentional and indicative of astronomical considerations in the temple's design.

In later Buddhist interpretations, the temple's central towers, vertical axis, and concentric galleries have been understood as representing a symbolic cosmological structure centered on Mount Meru, the sacred axis of the universe in both Hindu and Buddhist cosmology. Within a Buddhist framework, this symbolism emphasizes spiritual progression rather than divine kingship and aligns with concepts found in Theravāda Buddhist thought that developed in mainland Southeast Asia. Chronologically, the moat and wall symbolize the separational boundary between earth and the home of the gods. Progressing on the journey towards the central structure, towers increase in size, representing the spiritual journey towards the mountain dwelling of the gods, represented by the largest, central structure. Such reinterpretations contributed to Angkor Wat's continued use as a place of worship, distinguishing it from many other monuments of the Angkor region that were abandoned after the decline of the Khmer state.

== Symbolism and popular culture ==
Cambodian national flag showing Angkor Wat

Due to the global attention that it has received and the millions of visitors it attracts, the Angkor Wat has become a prominent image that is associated with Cambodia, and in this way has become a symbol of Cambodia itself. A depiction of Angkor Wat has been a part of the Cambodian national flag since the introduction of the first version in 1863.

From a historical and trans-cultural perspective, however, the temple of Angkor Wat did not become a symbol of national pride by itself but had been inscribed into a larger politico-cultural process of French-colonial heritage productions. Angkor Wat caught the attention and imagination of a wider audience in Europe when the pavilion of French protectorate of Cambodia, as part of French Indochina, recreated the life-size replica of Angkor Wat presented in French colonial and universal exhibitions in Paris and Marseille between 1889 and 1937. It was on display in the plaster cast museum of Louis Delaporte called musée Indo-chinois which existed in the Parisian Trocadero Palace from c.1880 to the mid-1920s.

== Myths ==
Myths associated with Angkor Wat reflect the influence of Buddhist traditions that developed in Cambodia over several centuries. By the 16th and 17th centuries, Theravada Buddhism had become the dominant religious system in the region, contributing to a gradual reinterpretation of the monument from a Hindu temple into a sacred Buddhist site. During this period, Buddhism reshaped local narratives regarding the purpose and meaning of the temple, and several myths emerged relating the structure to Buddhist cosmology.

In the 17th century, Japanese pilgrims travelling in Southeast Asia identified Angkor Wat as Jetavana, the monastic garden associated with the Buddha in ancient Magadha (present-day India). Surviving Japanese inscriptions and maps depict the complex as a Buddhist holy site, and some accounts describe it as a place visited or inhabited by the Buddha. This interpretation linked Angkor Wat to broader regional pilgrimage practices and contributed to Buddhist-oriented mythic traditions surrounding the monument.

Local Cambodian traditions also reframed Angkor Wat within Buddhist cosmological narratives. Folklore identifies the temple as a site of merit-making, meditation, and spiritual ascent, sometimes described as a gateway between human and divine realms. Additional myths propose that the temple's extensive bas-reliefs encode hidden Buddhist teachings, despite their depiction of Hindu epics. Such traditions contributed to the temple's perception as a universal sacred monument rather than a site tied to a single religious identity.

By the 18th and 19th centuries, evidence indicates a continuous Buddhist monastic presence at Angkor Wat, including the establishment of shrines, carvings of Buddha images, and ritual activity at the site. Myths from this period portray the temple as a functioning monastery guarded by spiritual beings such as nāgas and devas.

Modern scholarship indicates that the religious transformation of Angkor Wat took place over several centuries and involved gradual structural and ritual modifications. These developments reflect the sustained influence of Buddhist practices, beliefs, and myths on the interpretation of the monument.

The role of Buddhism in shaping both popular and scholarly understandings of Angkor Wat remains significant. The monument is widely regarded as a symbol of the country's Buddhist heritage and continues to feature prominently in contemporary cultural and religious identity.

== Tourism ==
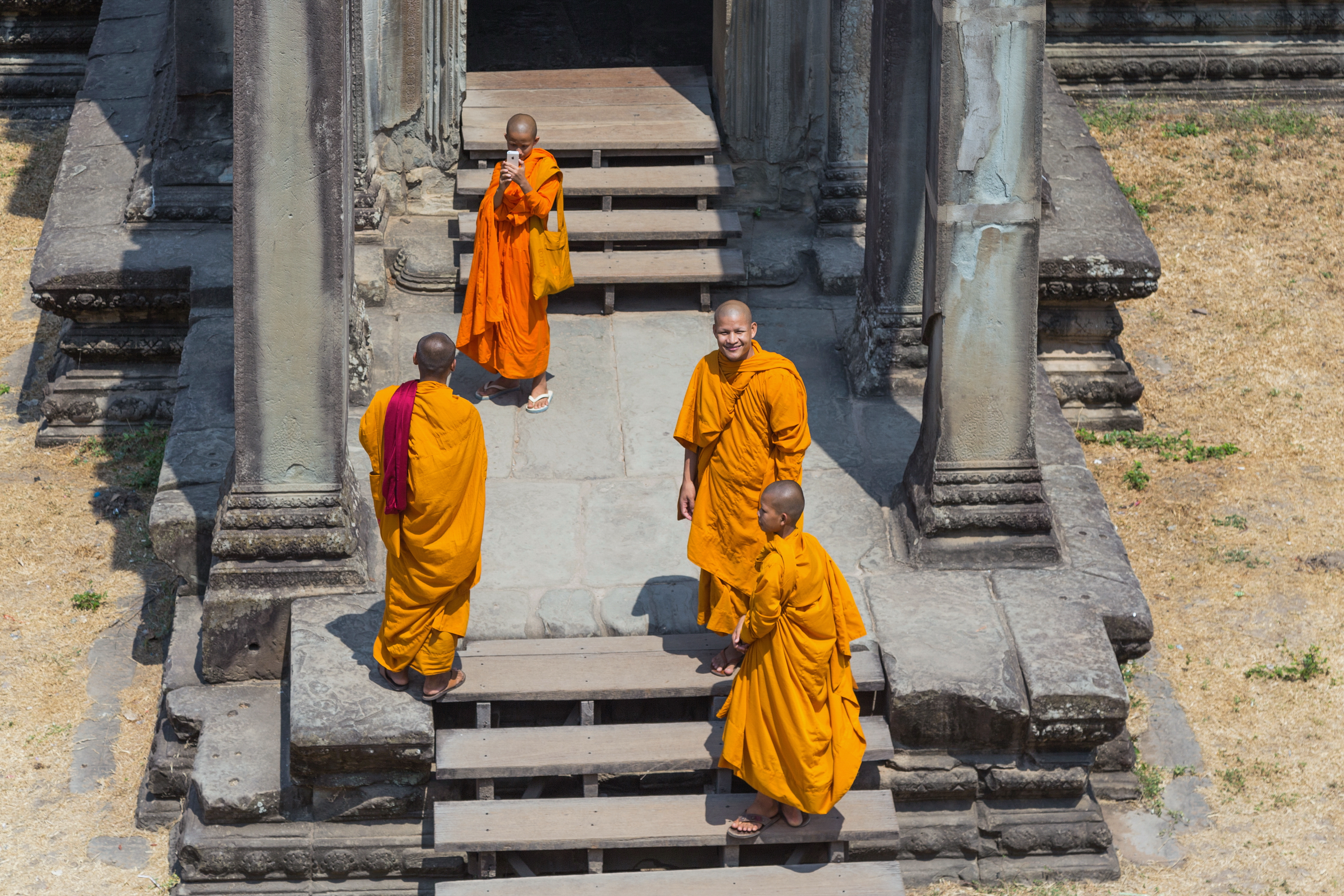
Buddhist monks at Angkor Wat

Since the 1990s, Angkor Wat has become a major tourist destination. In 1993, there were only 7,650 visitors to the site and by 2004, government figures show that 561,000 foreign visitors had arrived in Siem Reap province that year, approximately 50% of all foreign tourists in Cambodia. The number reached over a million in 2007 and over two million by 2012. Angkor Wat received over two million foreign tourists in 2013 and 2.6 million by 2018.

The site was managed by SOKIMEX between 1990 and 2016, which rented it from the Cambodian government. The influx of tourists has caused damage such as graffiti on the walls. Ropes and wooden steps have been introduced to protect the bas-reliefs and floors, respectively. Tourism has also provided some additional funds for maintenance — as of 2000 approximately 28% of ticket revenues across the entire Angkor site was spent on the temples — although most work is carried out by teams sponsored by foreign governments rather than by the Cambodian authorities.

Since Angkor Wat has seen significant growth in tourism throughout the years, UNESCO and its International Co-ordinating Committee for the Safeguarding and Development of the Historic Site of Angkor (ICC), in association with representatives from the Royal Government and APSARA, organised seminars to discuss the concept of "cultural tourism", emphasising the importance of providing high-quality accommodation and services to the tourists and for the Cambodian government to benefit economically, while also incorporating and protecting the richness of Cambodian culture. In 2001, this incentive resulted in the concept of the "Angkor Tourist City" which would be developed about traditional Khmer architecture, contain leisure and tourist facilities, and provide luxurious hotels capable of accommodating large numbers of tourists.

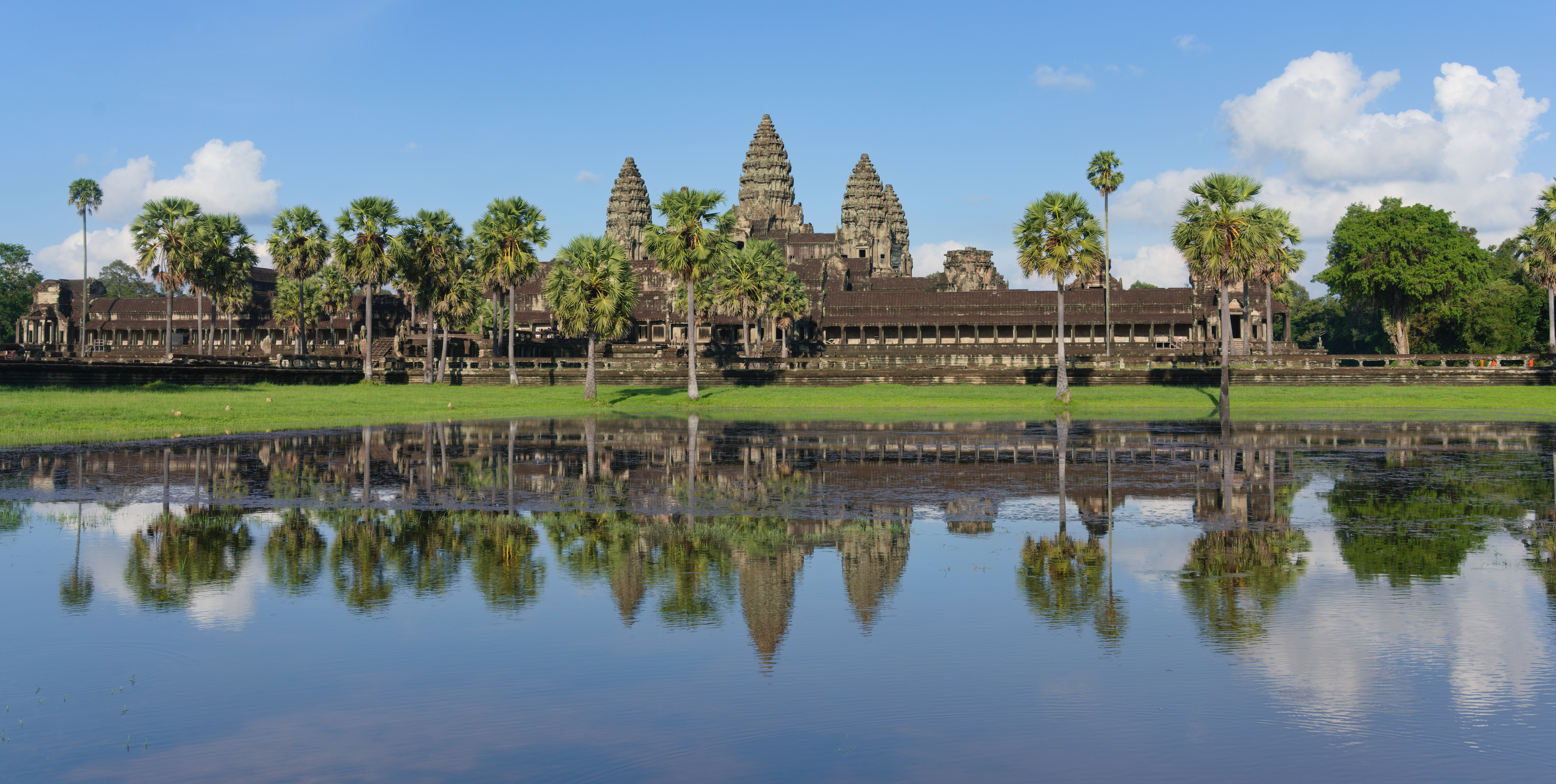
Angkor Wat with its reflection in the outer pool

The prospect of developing such large tourist accommodations has encountered concerns from both APSARA and the ICC, claiming that previous tourism developments in the area have neglected construction regulations and that more of these projects have the potential to damage landscape features. Also, the large scale of these projects have begun to threaten the quality of the nearby town's water, sewage, and electricity systems. It has also been noted that such high frequency of tourism and growing demand for infrastructure has had a direct effect on the underground water table, subsequently straining the structural stability of the temples at Angkor Wat. Locals of Siem Reap have also voiced concern that the atmosphere of their town have been compromised to entertain tourism. Since this local atmosphere is the key component to projects like Angkor Tourist City, the local officials continue to discuss how to successfully incorporate future tourism without sacrificing local values and culture. At the ASEAN Tourism Forum 2012, it was agreed that Borobudur and Angkor Wat would become sister sites and sister provinces.

In 2020, the COVID-19 pandemic in Cambodia led to travel restrictions being introduced across the world, which had a severe impact on Cambodia's tourism sector. As a result, visitors to Angkor Wat greatly diminished, leaving the usually crowded complex almost deserted. Angkor Wat, along with the rest of Cambodia, reopened to international visitors in late 2021, but as of the end of 2022 had only received a fraction of its pre-pandemic traffic: a total of 280,000 tourists visited the complex in 2022, versus 2.6 million in 2018. In 2023, the temple saw an increase in numbers over the previous year, having over 400,000 tourists by late July. Tourists reenacting the 2011 game series Temple Run in mid-2024 for social media have drawn criticism from conservationists who warn that it risks damaging Angkor Wat's structures and carvings and is culturally insensitive. Because of this, the heavy tourism of such a culturally significant site has become increasingly controversial, even pushing critics to advocate for the closing of Angkor Wat as a tourist attraction, as its controversial naming as a World Heritage Site seemed to threaten the lives of nearby native villages and individuals whose heritage relied on Angkor's historical integrity.

== See also ==
- Indosphere
- Greater India
- Buddhism in Cambodia
- Buddhism in Southeast Asia
- Buddhist architecture
- Bayon
- List of Buddhist temples
- List of tallest structures built before the 20th century

== Bibliography ==
- Briggs, Lawrence Robert (1999) [1951]. The Ancient Khmer Empire. White Lotus Companuy. ISBN 978-9-74843-493-3.
- Freeman, Michael; Jacques, Claude (1999). Ancient Angkor. River Books. ISBN 978-0-83480-426-5.
- Glaize, Maurice (1993) [1944]. Les monuments du groupe d'Angkor [Monuments of the Angkor Group]. J. Maisonneuve. ISBN 978-2-72001-091-0.
- Higham, Charles (2001). The Civilization of Angkor. Phoenix. ISBN 978-1-84212-584-7.
- Higham, Charles (2003). Early Cultures of Mainland Southeast Asia. Art Media Resources. ISBN 978-1-58886-028-6.
- Ray, Nick (2002). Lonely Planet guide to Cambodia (4th ed.). ISBN 978-1-74059-111-9.
