= Quarter days =

Four dates in each year

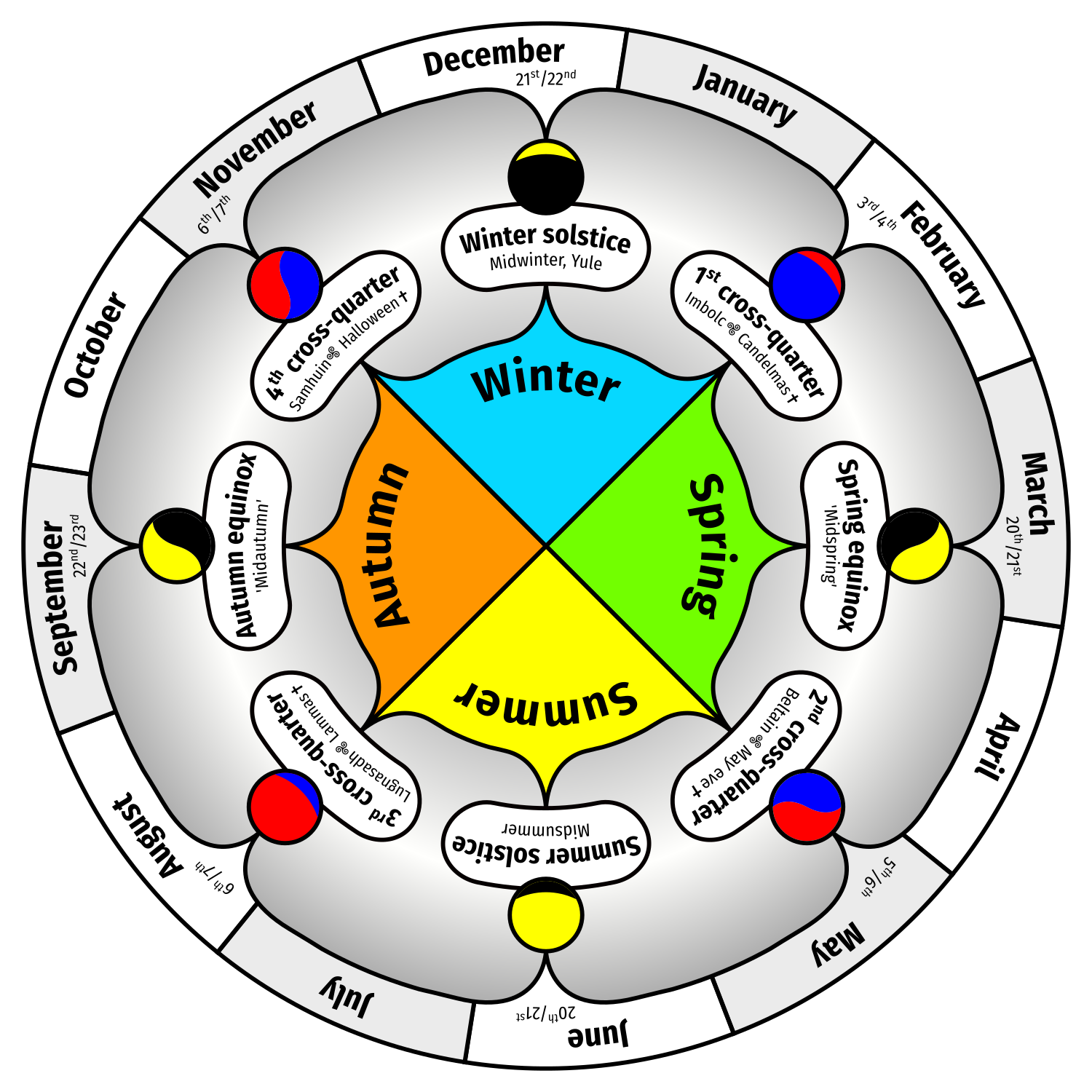
Solar calendar with quarter days and cross-quarter days.

In British and Irish tradition, the quarter days are the four dates in each year on which servants were hired, school terms started, and rents were due. They fell on four religious festivals roughly three months apart and close to the two solstices and two equinoxes.

The significance of quarter days is now limited, although rents for properties in England are often still due on the old English quarter days.

The quarter days have been observed at least since the Middle Ages, and they ensured that debts and unresolved lawsuits were not allowed to linger on. Accounts had to be settled, and a reckoning had to be made and publicly recorded on the quarter days.

== England and Wales ==
Assuming you can remember when Christmas occurs, a useful mnemonic to place the remaining quarter days is to count the letters of the relevant months. Thus, in March, there being five letters, you can know that the quarter day is the 25th. June has four letters and the quarter day is the 24th, and September, having nine letters, has its quarter day on the 29th.

— G. C. M. Young, The Times, 2006

The English quarter days (also observed in Wales and the Channel Islands) are

- Lady Day (25 March, the Feast of the Annunciation);
- Midsummer Day (24 June, the Feast of the Nativity of St John the Baptist);
- Michaelmas Day (29 September, the Feast of St Michael and All Angels); and
- Christmas Day (25 December, the Feast of the Nativity of Jesus).

Falling close to the Spring equinox, Lady Day was the first day of the civil year in England, Wales and the British dominions (but not Scotland) until 1752 (when it was harmonised with the Scottish practice of 1 January being New Year's Day). The British (personal) tax year still ends on "Old" Lady Day (5 April under the 'new style' (Gregorian) calendar, which in the 18th century corresponded to 25 March under the 'old style' Julian calendar: the Calendar (New Style) Act 1750 advanced the calendar by eleven days. 5 April is still the end of the British tax year for personal taxation.

The cross-quarter days are four holidays falling in between the quarter days: Candlemas (2 February), May Day (1 May), Lammas (1 August), and All Hallows (1 November).

At many schools, class terms would begin on the quarter days; for example, the autumn term would start on 29 September, and thus continues to be called the Michaelmas term, especially at more traditional universities.

== Ireland ==
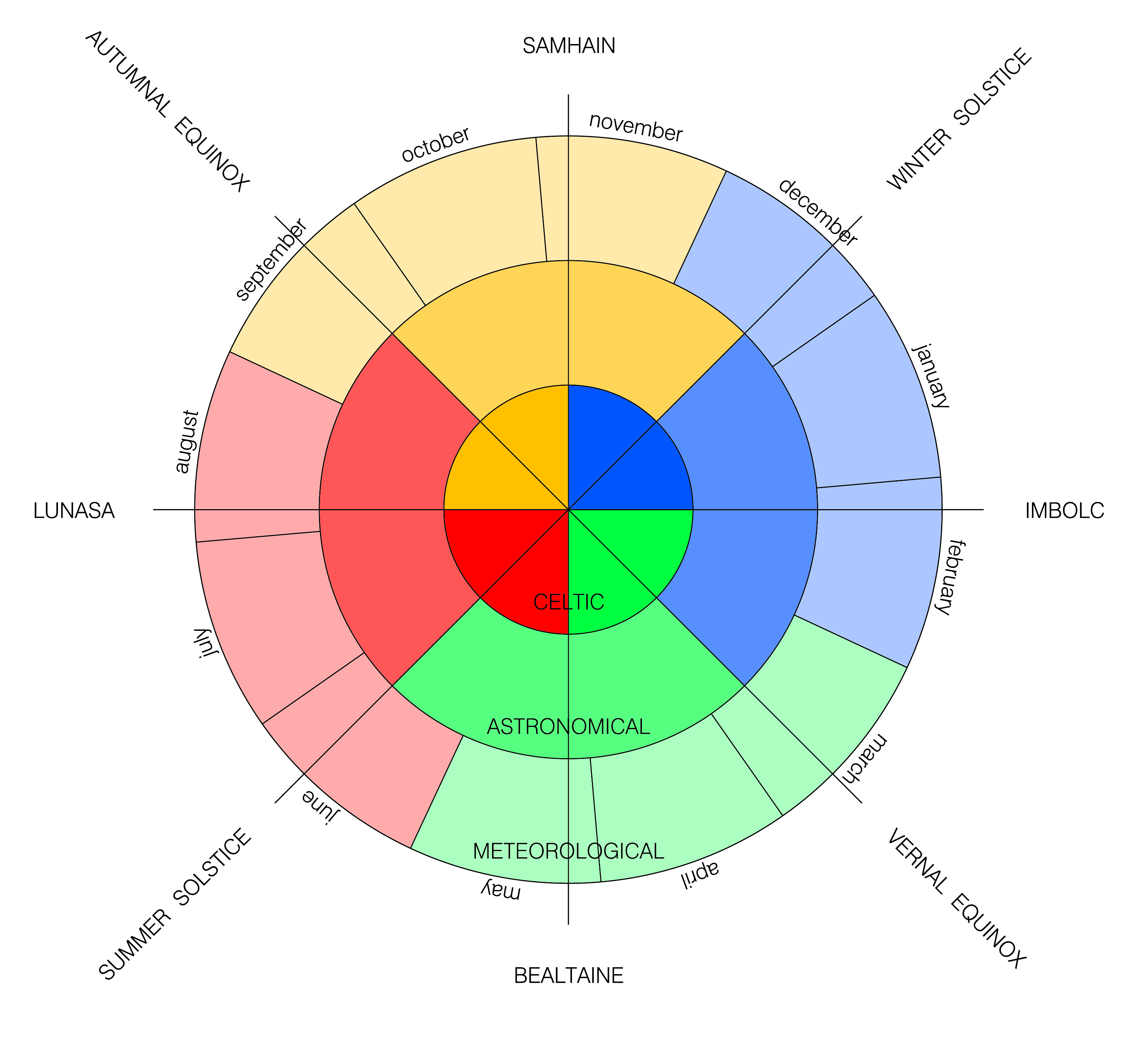
Diagram comparing the Celtic, astronomical and meteorological calendars

Prior to the Christianisation of Ireland in the 5th century AD, the Celtic quarter days were observed; they are now called cross-quarter days since they fall about halfway into each of the English quarters. The names and dates of the cross-quarter days are as follows:

- Candlemas (2 February) – corresponding to Imbolc (St Brigid's Day)
- May Day (1 May) – corresponding to Beltane
- Lammas (1 August) – corresponding to Lughnasadh
- All Hallows (1 November) – corresponding to Samhain

Since 2022, when a holiday for Imbolc was added to the list, all four traditional Celtic quarter days are now marked in the Republic of Ireland by an annual public holiday on a Monday close to the quarter days.

== Scotland ==
The "Old Scottish term days" corresponded approximately to the old Celtic quarter days:

- Candlemas (2 February)
- Whitsunday (legislatively fixed for this purpose as 15 May)
- Lammas (1 August)
- Martinmas (11 November).

These were also the dates of the Quarter Days observed in northern England until the 18th century.

The dates for removals and for the employment of servants of Whitsunday and Martinmas were changed in 1886 to 28 May and 28 November respectively. The Term and Quarter Days (Scotland) Act 1990 redefined the "Scottish term days", in official use, as:

- 28 February,
- 28 May,
- 28 August and
- 28 November.

The Act specifies that the new dates take effect on 13 June 1991 (12 months from the date it was passed). Thus the Scottish term days, as days on which rents are paid, correspond more closely to the cross-quarter days than to the English quarter days.

== In other countries ==
In late 18th century Germany, it was customary for property rentals to start on Easter or one of the quarter days being Midsummer Day, Michaelmas or Christmas.

== See also ==
- Ember days
- Wheel of the Year
- Solar term
