= Martinisingen =

Protestant custom in Germany

Martinisingen (pronounced Martini-zingen; literally "Martin singing" i.e. "St. Martin Song") is an old Protestant custom which is found especially in East Friesland, but also on the Lüneburg Heath and in other parts of Northern and Eastern Germany. It also goes under the names of Martini or Martinssingen and the Low German names of Sünnematten or Mattenherrn (today often erroneously corrupted to Matten Matten Mähren). Martinisingen takes place on 10 November (similar to the Catholic Martinssingen on 11 November) with groups of people carrying their lanterns from house to house and singing traditional songs.

== History ==
Martinisingen is a custom with a mix of several older elements. Traditionally 10 November was the day on which farmhands and ordinary workers were dismissed for the winter. These folk, most of whom had no property, then had to survive the coldest time of the year without any income. However, their children were able to help by going from house to house on this day and begging for food and gifts, especially from the well-to-do farmers and citizens. Originally they collected food that was then actually stored as part of their family's winter stock and could be consumed gradually. Sometimes rather older singers disguised themselves or wore masks (sğabellenskoppen) and joined in.

Later, the gifts given out increasingly became a symbolic donation and, today, usually consist of sweets and fruit. The traditional gifts, by contrast, include gingerbread men (Stutenkerl), honey cakes (Moppen) and Pfeffernüsse (pēpernööten) as well as apples.

The poor folk begged for gifts by reciting rhyming verses or singing suitable songs and the children carried lanterns (kipkapköögels) that used to be made from a beet. Later small pumpkins were occasionally used as well, but gradually, these were replaced by coloured paper lanterns as are common today. Various home-made instruments were also used such as rattles (Rasseln) and friction drums (Rummelpott).

With the outbreak of the Reformation the original motive of begging to supplement winter food supplies became interwoven with religious aspects, particularly those honouring the reformer, Martin Luther, and the festival became the Protestant church's version of the original Catholic tradition. In 1817, on the occasion of the tricentennial anniversary of the Reformation in 1517, Martinisingen was brought forward to the eve of St. Martin's Day. From then on, only Martin Luther continued to be celebrated as the "Friend of light and man of God" (Freund des Lichts und Mann Gottes) who "knocked the crown off the pope in Rome" (der dem Papst in Rom die Krone vom Haupt schlug). For example, St. Martin's Day for Martin of Tours on the 11th was brought forward and combined with Martinisingen on the 10th, the birthday of the Reformer. So, increasingly, the custom of Martinisingen became a celebration of Martin Luther and the motive of begging for food was explained as a tradition of the monastic orders. The traditional songs were given a religious flavour and new ones were written that celebrated the religious significance of the day or honoured Martin Luther.

== Present-day customs ==
Today children go through the suburbs from door to door after the onset of dusk carrying lanterns and singing Martinilieder or St Martin's Eve songs. This is also called Laternelaufen.The light in the lantern is often no longer a candle but electric because, in the November winds, the lanterns often caught fire (hence the verse in the song "Lanterns, Lanterns" which runs "burn up my light, but not my precious lantern"). But, as before the lanterns are often home-made from coloured paper.

About Matten Matten Mären the Hannoversche Wochenblatt weekly paper writes:

There is a hard and fast rule today as there always has been: Whoever gives nothing, will have a prank played on them

so even in East Frisian-North German areas those who do not give anything can expect to have their doorbells rung later on in the evening or other similar "joke"; equally those who do not sing, also get nothing.

Since the end of the 1990s Martinisingen has had competition from Halloween as a result of shop advertising and American television, as well as the enthusiasm of a few teachers in primary schools and kindergartens, but the new festival, apart from discos, has been criticised and largely rejected, according to the newspaper, the Emder Zeitung.

== The best-known Martini song ==
=== Lanterns (Laterne) ===
Ich geh mit meiner Laterne

Start of the chorus:
Ich geh mit meiner Laterne
und meine Laterne mit mir.
Da oben leuchten die Sterne
und unten da leuchten wir.
Verses
1. Ein Lichtermeer zu Martins Ehr
2. Der Martinsmann, der zieht voran
3. Wie schön das klingt, wenn jeder singt
4. Ein Kuchenduft liegt in der Luft
5. Beschenkt uns heut, ihr lieben Leut
6. Laternenlicht, verlösch mir nicht!
7. Mein Licht ist aus, ich geh nach Haus
End of the chorus:

Laterne, Laterne
Laterne, Laterne,
Sonne, Mond und Sterne,
brenne auf mein Licht,
brenne auf mein Licht,
aber nur meine liebe Laterne nicht.

== Sources ==
- Ernst Müller / Griet Voss: De Utrooper's kleines Buch von Martini, ISBN 3-934370-14-4 (Broschüre).
