= Scottish term days =

Divisions of the legal year in Scotland

Scottish term and quarter days mark the four divisions (terms and quarters) of the legal year in Scotland. These were historically used as the days when contracts and leases would begin and end, servants would be hired or dismissed, and rent, interest on loans, and ministers' stipends would become due.

== Description ==
The Term Days are Whitsunday and Martinmas, and together with Candlemas and Lammas they constitute the Quarter Days. These originally occurred on Christian holy days, corresponding roughly to old quarter days used in both Scotland and Ireland, with White Sunday or Whitsun occurring at the Easter Pentecost and thus moving around. These were mapped from the Julian to the Gregorian calendar and fixed in 1886 as 28 February, 28 May, 28 August and 28 November, and then later ratified by the Term and Quarter Days (Scotland) Act 1990.

== Pre-1886 ==
The Old Scottish Term and Quarter Days (Julian to Gregorian):

- Candlemas (2 February)
- Whitsunday (15 May)
- Lammas (1 August)
- Martinmas (11 November)

== Post-1886 ==
The new Scottish Term and Quarter Days (Gregorian post-1886):

- 28 February
- 28 May
- 28 August
- 28 November

== History ==
Candlemas originally fell on 2 February, the day of the feast of the Purification, or the Presentation of Christ. This was celebrated in pre-Reformation times by candlelit processions. The tradition was started in the 5th century during the Roman celebration of Februa, and carried over into Scotland, where mothers of children born the previous year would march with candles, hoping to be purified by the Virgin Mary.

Whitsun was originally the feast of Pentecost, around which a great many christenings would occur, so it became associated with the colour white. Because the date of Pentecost moves each year, the legal Term Day of Whitsunday (not to be confused with the church festival) was fixed in Scotland as 26 May in the Julian Calendar, which became 15 May under the Gregorian Calendar, adopted in Scotland in 1599.

Lammas was celebrated on 1 August, the day the first fruits of the harvest were offered, the name coming from the Anglo-Saxon for 'loaf-mass' or 'bread-feast'.

Martinmas, on 11 November, was originally the feast of Saint Martin of Tours, a 4th-century bishop and hermit.

In Scotland, 1886 saw the term dates for removals and the hiring of servants in towns changed to 28 February, 28 May, 28 August and 28 November. The original dates are now referred to as Old Scottish Term Days. The dates were regularised by the Term and Quarter Days (Scotland) Act 1990.

== Modern use ==
The usage of term days is now most common in leases of farmland and less frequently with other leases. Other references to them tend to be historical or ceremonial.

The College of Justice (supreme courts of Scotland) no longer uses the term or quarter days to determine the terms of the Court of Session or High Court, instead dividing the legal year into winter (late September to last Friday before Christmas), spring (early January to late March) and summer (late April to early July) terms.

In the ancient universities, the academic terms were named after Martinmas, Candlemas and Whitsun, and at the University of St Andrews the two semesters continue to be named Martinmas and Candlemas.

== See also ==
- Quarter Days
