= Shoot (botany) =

Young stem or branch

In botany, a plant shoot consists of any plant stem together with its appendages like leaves, lateral buds, flowering stems, and flower buds. The new growth from seed germination that grows upward is a shoot where leaves will develop. In the spring, perennial plant shoots are the new growth that grows from the ground in herbaceous plants or the new stem or flower growth that grows on woody plants.

In everyday speech, shoots are often synonymous with stems. Stems, which are an integral component of shoots, provide an axis for buds, fruits, and leaves.

Young shoots are often eaten by animals because the fibers in the new growth have not yet completed secondary cell wall development, making the young shoots softer and easier to chew and digest. As shoots grow and age, the cells develop secondary cell walls that have a hard and tough structure. Some plants (e.g. bracken) produce toxins that make their shoots inedible or less palatable.

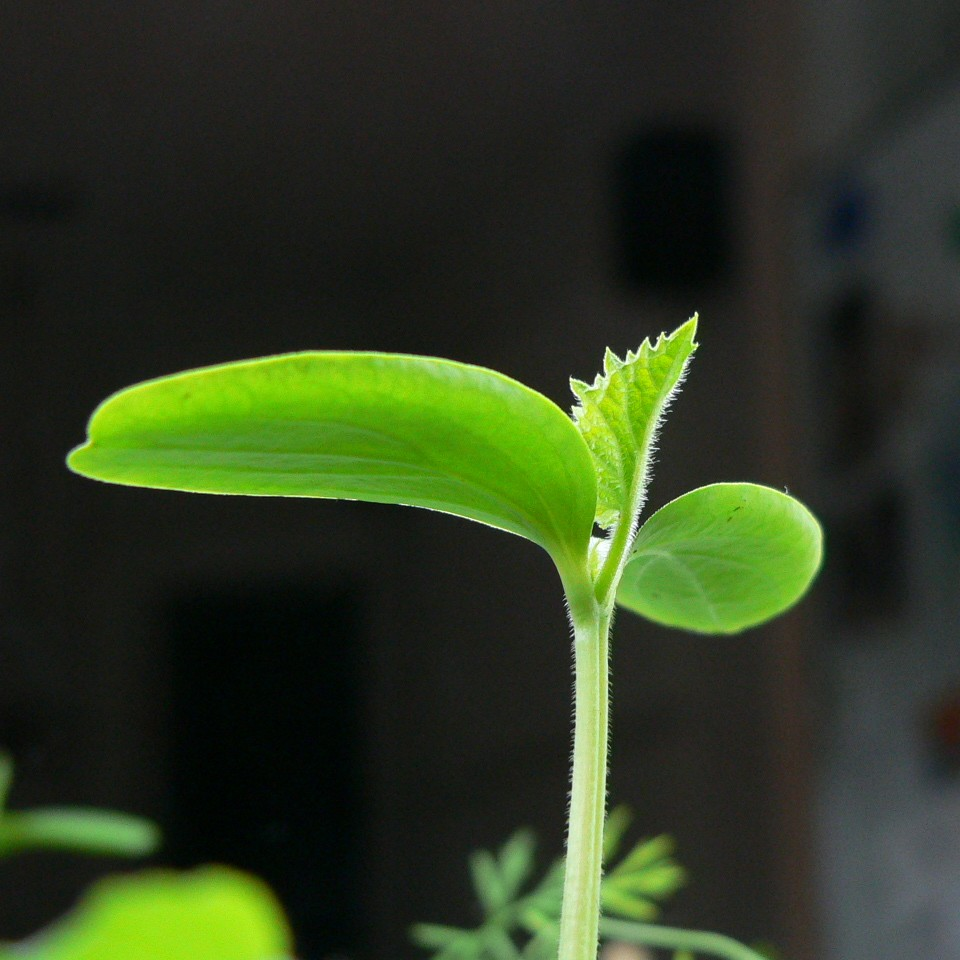
The shoot of a cucumber

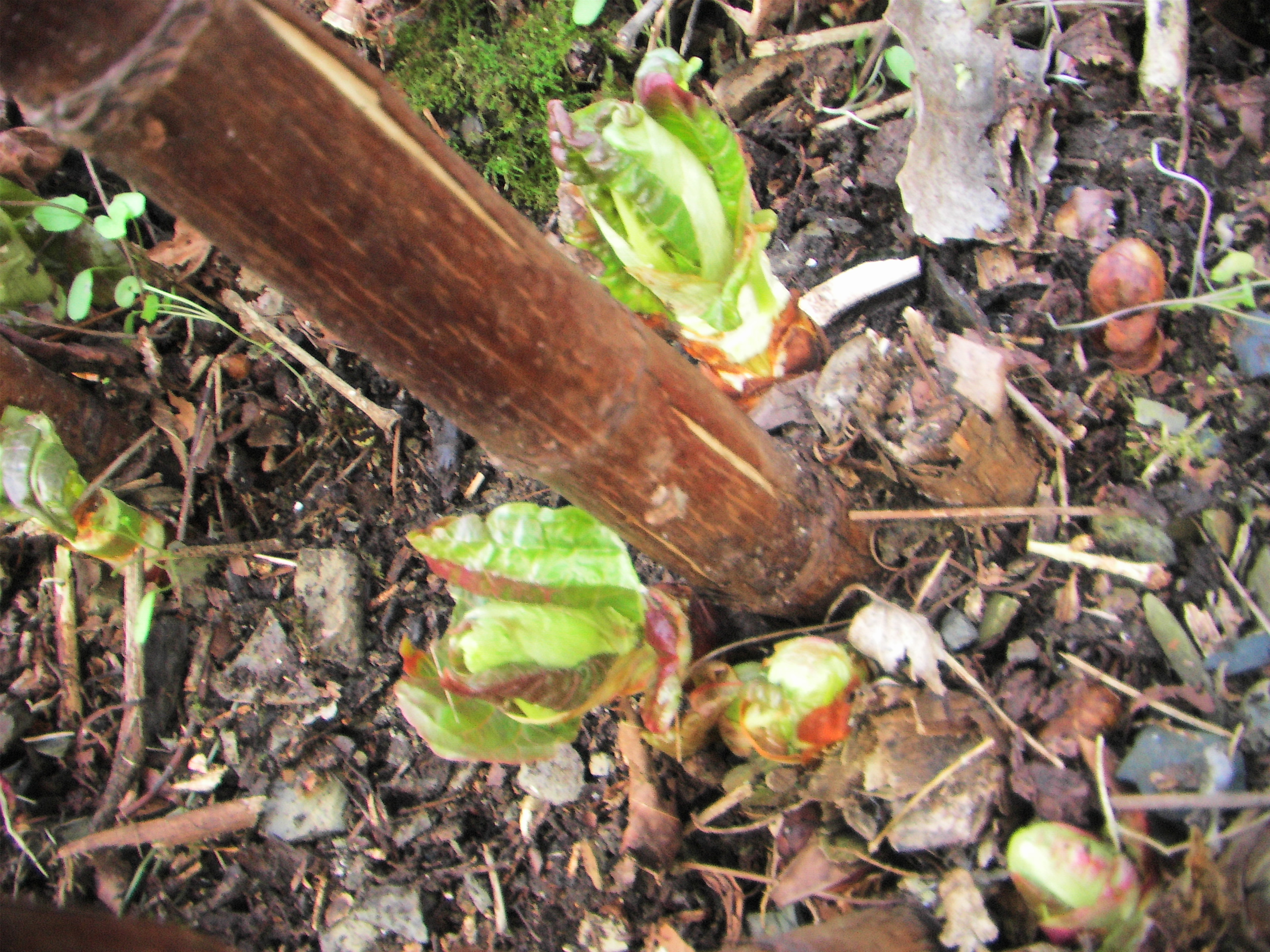
Edible shoots of Sachaline

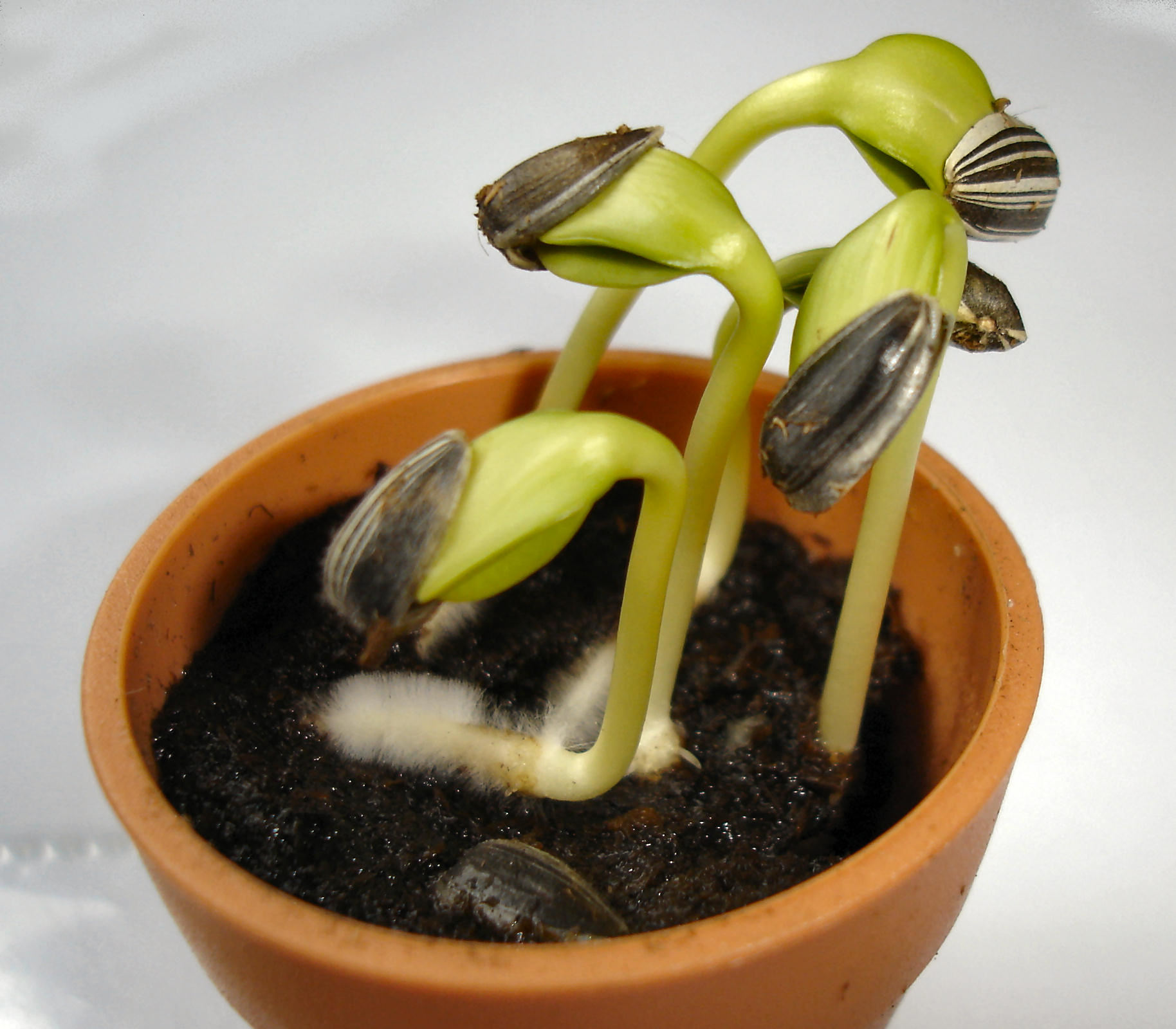
Sunflower seedlings germinate

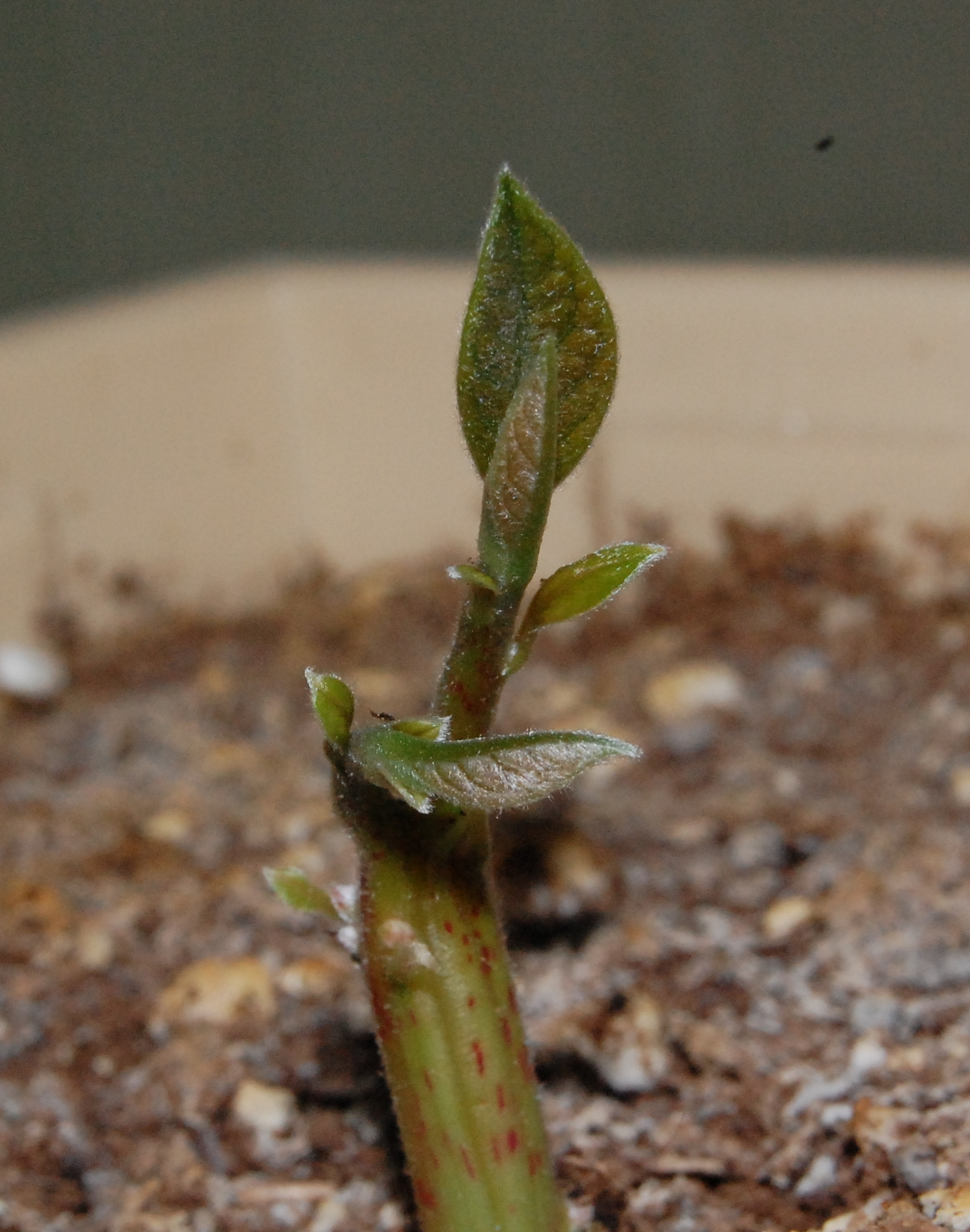
A young hass avocado shoot

== Shoot types of woody plants ==
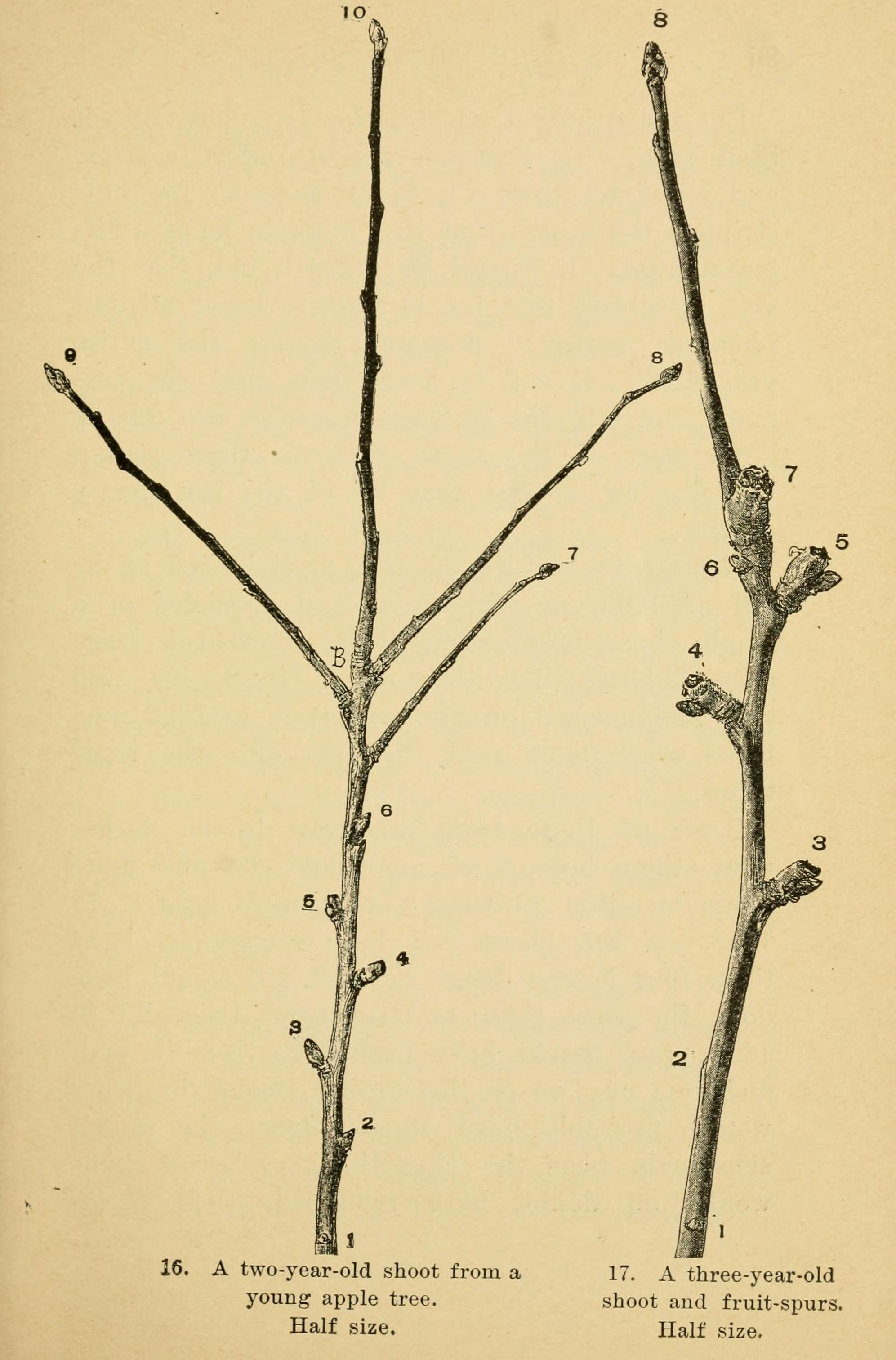
Development of fruiting spurs on an apple tree. Left: A two-year-old shoot; Right: A three-year-old shoot with fruit spurs

Many woody plants have distinct short shoots and long shoots. In some angiosperms, the short shoots, also called spur shoots or fruit spurs, produce the majority of flowers and fruit. A similar pattern occurs in some conifers and in Ginkgo, although the "short shoots" of some genera such as Picea are so small that they can be mistaken for part of the leaf that they have produced.

A related phenomenon is seasonal heterophylly, which involves visibly different leaves from spring growth and later lammas growth. Whereas spring growth mostly comes from buds formed the previous season, and often includes flowers, lammas growth often involves long shoots.

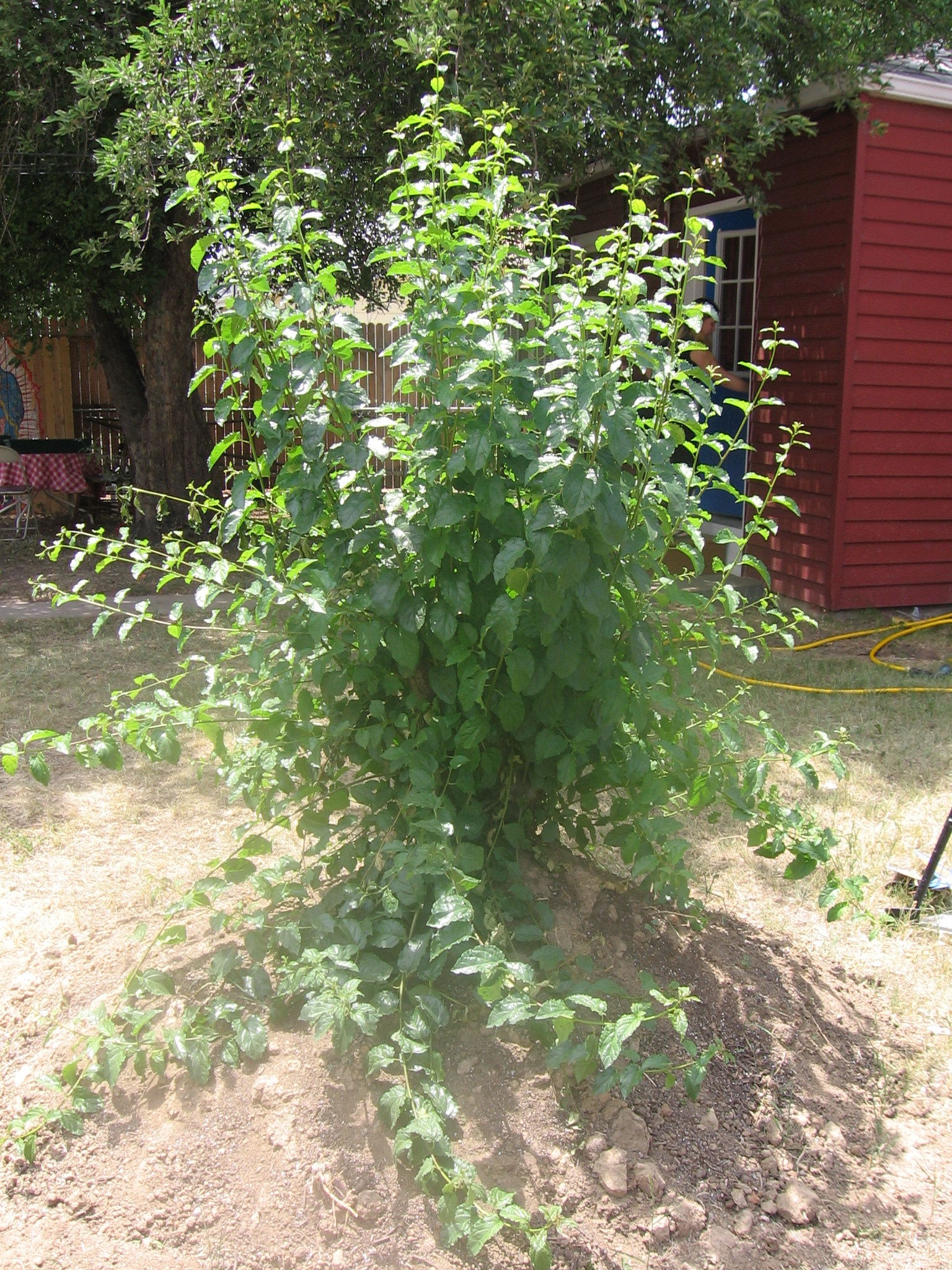
Long shoot growth

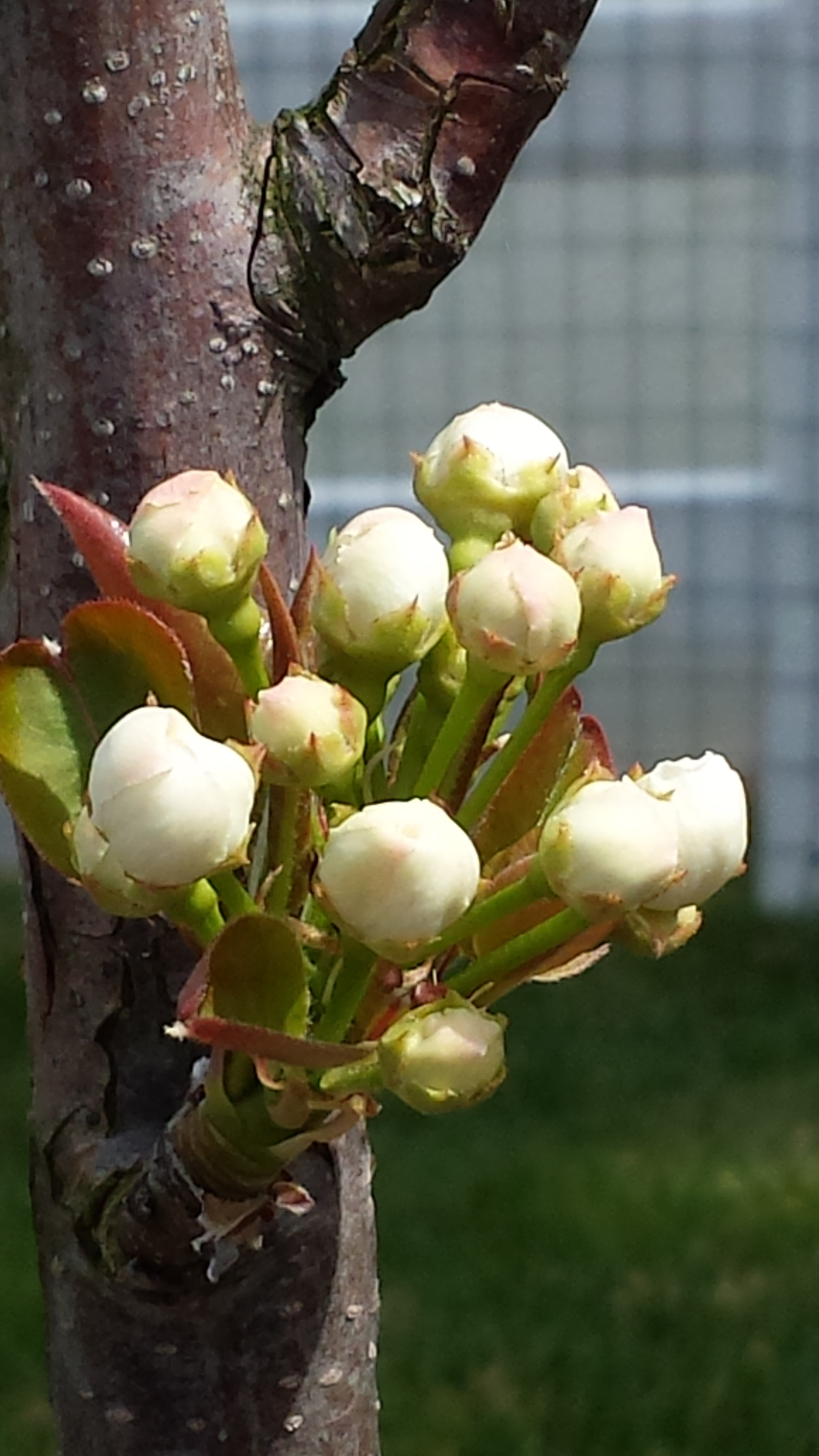
A mature fruiting spur on a Nashi pear tree, Pyrus pyrifolia

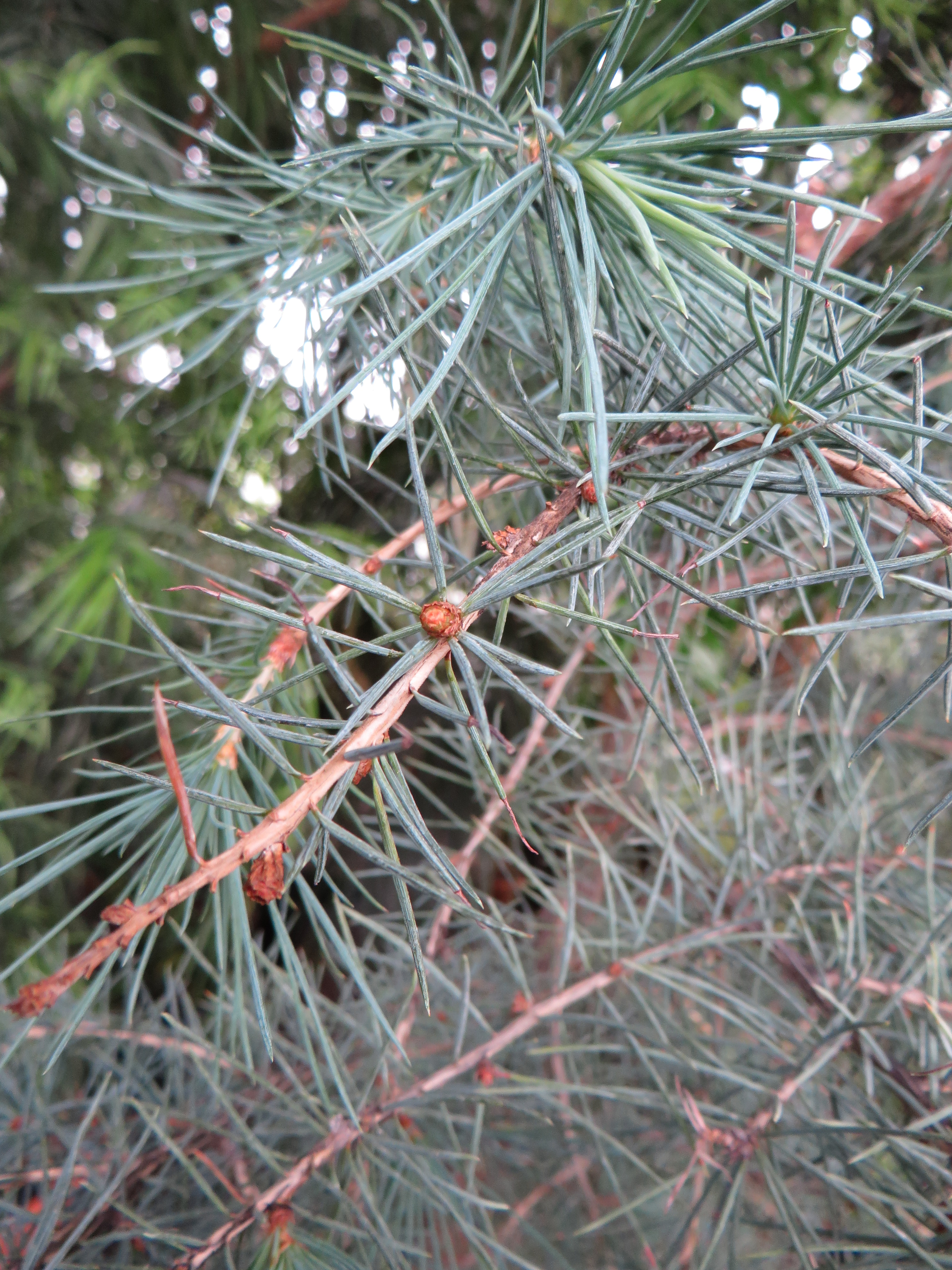
On long shoots of Cedrus deodara individual leaves may have buds in the axils.

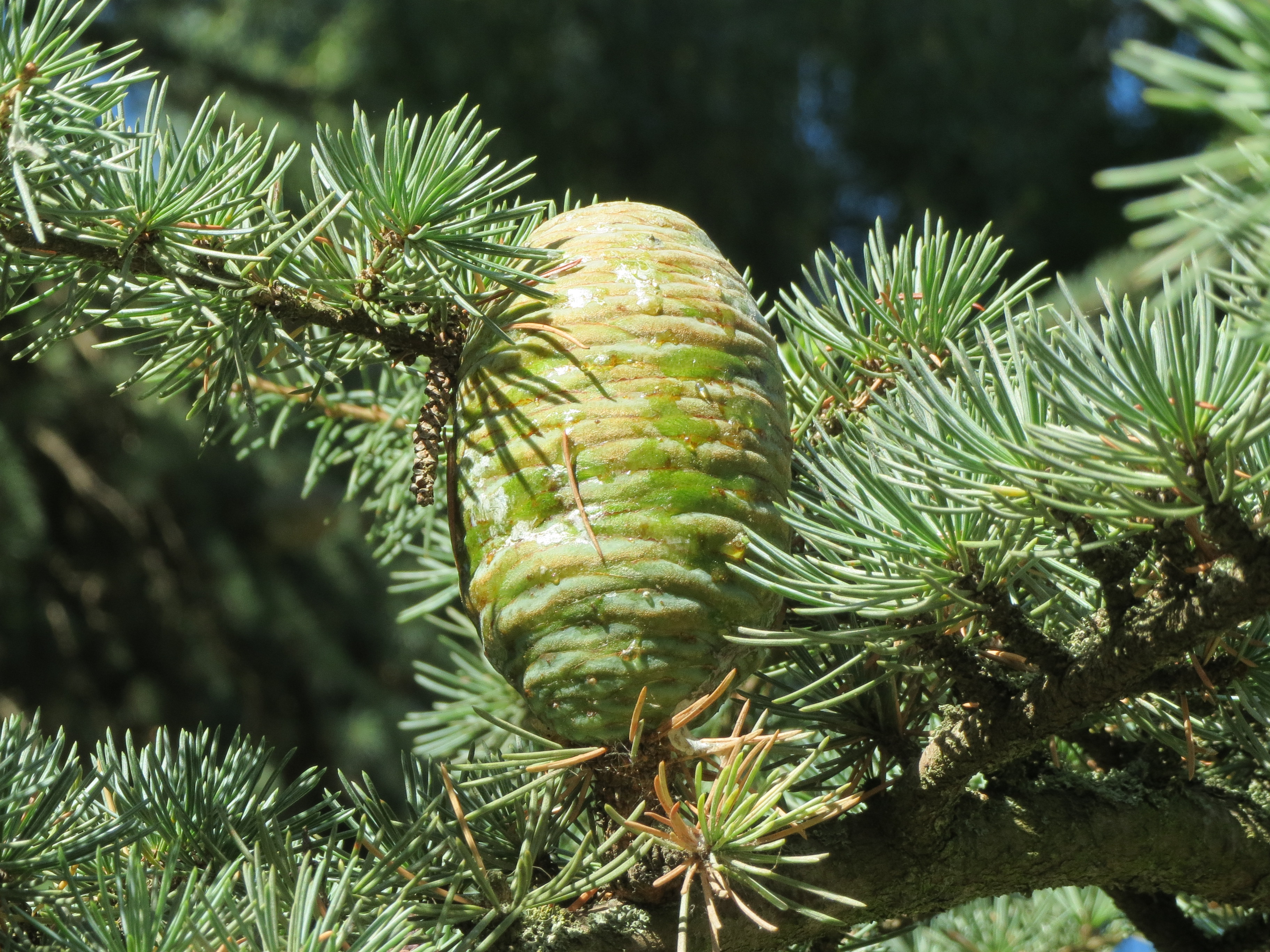
Cedrus deodara forms short shoots (from buds) along the long shoots.

== Shoot apical meristem ==
The shoot apical meristem is the tiny growing tip at the very top of a plant's shoot. It is made of small, constantly dividing cells that act like a "factory" for creating all new above-ground parts of the plant. The tunica-corpus model, first proposed by Schmidt in 1924, describes the organization of the shoot apical meristem into two structurally and functionally distinct regions based on the orientation of cell division. The tunica consists of the outer one or two cell layers (commonly referred to as L1 and L2), where cells predominantly divide anticlinally–perpendicular to the surface-thereby maintaining a continuous surface layer. Beneath the tunica lies the corpus, an inner mass of cells (L3 and deeper layers) that divide in multiple planes, including both anticlinal and periclinal orientations, contributing to the internal bulk and volume of the meristem^{[3]} . Cells in the tunica divide mainly anticlinally to maintain a smooth outer surface and give rise to the epidermis of emerging leaves and stems. In contrast, the corpus contains cells that divide in multiple planes, contributing to the internal tissues and overall bulk of the growing shoot. Together, the tunica and corpus generate the continuous formation of new organs and tissues, allowing the shoot to elongate and produce leaves, branches, and reproductive structures.

=== Functions of the shoot apical meristem ===
The shoot apical meristem performs two major functions: maintaining a self-renewing pool of stem cells at the center of the apex and generating new lateral organs from its flanks. These functions depend on the coordinated activity of its structural regions- the central zone, peripheral zone, and rib meristem-and on the layered organization described by the tunica- corpus model. Recent research has shown that these developmental roles are regulated by interacting hormone gradients and transcription factors within the meristem. According to Shani, Yanai and Ori (2006), high cytokinin activity in the central zone, promoted by KNOXI and WUSCHEL proteins, supports meristem maintenance and indeterminate growth. In contrast, elevated auxin and gibberellin levels at the periphery specify the P0 region, where lateral organs are initiated. These opposing hormonal domains create stable boundaries between the tunica and corpus regions and between the meristem center and emerging primordia, allowing the shoot apical meristem to continuously balance self-renewal with organ production.

=== Zones of the shoot apical meristem ===
The shoot apical meristem is divided into zones. The central zone contains slowly dividing stem cells that maintain the meristem. Surrounding it, the peripheral zone has faster-dividing cells that give rise to leaf primordia and new lateral organs. Beneath these regions lies the rib zone, where cells divide and expand to contribute to the internal tissues of the stem. Together, these zones coordinate growth, organ initiation, and stem cell maintenance. The division of cells could primarily be compared to that of human bones, if someone breaks a bone in their body, that bone starts dividing at the place of repture because of the compound Calcium. Just like when a human being grows tall and the bone cells starts multiplying, the cells in a plant shoots also start dividing to facilitate physical growth. Even the human bone has zones such as the middle and the top section which divide cells differently like in the case of plants.

=== Hormonal regulation ===
Hormonal regulation of plant meristems involves an integrated network of signaling pathways that coordinate cell division, differentiation, and tissue patterning. Studies in Arabidopsis and other model species show that no single hormone acts in isolation; instead, developmental outcomes emerge from extensive cross-talk between auxin, cytokinin, gibberellins, ethylene, abscisic acid, and brassinosteroids.

Auxin plays a central role in pattern formation at both shoot and root apices. In the root apical meristem, auxin forms a stable concentration gradient maintained by coordinated activity of AUX/LAX influx carriers, PIN efflux proteins, and ABC transporters. This gradient specifies the position of the stem-cell niche and regulates the dosage-dependent activity of PLETHORA (PLT) transcription factors, which control stem-cell identity, mitotic activity, and differentiation.

Cytokinin acts largely antagonistically to auxin. In the root meristem, cytokinin promotes the transition of cells from division to differentiation, thereby influencing meristem size. Cytokinin signaling also contributes to vascular pattern formation and early embryonic establishment of the stem-cell region. Several studies show that auxin induces negative regulators of cytokinin signaling (such as ARR7 and ARR15), providing a molecular basis for auxin–cytokinin antagonism.

Ethylene interacts with auxin to regulate root elongation and stem-cell behavior. Ethylene stimulates auxin biosynthesis and enhances the expression of auxin transport components, leading to higher auxin accumulation in the elongation zone and reduced cell expansion. Ethylene also modulates quiescent-center division, linking hormonal signaling with maintenance of stem-cell quiescence.

Gibberellins regulate root growth primarily by controlling cell expansion. Their signaling promotes degradation of DELLA proteins, which act as growth repressors. Auxin promotes GA-induced DELLA destabilization, whereas ethylene and abscisic acid stabilize DELLA proteins, illustrating a multi-directional regulatory interface among these pathways.

Brassinosteroids influence both meristematic cell division and elongation. Optimal brassinosteroid levels are required for proper auxin responsiveness, and brassinosteroid-deficient mutants show reduced meristem size and impaired auxin-induced transcriptional responses. Brassinosteroids also stimulate ethylene biosynthesis, adding an additional layer of interaction among hormonal pathways.

Abscisic acid (ABA) contributes to root meristem organization and integrates environmental stress signals with developmental responses. ABA affects sensitivity of meristematic cells, interacts with ethylene signaling components, and influences DELLA protein stability during stress conditions.

Collectively, hormonal regulation of meristems is achieved through a dynamic network in which hormones modulate each other’s biosynthesis, transport, and downstream gene expression. These interactions ensure that meristem activity is tightly coordinated with developmental stage and environmental inputs.

== Shoot development apical dominance ==
Apical dominance is the control exerted by the apical portions of the shoot over the outgrowth of the lateral buds. The very top of the plant (the shoot apex) produces a hormone called auxin, which moves downward through the stem. As long as auxin is coming from the tip, the side buds stay small and do not grow into branches. Evidence from hormonal studies suggests that apically produced auxin indirectly suppresses axillary bud outgrowth that is promoted by cytokinin originating from roots/shoots. Significant involvement with other hormones, although less likely, has not been ruled out.

== Environmental influences on shoot growth ==
Shoot growth is strongly shaped by environmental factors which influence the direction, rate, and pattern of development. These responses help the plant optimize access to resources such as light, water, and nutrients.

=== Light (Phototropism) ===
Shoots commonly exhibit positive phototropism, bending toward a light source. This response is regulated by uneven distribution of auxin along the shoot: cells on the shaded side elongate more rapidly than those on the illuminated side, causing the shoot to curve toward the light. Phototropism allows leaves to maximize light capture for photosynthesis.

=== Gravity (Gravitropism) ===
Shoots also respond to gravity through negative gravitropism, growing upward regardless of the plant’s orientation. Specialized cells called statocytes detect the direction of gravity. Auxin redistribution triggers greater elongation on the lower side of the shoot, lifting the growing tip upward. This ensures stable vertical growth and proper positioning of foliage.

=== Temperature ===
Temperature influences both the rate of cell division at the shoot apical meristem and the elongation of internodes. Warm temperatures often accelerate shoot expansion, while low temperatures can slow metabolic activity and reduce growth. Some species exhibit thermomorphogenesis, a growth pattern where high temperatures promote elongated stems and more widely spaced leaves. Temperature changes also facilitate opening and closing of stomatal pores which decreases productivity/growth when the pores are closed and opening of it enables photosynthesis further enriching the plant with energy.

=== Water availability and stress ===
Drought stress typically reduces shoot growth by lowering turgor pressure, slowing cell expansion, and increasing abscisic acid (ABA) levels. ABA helps maintain water balance but also suppresses growth at the shoot apex. In contrast, abundant water promotes faster internode elongation and leaf expansion. Environmental stressors such as wind or mechanical disturbance can also induce a growth response where shoots become shorter and thicker, increasing structural stability.

== Shoot-stem distinction ==
A shoot is a broader structure that includes the stem and all the organs attached to it, while a stem is only one component of the shoot. A shoot consists of the stem, Leaves, flower buds, young branches, and Leaf primordia.

A stem is the central axis of the shoot. It provides structural support and houses vascular tissues that transport water, minerals, and sugars between the roots and the aerial parts of the plant.

== See also ==
- Bud
- Crown (botany)
- Heteroblasty, an abrupt change in the growth pattern of some plants as they mature
- Lateral shoot
- Phyllotaxis, the arrangement of leaves along a plant stem
- Seedling
- Sterigma, the "woody peg" below the leaf of some conifers
- Thorn (botany), true thorns, as distinct from spines or prickles, are short shoots
