= Lateral shoot =

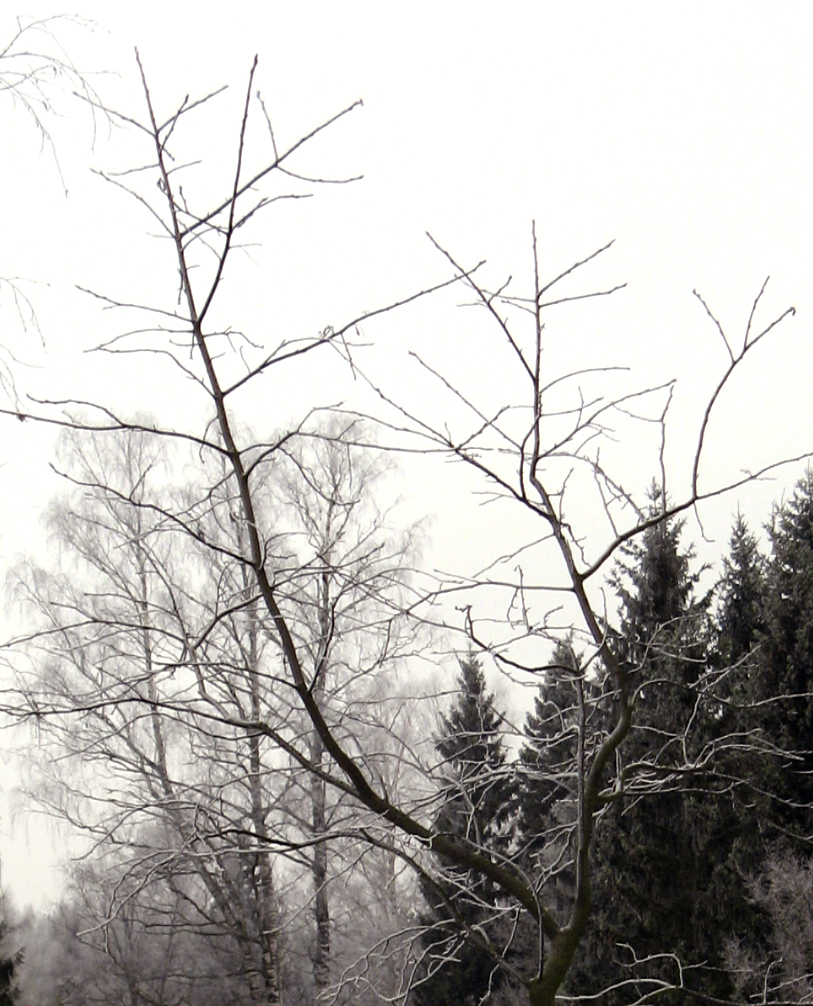
Lateral shoots/branches are often numerous on larger vegetation such as certain trees or bushes.

A lateral shoot, commonly known as a branch, is a part of a plant's shoot system that develops from axillary buds on the stem's surface, extending laterally from the plant's stem.

== Importance to photosynthesis ==
As a plant grows it requires more energy, it also is required to out-compete nearby plants for this energy. One of the ways a plant can compete for this energy is to increase its height, another is to increase its overall surface area. That is to say, the more lateral shoots a plant develops, the more foliage the plant can support increases how much photosynthesis the plant can perform as it allows for more area for the plant to uptake carbon dioxide as well as sunlight.

== Genes, transcription factors, and growth ==
Through testing with Arabidopsis thaliana (A plant considered a model organism for plant genetic studies) genes including MAX1 and MAX2 have been found to affect growth of lateral shoots. Gene knockouts of these genes cause abnormal proliferation of the plants affected, implying they are used for repressing said growth in wild type plants. Another set of experiments with Arabidopsis thaliana testing genes in the plant hormone florigen, two genes FT and TSF (which are abbreviations for Flowering Locus T, and Twin Sister of FT) when knocked out, appear to affect lateral shoot in a negative fashion. These mutants cause slower growth and improper formation of lateral shoots, which could also mean that lateral shoots are important to florigen's function. Along with general growth there are also transcription factors that directly effect the production of additional lateral shoots like the TCP family (also known as Teosinte branched 1/cycloidea/proliferating cell factor) which are plant specific proteins that suppress lateral shoot branching. Additionally the TCP family has been found to be partially responsible for inhibiting the cell's Growth hormone–releasing hormone (GHRF) which means it also inhibits cell proliferation.

== See also ==
- Apical dominance
- Shoot apical meristem
- Auxin, another plant growth hormone
- Cell growth
