= Laternelaufen =

German tradition at St. Martin's Day

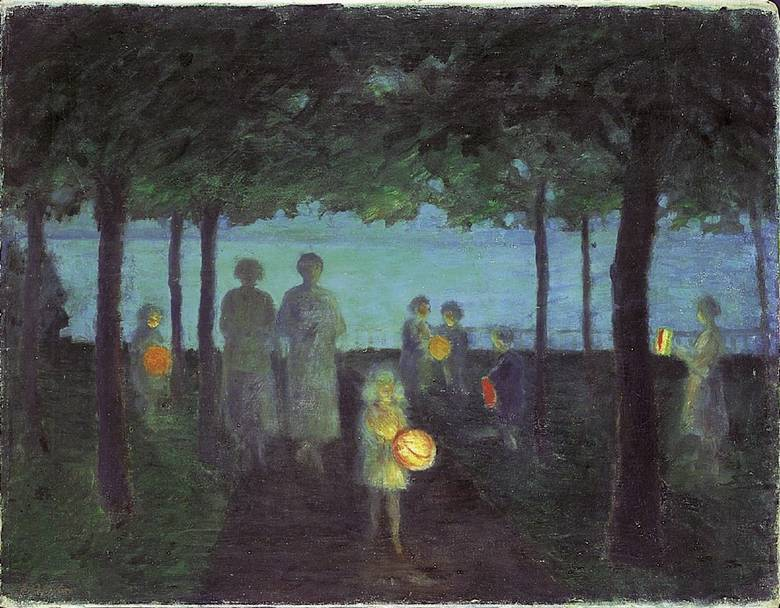
Evening on the Baltic Sea, painting by Ernst Oppler (c. 1920)

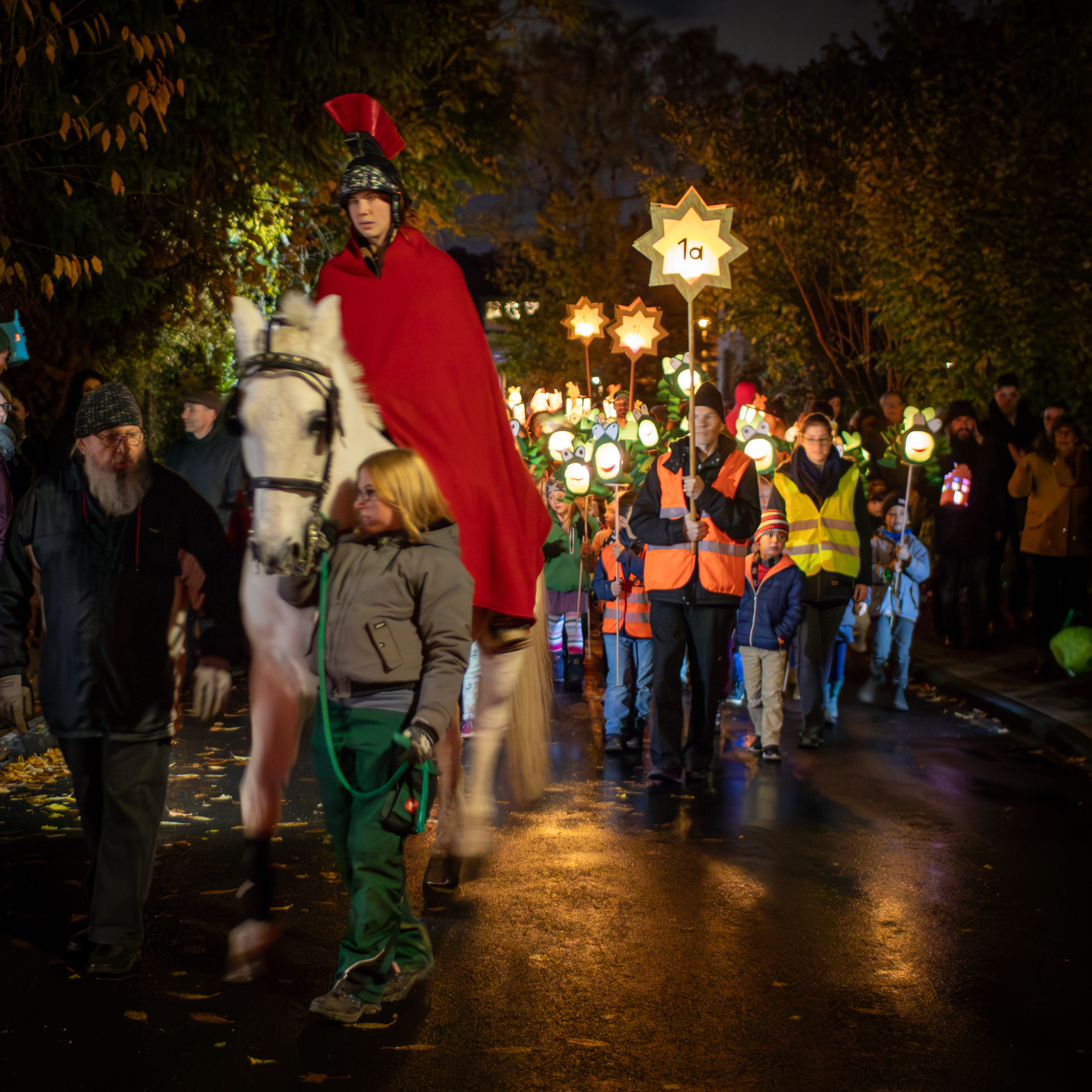
St. Martin's Day procession in Cologne (2017)

Laternelaufen pronounced [laˈtɛʁnəˌlaʊ̯fn̩] ('Walking with Lanterns') is a German tradition held on or around St. Martin's Day on 11 November. Children (usually in kindergarten and elementary school, ages 5 to 12 years) walk along the streets in the early evening or after nightfall, holding colourful, often self-made lanterns while singing traditional songs (Laternenumzug, 'Lantern Pageant').

== Memorial to St. Martin ==
Legend has it that the fourth-century St. Martin, while a Roman cavalry soldier, cut his cloak in two and gave a beggar clothed in rags half of it to protect the man from freezing to death. Afterwards St. Martin became the bishop of Tours and continued to help poor people. While this story is commonly known among German children and told in connection with this tradition, it does not explain the custom of promenading along the streets with lanterns. Several reasons why it is done this way can be found (s. Origin of the Tradition).

While Laternelaufen is a memorial to St. Martin of Tours and therefore usually takes place on 11 November, his feast day, in some regions of Germany that are more Protestant it may occur on 10 November because it is influenced by the celebration of Martin Luther's birthday (Martinisingen). In some areas there is no fixed day. Depending on the needs of the particular organizers, celebrations can often happen on different days in the same city. In Catholic regions Laternelaufen is also called Sankt Martinsumzug ('Saint Martin's Pageant') focusing on the aspect of sharing. In Austria, the same tradition is called Laternenfest.

During Laternelaufen children often sing Martinslieder or Martinilieder ('Martin songs') that glorify St. Martin's act of sharing or songs about their lanterns.

== Origin ==
It is not obvious why the stories concerning St. Martin led to the custom of Laternelaufen. Like the tradition of the Advent wreath, Laternelaufen may symbolise the act of 'bringing light into the world'. It is also possible that one tradition got conflated with another, or that the lanterns are remnants of a custom arising from the lessening of daylight in autumn and winter. Festivals of light (a category into which Laternelaufen could be classified) are celebrated in many cultures and traditions around the world (e.g., Chanukka, Saint Lucy's Day, Diwali, and Loi Krathong).

== Organization ==
A contemporary Laternelaufen is usually organized by parents, kindergartens and schools, parishes, or even political parties. The way often leads through forests (if any are available in the neighbourhood), because there the presence of streetlights is reduced so that the lanterns are the only source of light. The procession is accompanied by parents, group leaders, and other adults. For official pageants, the organizers often hire somebody to play St. Martin, costumed as a Roman soldier in uniform wearing a long red cape or cloak, often riding on a horse in front of the children on foot.
