= Term and Quarter Days (Scotland) Act 1990 =

Act of the Parliament of the United Kingdom

Term and Quarter Days (Scotland) Act 1990 (Note: Section 3(1).)
- Act of Parliament
- Parliament of the United Kingdom
- Long title: An Act to regulate, in relation to Scotland, the dates of Whitsunday, Martinmas, Candlemas and Lammas; and for connected purposes.
- Citation: 1990 c. 22
- Territorial extent: Scotland (Note: Section 3(4).)

Dates
- Royal assent: 13 July 1990
- Commencement: 13 July 1990 (sections 1(5), 1(6) and 3); 13 July 1991 (remaining provisions); (Note: Section 3(2).)
Other legislation
Repeals/revokes	Removings Act 1693

Status: Current legislation

Text of statute as originally enacted

Revised text of statute as amended

Text of the Term and Quarter Days (Scotland) Act 1990 as in force today (including any amendments) within the United Kingdom, from legislation.gov.uk.

The Term and Quarter Days (Scotland) Act 1990 (c. 22) is an act of the Parliament of the United Kingdom which defined the dates of the Scottish Term and Quarter Days. These are customary divisions of the legal year when contracts traditionally begin and end and payments are due. It received royal assent on 13 July 1990, with the new dates taking effect twelve months later. The changes arose from a Scottish Law Commission Report on the Scottish Term and Quarter Days.

== Provisions ==
Section 1 of the act defines the four quarter days as Candlemas on 28 February, Whitsunday on 28 May, Lammas on 28 August and Martinmas on 28 November, with Whitsunday and Martinmas being the two term days. The act provides that any lease, agreement or undertaking, whether written or oral, which contains a specific or general reference to a term or quarter day, including those concluded before the change, shall be understood as referring to the new definitions of the days (i.e. as 28 February/May/August/November).

Where it was intended in a contract concluded prior to the passing of the act that a reference to a term or quarter day was intended to refer specifically to the previous date of that day rather than the term or quarter day generally, it is possible under subsection (5) to apply to the sheriff within twelve months of the passing of the act to have the reference interpreted in this way. The sheriff's decision in this application is final.

Under subsection (7), where a reference is made to one of the term or quarter days and the date of this day is incorrectly specified in the contract in terms of the act (i.e. not as 28 February/May/August/November), the date actually specified in the contract is to be used rather than that in the act.

Section 2 of the act saves any notice given before that section came into force which refers to one of the days, so that it has effect as if the act had not been passed, and provides that nothing in the act affects any right or obligation enforceable before that time. Section 3 of the act provides the short title, brings the act (except section 1(5) and (6) and section 3) into force at the end of the period of twelve months beginning with the date on which it was passed, and extends it to Scotland only.

The act also repealed the Removings Act 1693 (1693 c. 40), an act of the old Parliament of Scotland, which had previously defined the dates of the term and quarter days.

The Term and Quarter Days:

- 28 February
- 28 May
- 28 August
- 28 November

== See also ==
- List of acts of the Parliament of the United Kingdom
- Scottish term days
