= Plough Sunday =

Traditional English celebration

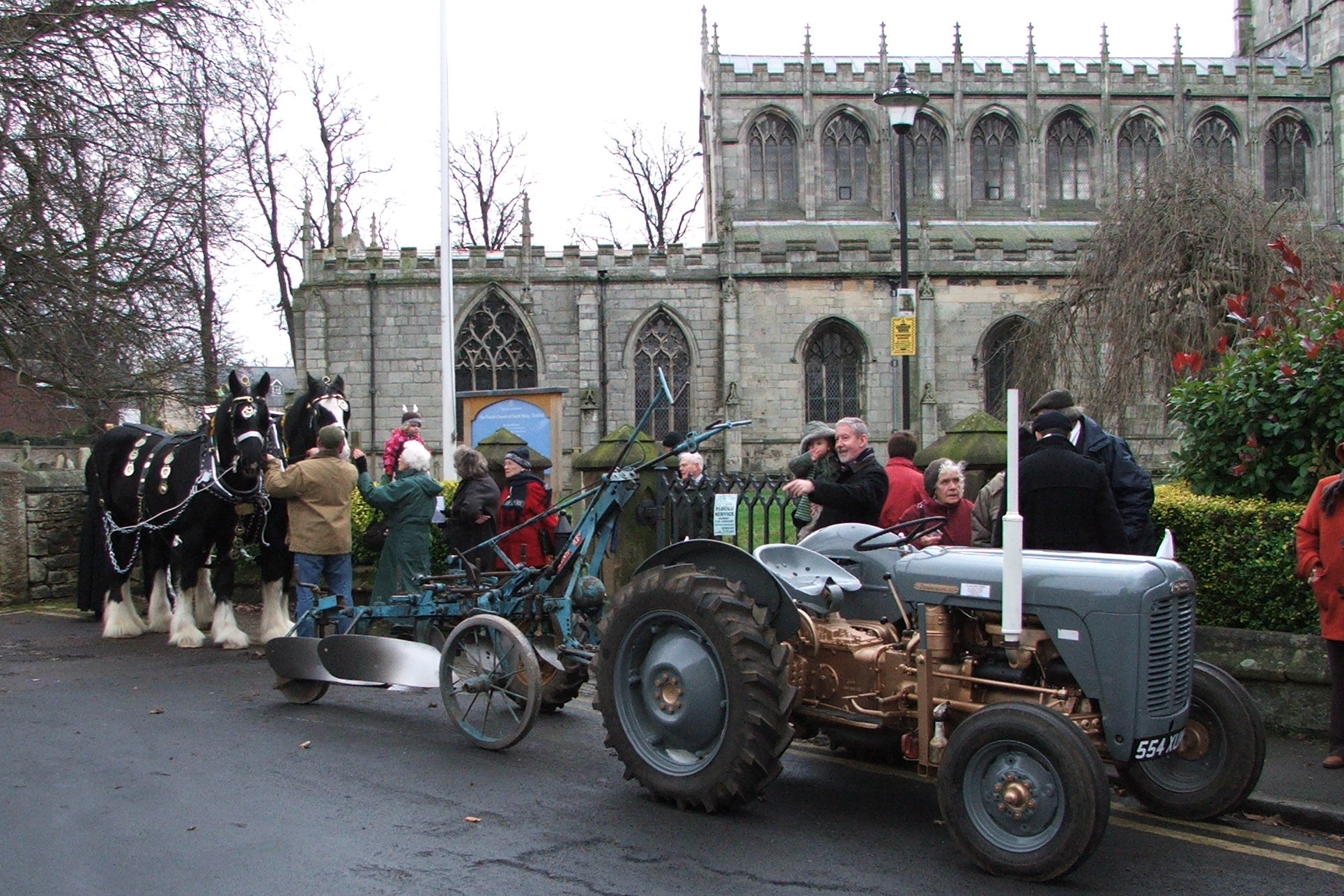
A Plough Sunday gathering outside a village church in Tickhill, South Yorkshire

Plough Sunday is an English celebration held on the day before Plough Monday, the traditional start of the agricultural year. There is little evidence that Plough Sunday was specifically celebrated historically, although in agricultural communities the church service would probably have referenced ploughing in recognition of the season. However, following the Second World War there was an attempt to revive what was thought to be an old Plough Sunday tradition.

Plough Sunday celebrations usually involve bringing a ploughshare into a church with prayers for the blessing of the land. It is traditionally held on the Sunday after Epiphany, the Sunday between 7 January and 13 January. Although the nature of farming has changed over the centuries, Plough Sunday is seen as a way of generally celebrating farming and the work of farmers. In the Church of England book of liturgy, Common Worship: Times and Seasons, there is a suggested prayer for the "Blessing of the Plough", for the "Blessing of Seed" and passages of Scripture related to the agricultural theme.

As well as a ploughshare, in rural areas, it is common for local farmers to attend the service with their tractors - both new and old. Sometimes, services may be accompanied by other traditions such as Morris dancing. Historically, villagers would walk through their village collecting alms, before gathering at the church for the Blessing of the Plough.

Particularly notable Plough Sunday services are held at Sherborne Abbey in Dorset, Hedenham Church in Norfolk, and the cathedrals in Exeter and Chichester.
