= Lammas =

Christian holiday marking the blessing of First Fruits

Lammas Loaf Mass Day
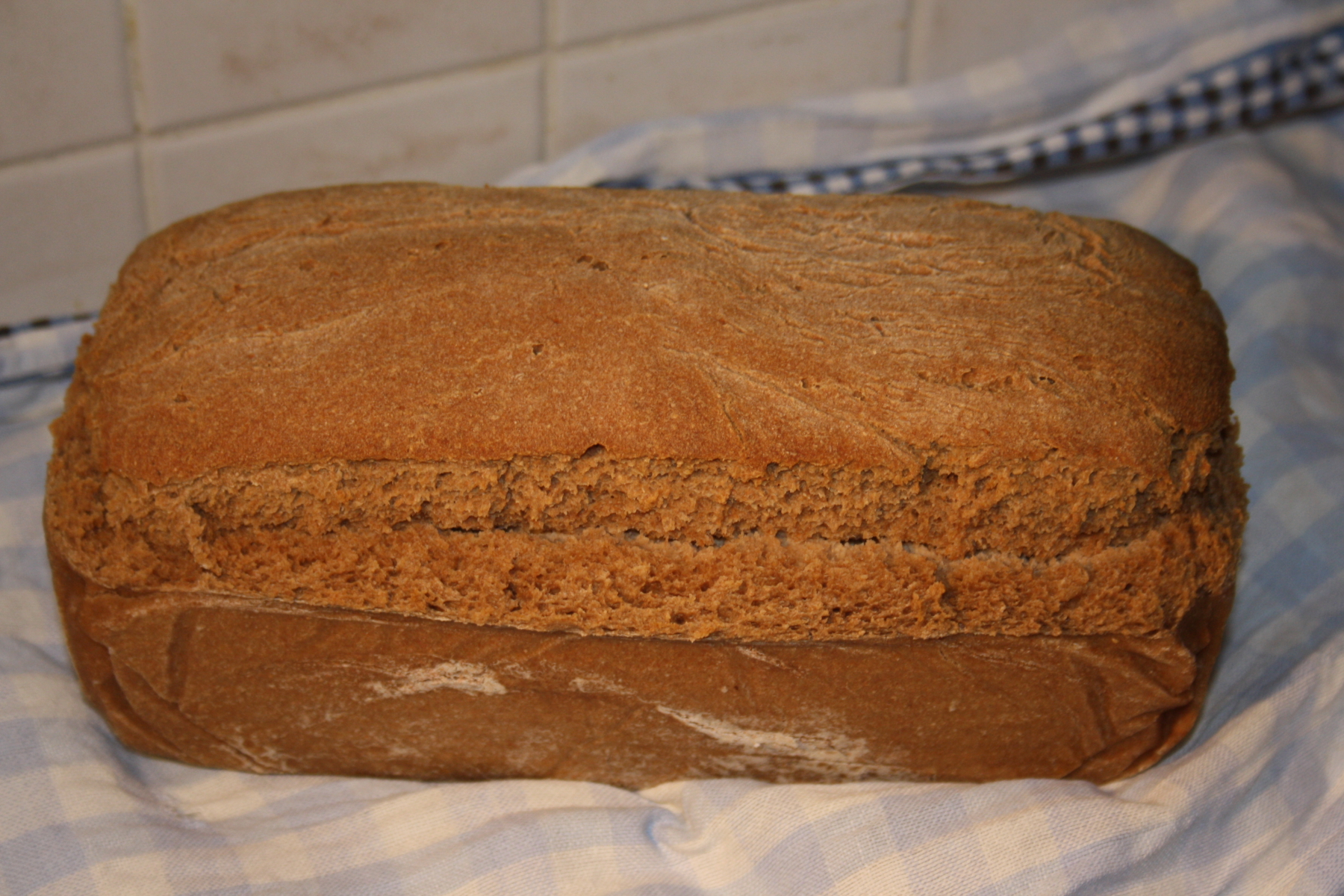
- A loaf of bread
- Observed by: Christians (Catholics, Lutherans, Anglicans) and some Pagans
- Type: Christian
- Celebrations: Mass, church processions, First Fruits
- Observances: Bringing a loaf of bread made from the new wheat crop to the church for a blessing, making loaves from the grain collected at harvest
- Date: 1 August
- Related to: Plough Sunday, Rogation days, Shavuot, Lughnasadh

Lammas (from Old English hlāfmæsse, "loaf-mass"), also known as Loaf Mass Day, is a Christian holiday celebrated in some English-speaking countries on 1 August. The name originates from the word "loaf" in reference to bread and "Mass" in reference to the Eucharist. It is a festival in the liturgical calendar to mark the blessing of the First Fruits of harvest, with a loaf of bread being brought to the church for this purpose. Lammastide falls at the halfway point between the summer solstice and the autumn equinox. Christians also have church processions to bakeries, where those working therein are blessed by Christian clergy.

While Lammas is traditionally a Christian holy day, some neopagans have adopted the name and date for one of their harvest festivals in their Wheel of the Year. It is also the same date as the Gaelic harvest festival Lughnasadh.

== Name ==
The name 'Lammas' comes from Old English hlafmæsse meaning "loaf mass".

Several antiquarians have suggested that the name 'Lammas' came from 'lamb mass'. John Brady supposed that tenants of the Cathedral of York, dedicated to St Peter in Chains, of which this is the feast, were required to bring a live lamb to the church.

Another name for the feast in the Middle Ages was the 'Gule of August'. It has been suggested, following the 18th-century Welsh clerical antiquary John Pettingall, that this is an anglicisation of Gŵyl Awst, Welsh for "feast of August".

== History ==
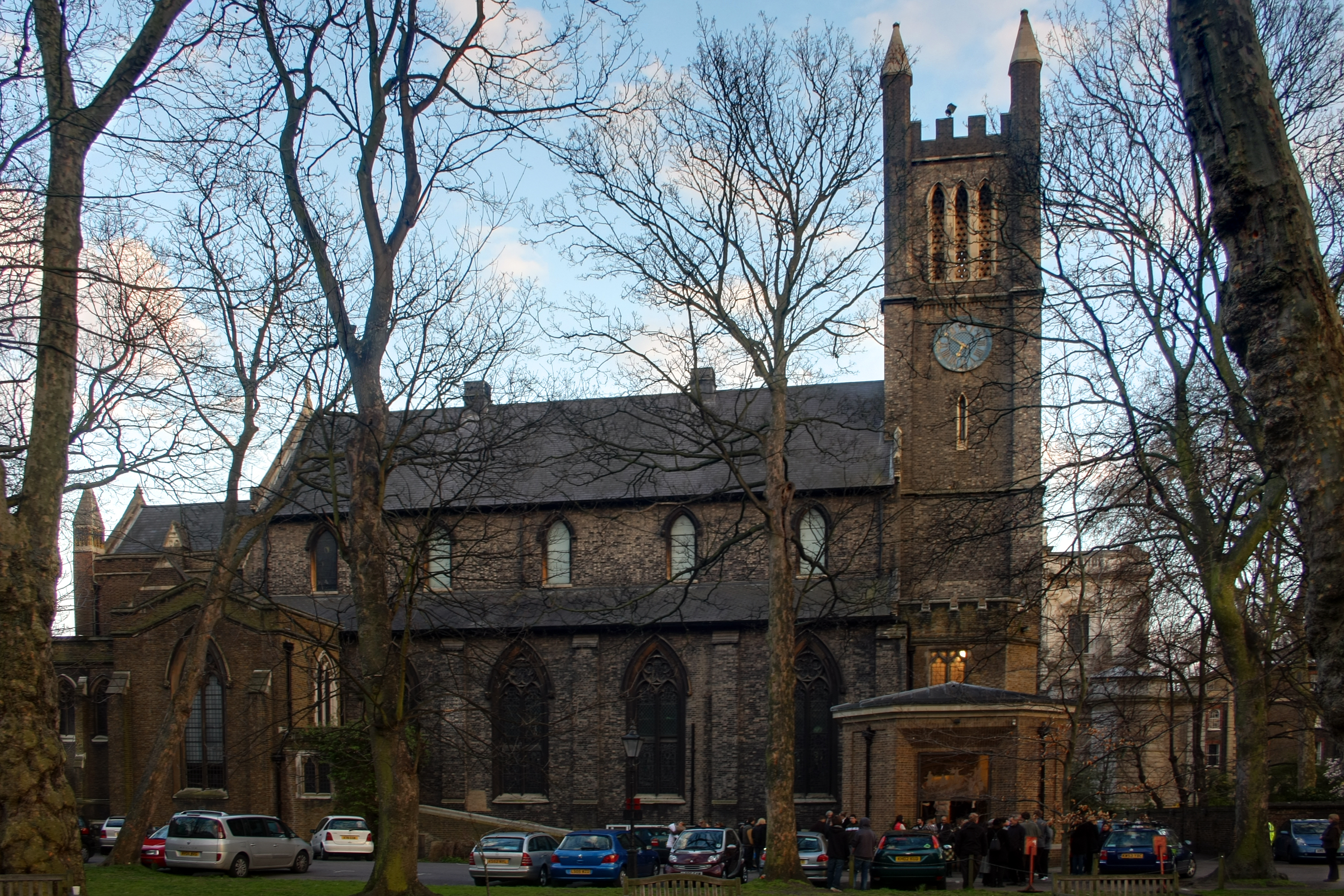
On Loaf Mass Day, bread is brought into the parish church to be blessed by a Christian cleric.

In Christianity, the offering of first fruits to God is described in the Old Testament, which depicts how, "when the harvest ripened, the priest went into the field and gathered a sheaf of first-ripened grain. Then he took that sheaf into the temple and waved it before the Lord." The Didache of the early Church enjoined firstfruits be given of "money, clothes, and all of your possessions" (13:7).

In Anglo-Saxon England Lammas was the name for the first day of August and was described in Old English literature as "the feast of first fruits", being mentioned often in the Anglo-Saxon Chronicle. It was probably the day when loaves baked from the first of the wheat harvest were blessed at church. The loaves might then have been used in protective rituals: a book of Anglo-Saxon charms directed that the Lammas loaf be broken into four parts, which were to be placed at the four corners of the barn, to protect the grain.

For many villeins, the wheat must have run low in the days before Lammas, and the new harvest began a season of plenty, of hard work and company in the fields, reaping in teams. In the medieval agricultural year, Lammas also marked the end of the hay harvest that had begun after Midsummer. At the end of hay-making a sheep would be loosed in the meadow among the mowers, for him to keep who could catch it.

Historian Ronald Hutton writes "the time that the first of the harvest could be gathered would have been a natural point for celebration in an agrarian society". He says it is likely "that a pre-Christian festival had existed among the Anglo-Saxons on that date". Folklorist Máire MacNeill linked Lammas with the Insular Celtic harvest festival Lughnasadh, held on the same date, and suggested the Anglo-Saxons adopted it from the Celtic Britons. She highlighted the apparent lack of a Continental Germanic festival on 1 August, and the apparent borrowing of the Welsh name Gŵyl Awst, 'Gule of August'. However, Hutton says that "MacNeill's thesis of a pan-Celtic seasonal ritual, like her reconstruction of pagan rites, is so far un-proven" and to prove it "would involve a detailed knowledge of the religious calendar of the Anglo-Saxons before they arrived in England, which is impossible".

Lammas Day was one of the traditional Scottish quarter days before 1886. Lammas also coincided with the feast of St Peter in Chains, commemorating Saint Peter's miraculous deliverance from prison, but in the liturgical reform of 1969 the feast of St Alphonsus Liguori was transferred to this day.

Ann Lewin explains the Christian feast of Lammas (Loaf Mass Day) and its importance in the liturgical year:

August begins with Lammas Day, Loaf Mass Day, the day in the Book of Common Prayer calendar when a loaf baked with flour from newly harvested corn would be brought into church and blessed. It's one of the oldest points of contact between the agricultural world and the Church. The others were Plough Sunday in early January, the Sunday after Epiphany and the day before work would begin again in the fields after Christmas festivities, when ploughs would be brought to church to be blessed; and Rogation days in May, the days before Ascension Day, when God's blessing would be sought on the growing crops.

Today, in the Church of England, the mother church of the Anglican Communion, during the celebration of Holy Communion, "The Lammas loaf, or part of it, may be used as the bread of the Eucharist, or the Lammas loaf and the eucharistic bread may be kept separate." Common Worship specifies:

The Lammas loaf should ideally be baked by members of the congregation, using local produce wherever possible. Other small loaves or buns, in the tradition of 'blessed bread,' may be distributed to the congregation. Part of the Lammas loaf may be used as the eucharistic bread on this occasion. Two patterns of readings are suggested, the first concerning the offering of the first-fruits and the second concerning the bread of life.

Christians also have church processions to bakeries, where those working therein are blessed by Christian clergy.

In Shakespeare's Romeo and Juliet (1.3.19) it is observed of Juliet, "Come Lammas Eve at night shall she [Juliet] be fourteen." Another well-known cultural reference is the opening of The Battle of Otterburn: "It fell about the Lammas tide when the muir-men win their hay."

== Other uses ==
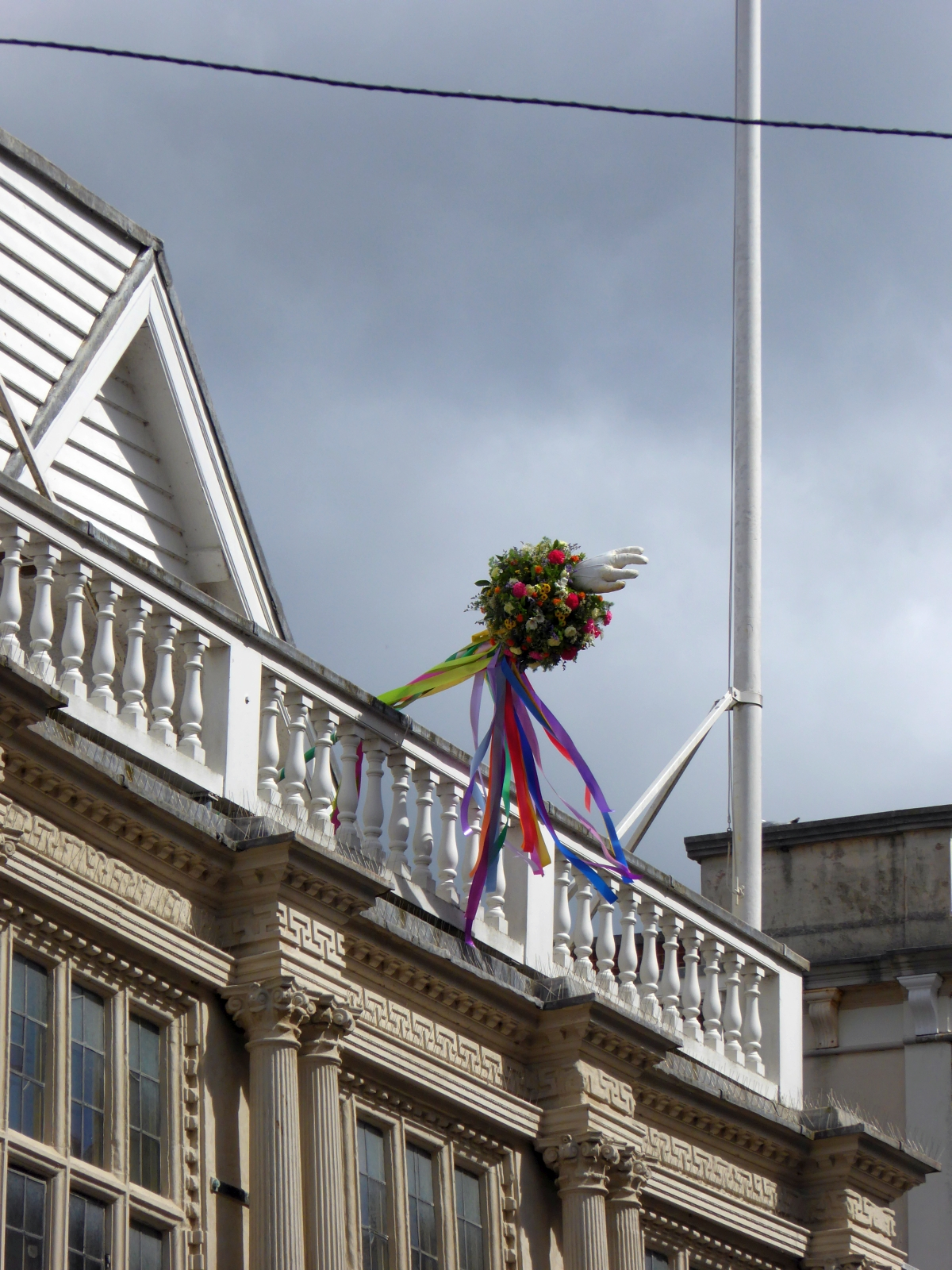
Exeter's Lammas Fair glove in 2015

=== Neopaganism ===
Some neopagans have adopted the name and date of Lammas, making it one of the harvest festivals in their Wheel of the Year. Other neopagans use the Gaelic name Lughnasa. It is the first of the three autumn festivals, the others being the autumn equinox and Samhain. In the Northern Hemisphere it takes place around 1 August, while in the Southern Hemisphere it is celebrated around 1 February.

=== Horticulture ===
Lammas leaves or Lammas growth refers to a second crop of leaves produced in high summer by some species of trees in temperate countries to replace those lost to insect damage. They often differ slightly in shape, texture and/or hairiness from the earlier leaves.

=== Lammas Fairs ===
Exeter in Devon is one of the few towns in England that still celebrates its Lammas Fair and has a processional custom which stretches back over 900 years, led by the Lord Mayor. During the fair a white glove on a pole decorated with garlands is raised above the Guildhall. The fair now takes place on the first Thursday in July. Other examples include Ould Lammas Fair and Inverkeithing Lammas Fair.St Andrews in Fife, Scotland continues to have an annual Lammas Fair which takes place along streets in the town.

=== Lammas Lands ===
"A class of commonable land, normally meadow, communally held and managed for part of the year, but thrown open to commonable animals when harvest was over. The normal day for throwing open these lands was Lammas Day (1 August) and they remained open until Lady Day (25 March)."

=== Lammas wheat ===
'Red Lammas' and 'White Lammas' are old strains of wheat, which have been used to breed more modern strains. There was also another strain, 'Yellow Lammas'.

=== Sustainability ===
A low-impact development project at Tir y Gafel, Glandwr, Pembrokeshire, Lammas Ecovillage, is a collective initiative for nine self-built homes. It was the first such project to obtain planning permission based on a predecessor of what is now the sixth national planning guidance for sustainable rural communities originally proposed by the One Planet Council.

=== In popular culture ===
- In the Inspector Morse episode "Day of the Devil", Lammas Day is presented as a Satanic (un)holy day, "the Devil's day".
- Lammas is a prominent plot point in the novel, Lammas Night (1983) by Katherine Kurtz.
- In William Shakespeare's Romeo and Juliet, the Nurse asks how long it is to Lammastide and Lady Capulet replies a fortnight and odd days and the Nurse says come Lammas' Eve at night Juliet shall be fourteen.

== See also ==
- Leyton Marshes
- Shavuot
