= Lammas growth =

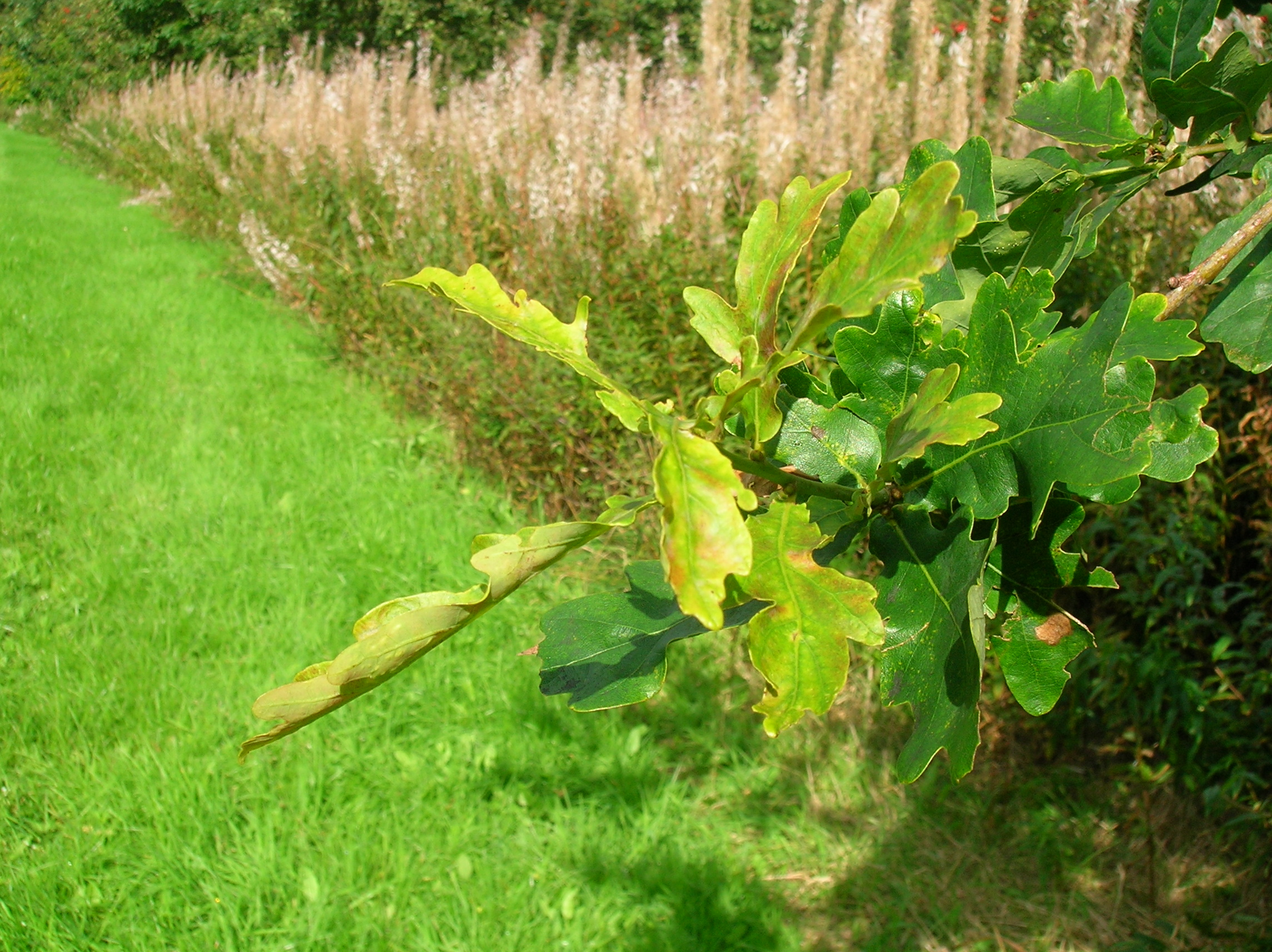
Lammas growth on a pedunculate oak.

Lammas growth, also called Lammas leaves, Lammas flush, second shoots, or summer shoots, is a season of renewed growth in some trees in temperate regions put on in July and August (if in the northern hemisphere, January and February if in the southern), that is around Lammas day, August 1.

It can occur in both hardwoods and softwoods. Examples of common trees which exhibit regrowth are oak, ash, beech, sycamore, yew, scots pine, sitka spruce, poplar and hawthorn. This secondary growth may be an evolutionary strategy to compensate for leaf damage caused by insects during the spring. It is not present in birch or willow.

Lammas growth declines with the age of the tree, being most vigorous and noticeable in young trees. It differs in nature from spring growth which is fixed when leaves and shoots are laid down in the bud the previous year. The lammas flush involves newly made leaves. One or more of the buds set in the spring on the ends of terminal and lateral stems will break, and begin to grow, producing a new shoot.
