= St. Martin's Day =

Feast day of Saint Martin of Tours

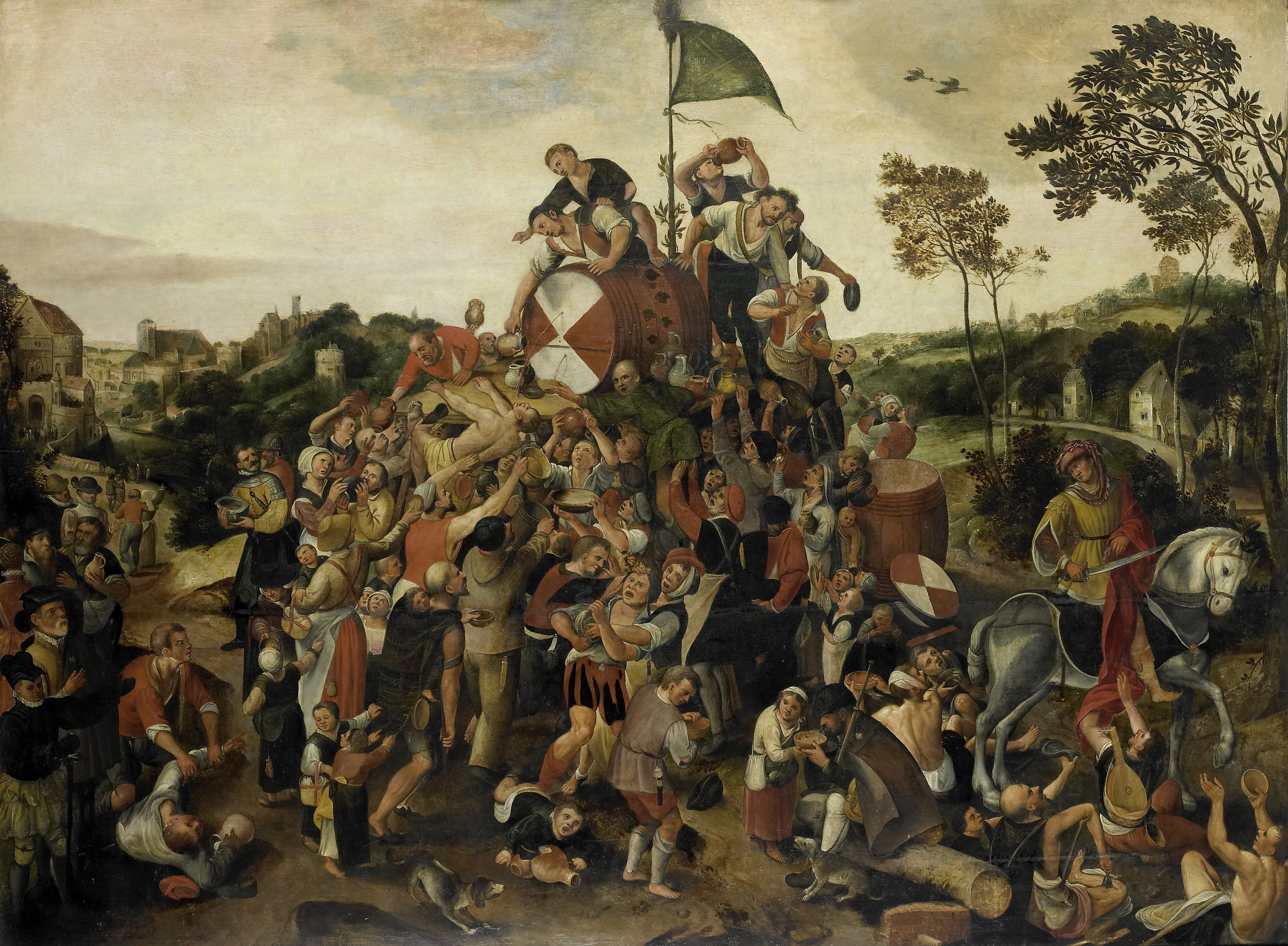
St Martin's Day Kermis by Peeter Baltens (16th century), shows peasants celebrating by drinking the first wine of the season, and a horseman representing the saint

Saint Martin's Day or Martinmas (obsolete: Martlemas), and historically called Old Halloween (Note: or Old Allhalloween) or Old All Hallows Eve, (Note: or Old Allhallowmas Eve) is the feast day of Saint Martin of Tours and is celebrated in the liturgical year on 11 November. In the Middle Ages and early modern period, it was an important festival in many parts of Europe, particularly Germanic-speaking regions. In these regions, it marked the end of the harvest season and beginning of winter and the "winter revelling season". Traditions include feasting on 'Martinmas goose' or 'Martinmas beef', drinking the first wine of the season, and mumming. In some German and Dutch-speaking towns, there are processions of children with lanterns (Laternelaufen), sometimes led by a horseman representing St Martin. The saint was also said to bestow gifts on children. In the Rhineland, it is also marked by lighting bonfires.

== Origins ==
Martin of Tours (died 397 AD) was a Roman soldier who was baptized as an adult and became a bishop in Gaul. He is best known for the legend whereby he cut his cloak in half with his sword to give half to a beggar who was dressed in only rags in the depth of winter. That night Martin had a vision of Jesus Christ wearing the half-cloak.

In his study Medieval English Martinmesse: The Archaeology of a Forgotten Festival, Martin Walsh suggests that 'Martinmas' had roots in a pre-Christian festival marking the end of the harvest season and beginning of winter. In the ancient Roman world, 10 November was reckoned as the beginning of winter.

== Customs ==
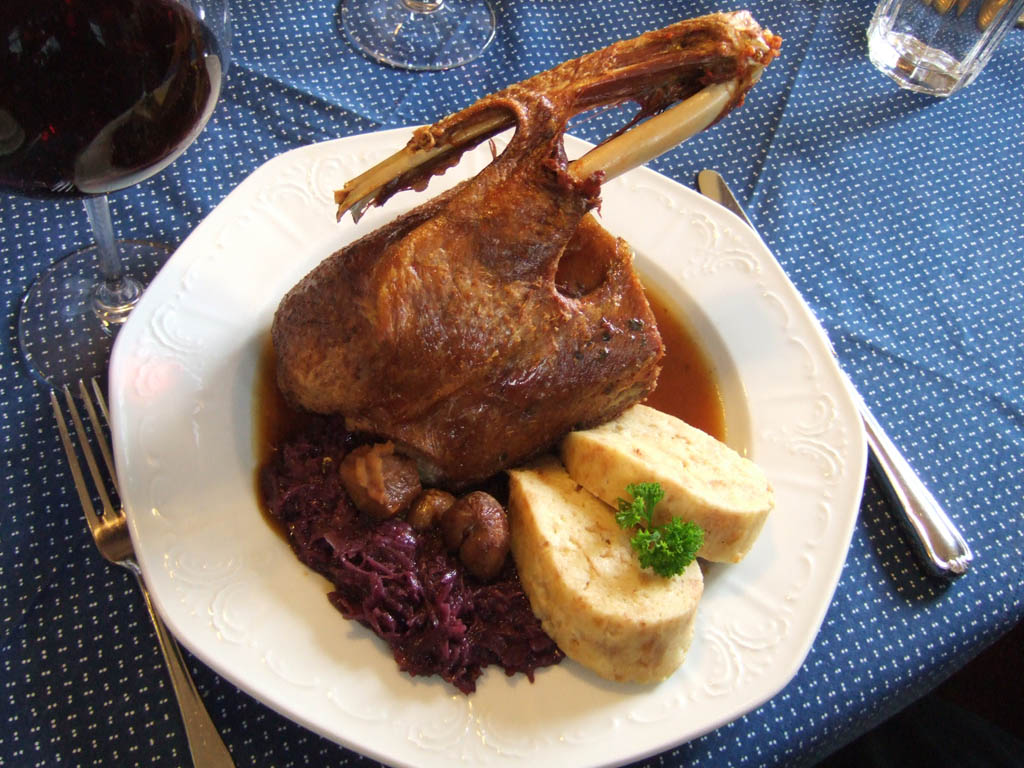
A tradition on St Martin's Eve or Day is to share a goose for dinner.

Traditionally, in many parts of Europe, St Martin's Day marked the end of the harvest and the beginning of winter. The feast coincides with the end of the Octave of Allhallowtide.

=== Feasting and drinking ===
Martinmas was traditionally when livestock were slaughtered for winter provision. It may originally have been a time of animal sacrifice, as the Old English name for November was Blōtmōnaþ ('sacrifice month').

Goose is eaten at Martinmas in most places. There is a legend that St Martin, when trying to avoid being ordained bishop, hid in a pen of geese whose cackling gave him away. Once a key medieval autumn feast, a custom of eating goose on the day spread to Sweden from France. It was primarily observed by the craftsmen and noblemen of the towns. In the peasant community, not everyone could afford this, so many ate duck or hen instead.

In winegrowing regions of Europe, the first wine was ready around the time of Martinmas. Although there was no mention of a link between St Martin and winegrowing by Gregory of Tours or other early hagiographers, St Martin is widely credited in France with helping to spread winemaking throughout the region of Tours (Touraine) and facilitating vine-planting. The old Greek tale that Aristaeus discovered the advantage of pruning vines after watching a goat, has been appropriated to St Martin. He is credited with introducing the Chenin blanc grape, from which most of the white wine of western Touraine and Anjou is made.

=== Bonfires and lanterns ===
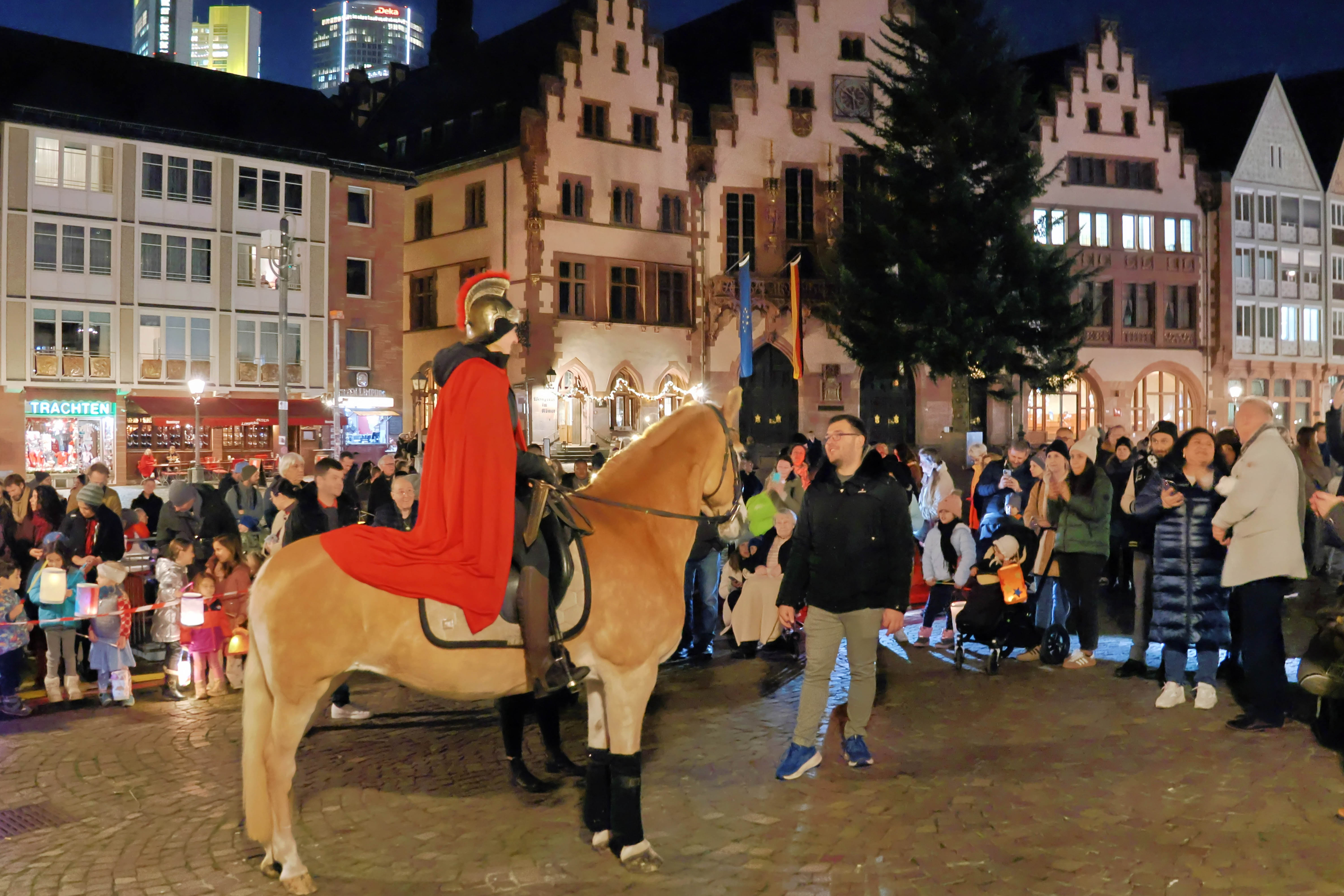
St. Martin's procession in Frankfurt

Bonfires are lit on St Martin's Eve in the Rhineland region of Germany. In the 15th century, these bonfires were so numerous that the festival was nicknamed Funkentag ('spark day'). In the 19th century it was recorded that young people danced around the fire and leapt through the flames, and that the ashes were strewn on the fields to make them fertile.

In some German and Dutch-speaking towns, there are nighttime processions of children carrying paper lanterns or turnip lanterns and singing songs of St Martin. These processions are known in German as Laternelaufen.

=== Gift-bringers ===
In parts of Flanders and the Rhineland, processions are led by a man on horseback representing St Martin, who may give out apples, nuts, cakes or other sweets for children. Historically, in Ypres, children hung up stockings filled with hay on Martinmas Eve, and awoke the next morning to find gifts in them. These were said to have been left by St Martin as thanks for the fodder provided for his horse.

In the Swabia and Ansbach regions of Germany, a character called Pelzmärten ('pelt Martin' or 'skin Martin') appeared at Martinmas until the 19th century. With a black face and wearing a cow bell, he ran about frightening children, and he dealt out blows as well as nuts and apples.

=== Eve of St Martin's Lent ===
In the 6th century, church councils began requiring fasting on all days, except Saturdays and Sundays, from the day after Saint Martin's Day to Epiphany (elsewhere, the Feast of the Three Wise Men for the stopping of the star over Bethlehem) on January 6 (a total of 56 days). An addition to and an equivalent to the 40 days fasting of Lent, given its weekend breaks, this was called Quadragesima Sancti Martini (Saint Martin's Lent, or literally 'the fortieth of'). This fasting is rarely observed now. This period was later shortened to begin on the Sunday before December and became the current Advent within a few centuries.

In the Archdiocese of Milan, Italy, according to Ancient Ambrosian Liturgical usage, the feast of St Martin is followed by the First Sunday in Advent (the 6 week period is still used in this large Diocese and the Churches outside it, such as in Ticino (Switzerland) that do still use the Ambrosian Rite.

== Celebrations by culture ==
=== Germanic ===
==== Austrian ====
In Austria, St Martin's Day is celebrated similar to Germany. The nights before and on the night of 11 November, children walk in processions carrying lanterns, which they made in school, and sing Martin songs. Martiniloben is celebrated as a collective festival. It marks the end of the wine-growers’ year. Events include art exhibitions, wine tastings, and live music. Martinigansl (roasted goose) is the traditional dish of the season.

As Saint Martin of Tours is patron saint of Burgenland, a federal state in Austria, November 11th is a holiday by state law in Burgenland.

==== Dutch and Flemish ====
Celebrating children in the Zaanstreek (1961)

Sint-Maarten is an old harvest festival that is celebrated in many European countries and precedes the fasting period of Advent. In the Netherlands, on the evening of 11 November, children went door to door with lanterns made of hollowed-out sugar beet. This has been replaced by paper lanterns, usually crafted by themselves. They sing songs such as "Sinte(re) Sinte(re) Maarten", to receive sweets or fruit in return. In the past, poor people would visit farms on 11 November to get food for the winter. In the 1600s, the city of Amsterdam held boat races on the IJ, where 400 to 500 light craft, both rowing boats and sailboats, took part with a vast crowd on the banks. St Martin is the patron saint of the cities of Utrecht and Groningen.

In Flanders, the Dutch-speaking part of Belgium, St Martin's Eve is celebrated on the evening of 10 November, mainly in West Flanders and around Ypres. Children go through the streets with paper lanterns and candles, and sing songs about St Martin. Sometimes, a man dressed as St Martin rides on a horse in front of the procession. In Wervik, children go from door to door, singing traditional "Séngmarténg" songs, sporting a hollow beetroot with a carved face and a candle inside called "Bolle Séngmarténg"; they gather at an evening bonfire.

==== English and Scottish ====
In Scotland, Martinmas became one of the legal ‘term and quarter days’ when rent had to be paid and farm leases were commonly terminated. Although 11 November, traditional Martinmas, was the quarter day for centuries, in the 20th century by statute the Martinmas term day changed to 28 November and this is now in the Term and Quarter Days (Scotland) Act 1990. The legal quarter days are different in England. Martinmas was widely celebrated on 11 November in medieval and early modern England. In his study Medieval English Martinmesse: The Archaeology of a Forgotten Festival, Martin Walsh describes Martinmas as a festival marking the end of the harvest season and beginning of winter. He suggests it had pre-Christian roots. Martinmas ushered in the "winter revelling season" and involved feasting on the meat of livestock that had been slaughtered for winter provision (especially 'Martlemas beef'), drinking, storytelling, and mumming. It was a time for saying farewell to travelling ploughmen, who shared in the feast along with the harvest-workers.

According to Walsh, Martinmas eventually died out in England as a result of the English Reformation, the emergence of Guy Fawkes Night (5 November), as well as changes in farming and the Industrial Revolution. According to folklore, if the weather is warm on St Martin's Day, then a harsh winter will follow. Today, 11 November is Remembrance Day.

==== German ====
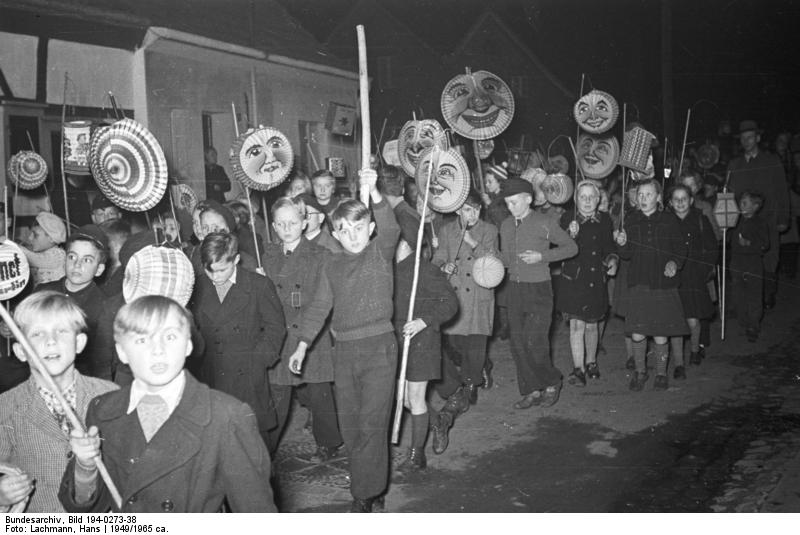
St. Martin's procession with children carrying paper lanterns in West Germany in 1949

Martin's procession and Martin's bonfire, Konz, Germany, Rhineland-Palatinate 2016

A widespread custom in Germany is to light bonfires, called Martinsfeuer, on St. Martin's Eve. In recent years, the processions that accompany those fires have been spread over almost a fortnight before Martinmas (Martinstag). At one time, the Rhine River valley would be lined with fires on the eve of Martinmas. In the Rhineland, St. Martin's Day is traditionally celebrated with a feast of goose.

The nights before and on the eve itself, children walk in processions called Laternelaufen, carrying lanterns, which they made in school, and sing St. Martin's songs. Usually, the walk starts at a church and goes to a public square. A man on horseback representing St. Martin accompanies the children. When they reach the square, Martin's bonfire is lit and Martin's pretzels are distributed.

In the Rhineland, the children also go from house to house with their lanterns, sing songs and get candy in return. The origin of the procession of lanterns is unclear. To some, it is a substitute for the Martinmas bonfire, which is still lit in a few cities and villages throughout Europe. It formerly symbolized the light that holiness brings to the darkness, just as St Martin brought hope to the poor through his good deeds. Even though the bonfire tradition is gradually being lost, the procession of lanterns is still practiced.

A Martinsgans ('St Martin's goose') is typically served on St. Martin's Eve following the procession of lanterns. Martinsgans is usually served in restaurants, roasted, with red cabbage and dumplings.

The traditional sweet of Martinmas in the Rhineland is Martinshörnchen, a pastry shaped in the form of a croissant, which recalls both the hooves of St. Martin's horse and, by being the half of a pretzel, the parting of his mantle. In some areas, these pastries are instead shaped like men (Stutenkerl or Weckmänner).

St Martin's Day is also celebrated in German Lorraine and Alsace, which border the Rhineland and are now part of France. Children receive gifts and sweets. In Alsace, in particular the Haut-Rhin mountainous region, families with young children make lanterns out of painted paper that they carry in a colourful procession up the mountain at night. Some schools organize these events, in particular schools of the Rudolf Steiner (Waldorf education) pedagogy.

==== German American ====
In the United States, St. Martin's Day celebrations are uncommon, but are typically held by German American communities. Many German restaurants feature a traditional menu with goose and Glühwein (a mulled red wine). Saint Paul, Minnesota celebrates with a traditional lantern procession around Rice Park. The evening includes German treats and traditions that highlight the season of giving. In Dayton, Ohio the Dayton Liederkranz-Turner organization hosts a St Martin's Family Celebration on the weekend before with an evening lantern parade to the singing of St Martin's carols, followed by a bonfire.

==== Danish ====
St Martin's Day (Mortens Dag), November 11, and St Martin's Eve (Mortensaften), November 10, was an early autumn feast in Denmark. Eating St Martin's goose (mortensgås) St Martin's Eve was a well-known custom in Denmark. The oldest known Danish source is from 1616. Today, the goose is often replaced by duck.

==== Swedish ====
St Martin's Day or St Martin's Eve (Mårtensafton) was an important medieval autumn feast in Sweden. In early November, geese are ready for slaughter, and on St Martin's Eve it is tradition to have a roast goose dinner. The custom is particularly popular in Scania in southern Sweden, where goose farming has long been practised, but it has gradually spread northwards. A proper goose dinner also includes svartsoppa (a heavily spiced soup made from geese blood) and apple charlotte.

=== Slavic ===
==== Croatian ====
In Croatia, St. Martin's Day (Martinje, Martinovanje) marks the day when the must traditionally turns to wine. The must is usually considered impure and sinful, until it is baptised and turned into wine. The baptism is performed by someone who dresses up as a bishop and blesses the wine; this is usually done by the host. Another person is chosen as the godfather of the wine.

==== Czech ====
A Czech proverb connected with the Feast of St. Martin – Martin přijíždí na bílém koni (transl. 'Martin is coming on a white horse') – signifies that the first half of November in the Czech Republic is the time when it often starts to snow. St. Martin's Day is the traditional feast day in the run-up to Advent. Restaurants often serve roast goose as well as young wine from the recent harvest known as Svatomartinské víno, which is similar to Beaujolais nouveau as the first wine of the season. Wine shops and restaurants around Prague pour the first of the St. Martin's wines at 11:11 a.m. Many restaurants offer special menus for the day, featuring the traditional roast goose. Many people bake special St. Martin rolls in a shape of a horseshoe filled with nuts or poppy seeds (Svatomartinské rohlíčky). Children walk in processions carrying lanterns.

==== Polish ====
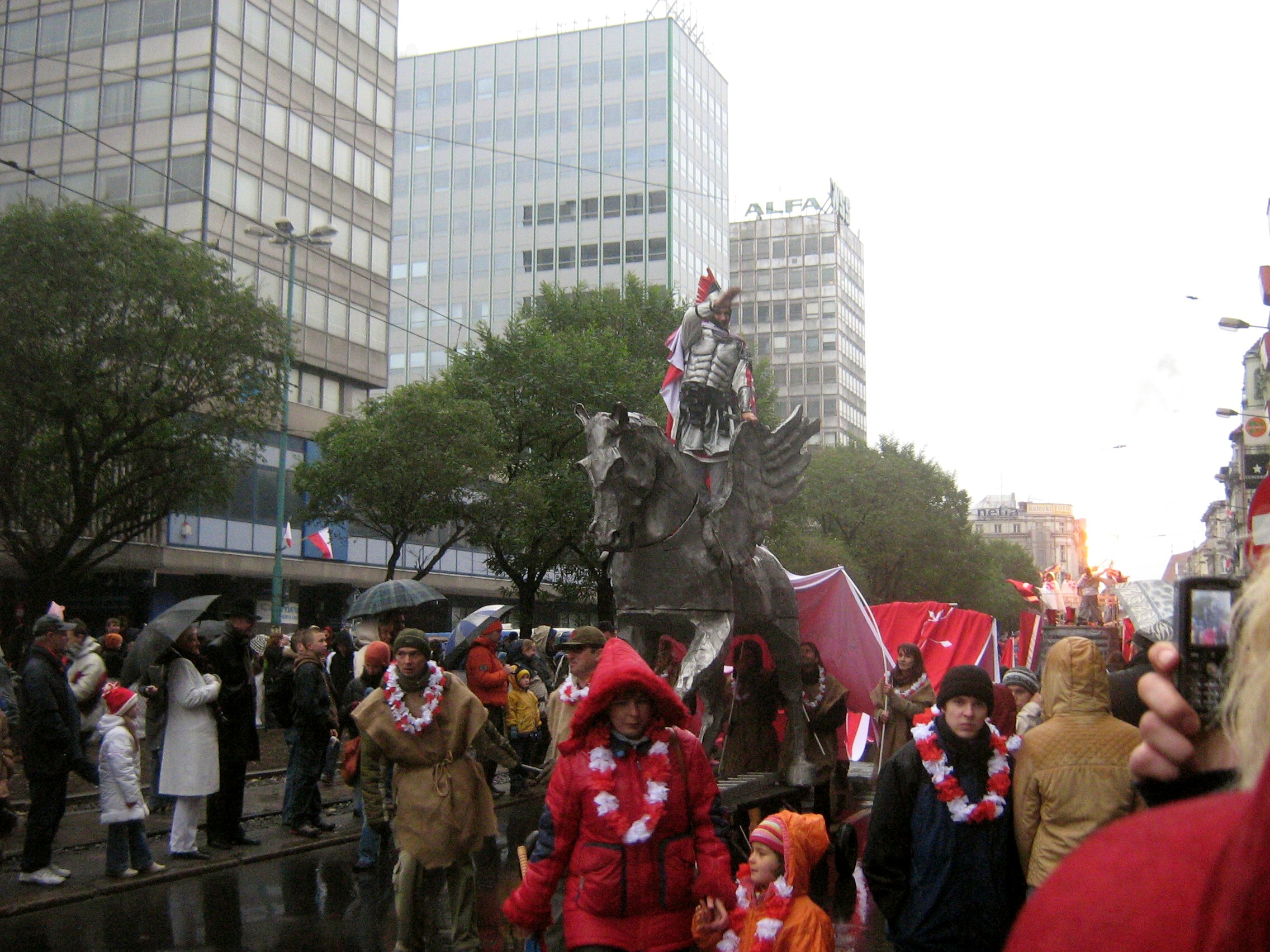
Procession of Saint Martin in Poznań, 2006

In Poland, 11 November is National Independence Day. St. Martin's Day (Dzień Świętego Marcina) is celebrated mainly in the city of Poznań where its citizens buy and eat considerable amounts of croissants filled with almond paste with white poppy seeds, the St. Martin's Croissants (rogal świętomarciński). Legend has it that this centuries-old tradition commemorates a Poznań baker's dream which had the saint entering the city on a white horse that lost its golden horseshoe. The next morning, the baker whipped up horseshoe-shaped croissants filled with almonds, white poppy seeds and nuts, and gave them to the poor. In recent years, competition amongst local patisseries has become fierce. The product is registered under the European Union Protected Designation of Origin and only a limited number of bakers hold an official certificate. Poznanians celebrate the festival with concerts, parades and a fireworks show on Saint Martin's Street. Goose meat dishes are also eaten during the holiday.

==== Slovene ====
The biggest event in Slovenia is the St. Martin's Day celebration in Maribor which marks the symbolic winding up of all the wine growers' endeavours. There is the ceremonial "christening" of the new wine, and the arrival of the Wine Queen. The square Trg Leona Štuklja is filled with musicians and stalls offering autumn produce and delicacies.

=== Celtic ===
==== Irish ====
In some parts of Ireland, on the eve of St. Martin's Day (Lá Fhéile Mártain in Irish), it was tradition to sacrifice a cockerel by bleeding it. The blood was collected and sprinkled on the four corners of the house. Also in Ireland, no wheel of any kind was to turn on St Martin's Day, because Martin was said by some people to have been thrown into a mill stream and killed by the wheel and so it was not right to turn any kind of wheel on that day. A local legend in County Wexford says that putting to sea is to be avoided as St. Martin rides a white horse across Wexford Bay bringing death by drowning to any who see him.

==== Welsh ====
In Welsh mythology the day is associated with the Cŵn Annwn, the spectral hounds who escort souls to the otherworld (Annwn). St Martin's Day was one of the few nights the hounds would engage in a Wild Hunt, stalking the land for criminals and villains. The supernatural character of the day in Welsh culture is evident in the number of omens associated with it. Marie Trevelyan recorded that if the hooting of an owl was heard on St Martin's Day it was seen as a bad omen for that district. If a meteor was seen, then there would be trouble for the whole nation.

=== Latvian ===
Mārtiņi (Martin's) is traditionally celebrated by Latvians on 10 November, marking the end of the preparations for winter, such as salting meat and fish, storing the harvest and making preserves. It is a day when the lines between the spirit world and the world of the living begin to blur. Mārtiņi also marks the beginning of masquerading and sledding, among other winter activities.

=== Maltese ===
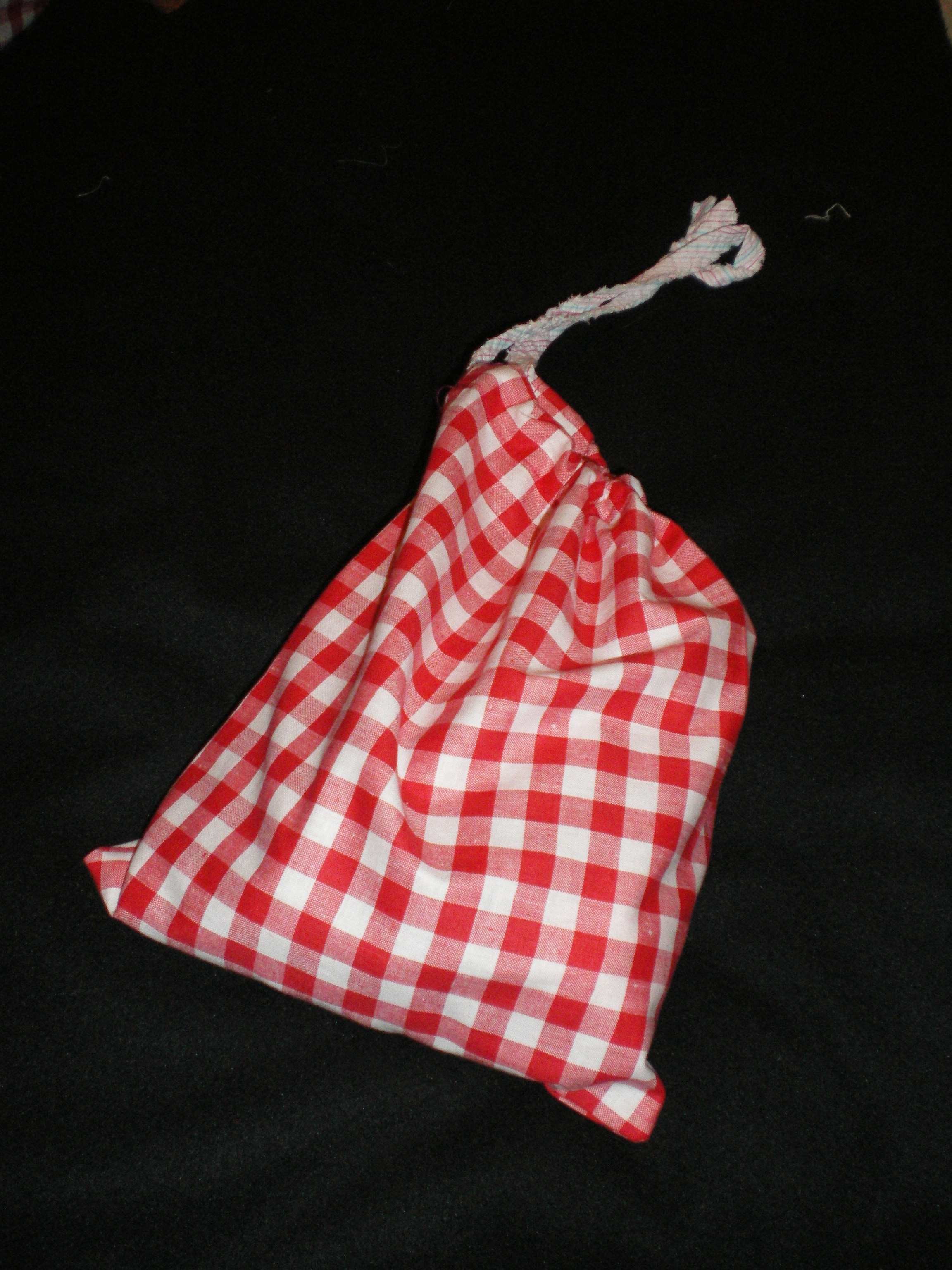
A Maltese Borża ta' San Martin

St. Martin's Day (Maltese: Jum San Martin) is celebrated in Malta on the Sunday nearest to 11 November. Children are given a bag full of fruits and sweets associated with the feast, known by the Maltese as Il-Borża ta' San Martin, "St. Martin's bag". This bag may include walnuts, hazelnuts, almonds, chestnuts, dried or processed figs, seasonal fruit (like oranges, tangerines, apples and pomegranates) and "Saint Martin's bread roll" (Ħobża ta' San Martin). In old days, nuts were used by the children in their games.

There is a traditional rhyme associated with this custom:

Ġewż, Lewż, Qastan, Tin
Kemm inħobbu lil San Martin.

Translation:

(Walnuts, almonds, chestnuts, figs
I love Saint Martin so much.)

A feast is celebrated in the village of Baħrija on the outskirts of Rabat, including a procession led by the statue of Saint Martin. There is also a fair, and a show for local animals. Cooking chestnuts on the open fire was one of the main attractions. San Anton School, a private school on the island, organises a walk to and from a cave especially associated with Martin in remembrance of the day.

The Maltese phrase Is-Sajf ta' San Martin ('St Martin's Summer') refers to the usual good weather period experienced there around the feast of Saint Martin.

=== Portuguese and Galician ===
This period is also quite popular because of the usual good weather period that occurs in Portugal in this time of year, called Verão de São Martinho ('St Martin's Summer'). It is frequently tied to the legend since Portuguese versions of St Martin's legend usually replace the snowstorm with rain (because snow is not frequent in most parts of Portugal, while rain is common at that time of the year) and have Jesus bringing the end of it, thus making the "summer" a gift from God.

St Martin's Day (Dia de São Martinho) is commonly associated with the celebration of the maturation of the year's wine, being traditionally the first day when the new wine can be tasted. It is celebrated, traditionally around a bonfire, eating the magusto, chestnuts roasted under the embers of the bonfire (sometimes dry figs and walnuts), and drinking a local light alcoholic beverage called água-pé (literally 'foot water', made by adding water to the pomace left after the juice is pressed out of the grapes for wine – traditionally by stomping on them in vats with bare feet, and letting it ferment for several days), or the stronger jeropiga (a sweet liquor obtained in a very similar fashion, with aguardente added to the water). Água-pé, though no longer available for sale in supermarkets and similar outlets (it is officially banned for sale in Portugal), is still generally available in small local shops from domestic production.

Leite de Vasconcelos regarded the magusto as the vestige of an ancient sacrifice to honor the dead and stated that it was tradition in Barqueiros to prepare, at midnight, a table with chestnuts for the deceased family members to eat. A typical Portuguese saying related to Saint Martin's Day:

É dia de São Martinho;
comem-se castanhas, prova-se o vinho.

Translation:

It is St. Martin's Day,
we'll eat chestnuts, we'll taste the wine.

St Martin's Day is widely celebrated in Galicia. It is the traditional day for slaughtering fattened pigs for the winter. This tradition has given way to the popular saying "A cada cerdo le llega su San Martín from Galician A cada porquiño chégalle o seu San Martiño ('Every pig gets its St Martin'). The phrase is used to indicate that wrongdoers eventually get their comeuppance. In Moaña the San Martiño Festival starts early in the morning on 9 November and extends over four days.

=== Sicilian ===
In Sicily, November is the winemaking season. On the day Sicilians eat anise, hard biscuits dipped into Moscato, Malvasia or Passito. l'Estate di San Martino ('Saint Martin's Summer') is the traditional reference to a period of unseasonably warm weather in early to mid November, possibly shared with the Normans (who founded the Kingdom of Sicily) as common in at least late English folklore. The day is celebrated in a special way in a village near Messina and at a monastery dedicated to Saint Martin overlooking Palermo beyond Monreale. Other places in Sicily mark the day by eating fava beans.

== In art ==
Pieter Bruegel the Elder's physically largest painting is The Wine of Saint Martin's Day, which depicts the saint giving charity.

There is a closely similar painting by Peeter Baltens, which can be seen here.

Simone Martini (14th century) represented Saint Martin's life in several frescoes in a chapel of the Basilica of Saint Francis of Assisi in Assisi.

== See also ==
- St. Catherine's Day
