= March =

Third month in the Julian and Gregorian calendars

<<	March					>>
Su	Mo	Tu	We	Th	Fr	Sa
1	2	3	4	5	6	7
8	9	10	11	12	13	14
15	16	17	18	19	20	21
22	23	24	25	26	27	28
29	30	31
2026

March is the third month of the year in both the Julian and Gregorian calendars. Its length is 31 days. In the Northern Hemisphere, the meteorological beginning of spring occurs on the first day of March. The March equinox on the 20 or 21 marks the astronomical beginning of spring in the Northern Hemisphere and the beginning of autumn in the Southern Hemisphere, where September is the seasonal equivalent of the Northern Hemisphere's March.

== History ==
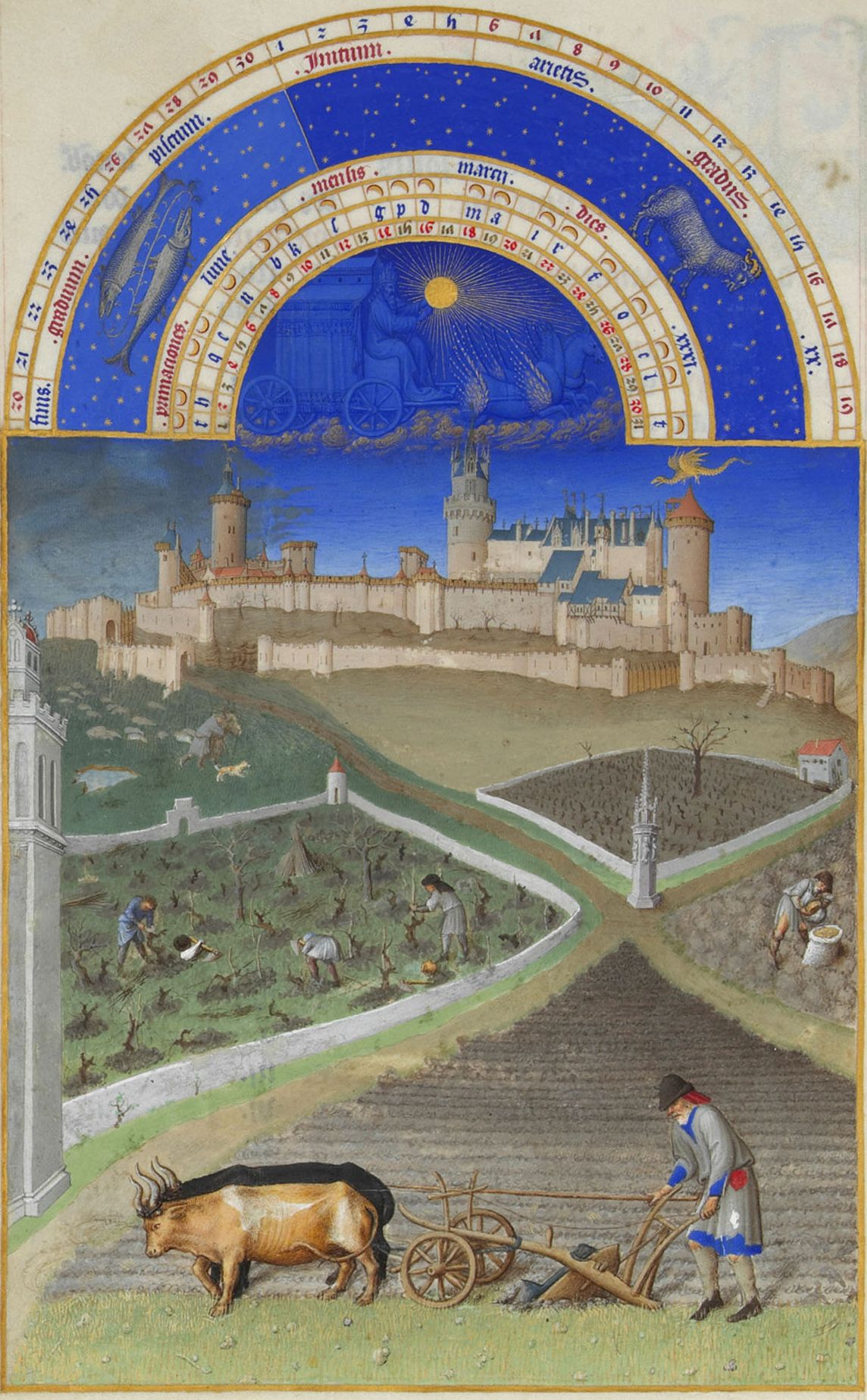
March, from the Très Riches Heures du Duc de Berry, a book of prayers to be said at canonical hours

In recent decades, the number of warm temperature records in March has outpaced cold temperature records over a growing portion of Earth's surface.

Chart shows changes in global average temperature annually in March of each year

The name of March comes from Martius, the first month of the earliest Roman calendar. It was named after Mars, the Roman god of war, and an ancestor of the Roman people through his sons Romulus and Remus. His month Martius was the beginning of the season for warfare, and the festivals held in his honor during the month were mirrored by others in October, when the season for these activities came to a close. Martius remained the first month of the Roman calendar year perhaps as late as 153 BC, and several religious observances in the first half of the month were originally new year's celebrations. Even in late antiquity, Roman mosaics picturing the months sometimes still placed March first.

March 1 began the numbered year in Russia until the end of the 15th century. Great Britain and its colonies continued to use March 25 until 1752, when they finally adopted the Gregorian calendar (the fiscal year in the UK continues to begin on 6 April, initially identical to 25 March in the former Julian calendar). Many other cultures, for example in Iran, or Ethiopia, still celebrate the beginning of the New Year in March.

March is the first month of spring in the Northern Hemisphere (North America, Europe, Asia and part of Africa) and the first month of fall or autumn in the Southern Hemisphere (South America, part of Africa, and Oceania).

Ancient Roman observances celebrated in March include Agonium Martiale, celebrated on March 1, March 14, and March 17, Matronalia, celebrated on March 1, Junonalia, celebrated on March 7, Equirria, celebrated on March 14, Mamuralia, celebrated on either March 14 or March 15, Hilaria on March 15 and then through March 22–28, Argei, celebrated on March 16–17, Liberalia and Bacchanalia, celebrated March 17, Quinquatria, celebrated March 19–23, and Tubilustrium, celebrated March 23. These dates do not correspond to the modern Gregorian calendar.

== Other names ==
In Finnish, the month is called maaliskuu, which is believed to originate from maallinen kuu. The latter means earthy month and may refer to the first appearance of "earth" from under the winter's snow. In Ukrainian, the month is called березень/berezenʹ, meaning birch tree, and březen in Czech. Historical names for March include the Saxon Lentmonat, named after the March equinox and gradual lengthening of days, and the eventual namesake of Lent. Saxons also called March Rhed-monat or Hreth-monath (deriving from their goddess Rhedam/Hreth), and Angles called it Hyld-monath, which became the English Lide. In Croatia, the month is called Ožujak. In Slovene, the traditional name is sušec, meaning the month when the earth becomes dry enough so that it is possible to cultivate it. The name was first written in 1466 in the Škofja Loka manuscript. Other names were used too, for example brezen and breznik, "the month of birches". The Turkish word Mart is given after the name of Mars the god. In Thai, the month is called มีนาคม, pronounced as minakhm, it means "arrival of fish".

== Symbols ==
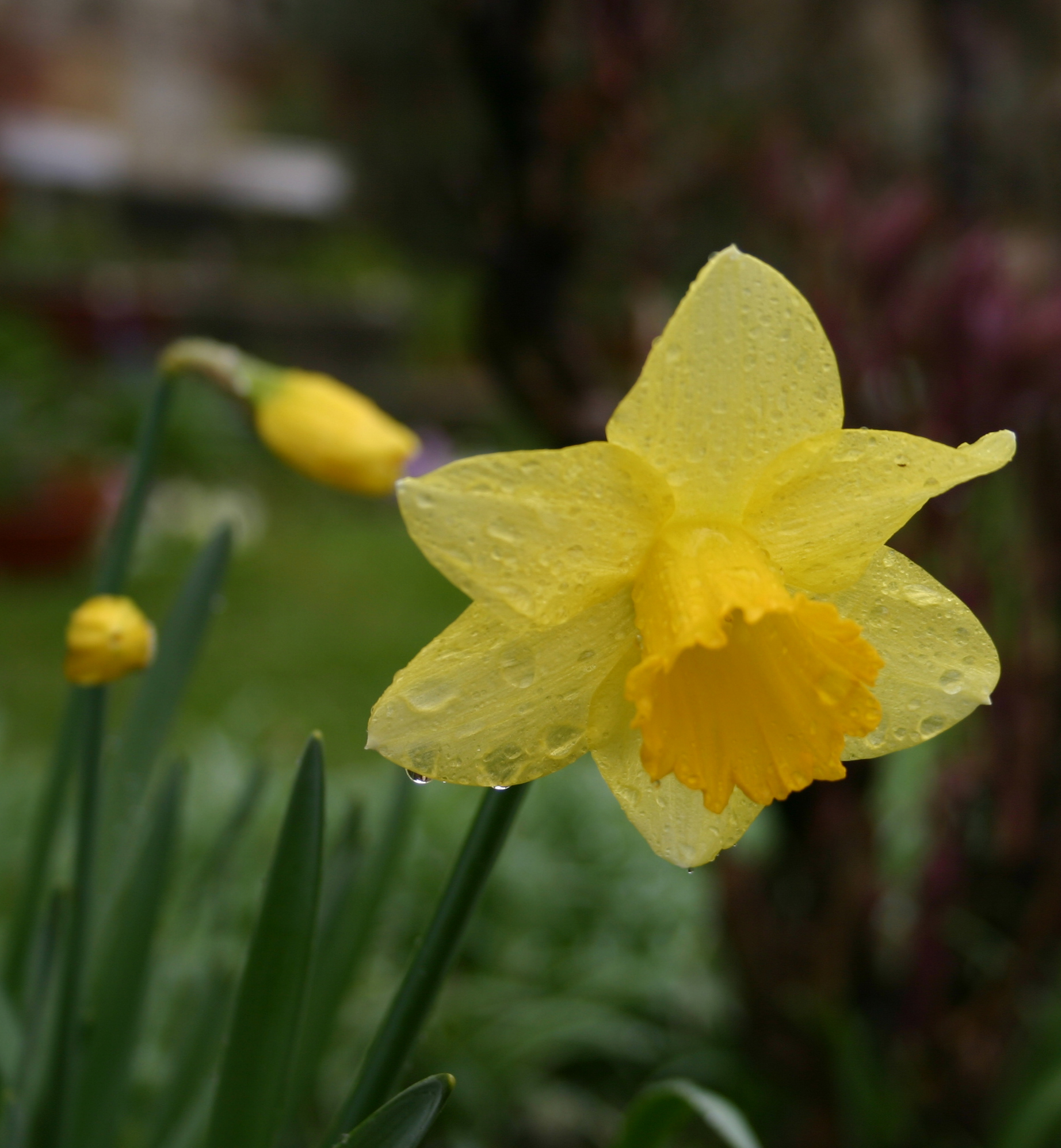
The Daffodil, the floral emblem of March

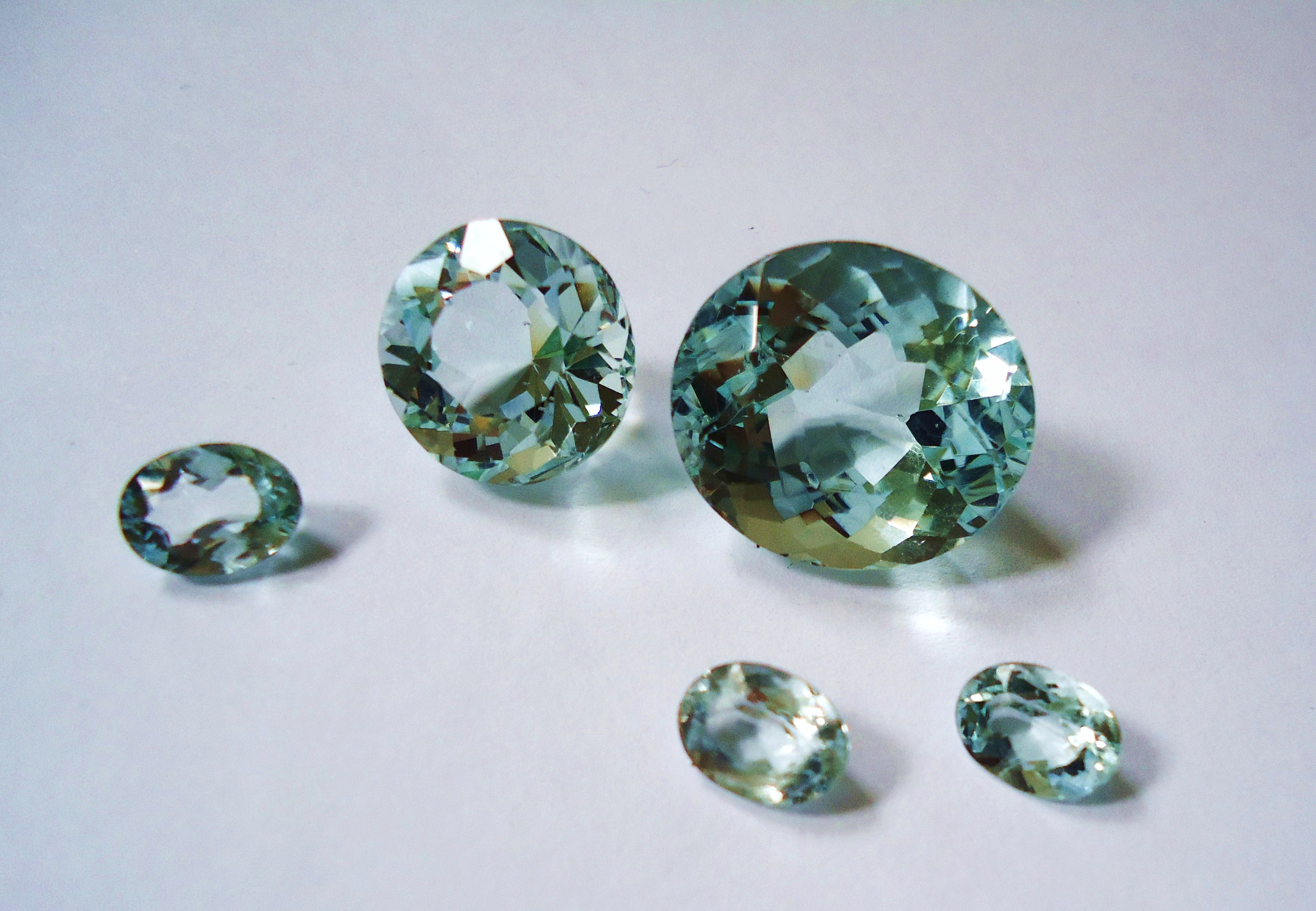
Aquamarine gemstones

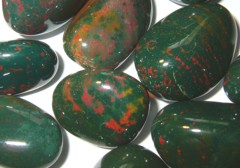
Polished bloodstones

March's birthstones are aquamarine and bloodstone. These stones symbolize courage. Its birth flower is the daffodil. The zodiac signs are Pisces until approximately March 20 and Aries from approximately March 21 onward.

== Observances ==
This list does not necessarily imply either official status or general observance.

=== Month-long ===
- In Catholic tradition, March is the Month of Saint Joseph.
- Endometriosis Awareness Month (International observance)
- National Nutrition Month (Canada)
- Season for Nonviolence: January 30 – April 4 (International observance)
- Women's History Month (Australia, United Kingdom, United States)
- Women's Role in History Month (Philippines)

==== American ====
- Cerebral Palsy Awareness Month
- Irish-American Heritage Month
- Multiple Sclerosis Awareness Month
- Music in our Schools Month
- National Athletic Training Month
- National Bleeding Disorders Awareness Month
- National Celery Month
- National Frozen Food Month
- National Kidney Month
- National Nutrition Month
- National Professional Social Work Month
- National Reading Awareness Month
- Youth Art Month

=== Non-Gregorian ===
(All Baháʼí, Islamic, and Jewish observances begin at the sundown prior to the date listed, and end at sundown of the date in question unless otherwise noted.)

- List of observances set by the Baháʼí calendar
- List of observances set by the Chinese calendar
- List of observances set by the Hebrew calendar
- List of observances set by the Islamic calendar
- List of observances set by the Solar Hijri calendar

=== Movable ===
- List of movable Eastern Christian observances
- List of movable Western Christian observances
- National Corndog Day (United States): March 21
- Equal Pay Day (United States): March 31

==== First Sunday ====
- Children's Day (New Zealand)

==== First week, March 1 to 7 ====
- Global Money Week

==== School day closest to March 2 ====
- Read Across America Day

==== First Monday ====
- Casimir Pulaski Day (United States)

==== First Tuesday ====
- Grandmother's Day (France)

==== First Thursday ====
- World Book Day (UK and Ireland)
- World Maths Day

==== First Friday ====
- Employee Appreciation Day (United States, Canada)

==== Second Sunday ====
- Daylight saving time begins (United States and Canada)

==== Week of March 8: March 8–14 ====
- Women of Aviation Worldwide Week

==== Monday closest to March 9, unless March 9 falls on a Saturday ====
- Baron Bliss Day (Belize)

==== Second Monday ====
- Canberra Day (Australia)
- Commonwealth Day (Commonwealth of Nations)

==== Second Wednesday ====
- Decoration Day (Liberia)
- No Smoking Day (United Kingdom)

==== Second Thursday ====
- World Kidney Day

==== Friday of the second full week of March ====
- World Sleep Day

==== Third week in March ====
- National Poison Prevention Week (United States)

==== Third Monday ====
- Birthday of Benito Juarez (Mexico)

==== March 19th, unless the 19th is a Sunday, then March 20 ====
- Feast of Joseph of Nazareth (Western Christianity)
  - Father's Day (Spain, Portugal, Italy, Honduras, and Bolivia)
  - Las Fallas, celebrated on the week leading to March 19. (Valencia)
  - "Return of the Swallow", annual observance of the swallows' return to Mission San Juan Capistrano in California.

==== Third Wednesday ====
- National Festival of Trees (Netherlands)

==== March equinox: c. March 20 ====
- Nowruz, The Iranian new year. (Observed Internationally)
- Chunfen (East Asia)
- Dísablót (some Asatru groups)
- Earth Equinox Day
- Equinox of the Gods/New Year (Thelema)
- Higan (Japan)
- International Astrology Day
- Mabon (Southern Hemisphere) (Neo-paganism)
- Ostara (Northern Hemisphere) (Neo-paganism)
- Shunbun no Hi (Japan)
- Sigrblót (The Troth)
- Summer Finding (Asatru Free Assembly)
- Sun-Earth Day (United States)
- Vernal Equinox Day/Kōreisai (Japan)
- World Storytelling Day

==== Fourth Monday ====
- Labour Day (Christmas Island, Australia)

==== Fourth Tuesday ====
- American Diabetes Alert Day (United States)

==== Last Saturday ====
- Earth Hour (International observance)

==== Last Sunday ====
- European Summer Time begins

==== Last Monday ====
- Seward's Day (Alaska, United States)

=== Fixed ===
- March 1
  - Baba Marta (Bulgaria),
  - Beer Day (Iceland)
  - Commemoration of Mustafa Barzani's Death (Iraqi Kurdistan)
  - Heroes' Day (Paraguay)
  - Independence Day (Bosnia and Herzegovina)
  - Mărțișor (Romania and Moldavia)
  - National Pig Day (United States)
  - Remembrance Day (Marshall Islands)
  - Saint David's Day (Wales)
  - Samiljeol (South Korea)
  - Self-injury Awareness Day (International observance)
  - World Civil Defence Day
- March 2
  - National Banana Creme Pie Day (United States)
  - National Reading Day (United States)
  - Omizu-okuri ("Water Carrying") Festival (Obama, Japan)
  - Peasant's Day (Burma)
  - Texas Independence Day (Texas, United States)
  - Victory at Adwa Day (Ethiopia)
- March 3
  - Hinamatsuri (Japan)
  - Liberation Day (Bulgaria)
  - Martyr's Day (Malawi)
  - Mother's Day (Georgia)
  - National Canadian Bacon Day (United States)
  - Sportsmen's Day (Egypt)
  - World Wildlife Day
- March 4
  - National Grammar Day (United States)
  - St Casimir's Day (Poland and Lithuania)
- March 5
  - Custom Chief's Day (Vanuatu)
  - Day of Physical Culture and Sport (Azerbaijan)
  - Learn from Lei Feng Day (China)
  - National Absinthe Day (United States)
  - National Cheez Doodle Day (United States)
  - St Piran's Day (Cornwall)
- March 6
  - European Day of the Righteous (Europe)
  - Foundation Day (Norfolk Island)
  - Independence Day (Ghana)
- March 7
  - Liberation of Sulaymaniyah (Iraqi Kurdistan)
  - National Crown Roast of Pork Day (United States)
  - Teacher's Day (Albania)
- March 8
  - International Women's Day
    - International Women's Collaboration Brew Day
    - Mother's Day (primarily Eastern Europe, Russia, and the former Soviet bloc)
  - National Peanut Cluster Day (United States)
  - National Potato Salad Day (United States)
- March 9
  - National Crabmeat Day (United States)
  - National Meatball Day (United States)
  - Teachers' Day (Lebanon)
- March 10
  - Harriet Tubman Day (United States of America)
  - Holocaust Remembrance Day (Bulgaria)
  - Hote Matsuri (Shiogama, Japan)
  - International Day of Women Judges (International observance)
  - National Blueberry Popover Day (United States)
  - National Mario Day (United States)
  - National Women and Girls HIV/AIDS Awareness Day (United States)
  - Tibetan Uprising Day (Tibetan independence movement)
- March 11
  - Day of Restoration of Independence of Lithuania
  - Johnny Appleseed Day (United States)
  - Moshoeshoe Day (Lesotho)
  - Oatmeal Nut Waffles Day (United States)
- March 12
  - Arbor Day (China)
  - Arbor Day (Taiwan)
  - Aztec New Year
  - Girl Scout Birthday (United States)
  - National Baked Scallops Day (United States)
  - National Day (Mauritius)
  - Tree Day (North Macedonia)
  - World Day Against Cyber Censorship
  - Youth Day (Zambia)
- March 13
  - Anniversary of the election of Pope Francis (Vatican City)
  - Kasuga Matsuri (Kasuga Grand Shrine, Nara, Japan)
  - L. Ron Hubbard's birthday (Scientology)
  - Liberation of Duhok City (Iraqi Kurdistan)
  - National Coconut Torte Day (United States)
- March 14
  - Multiple Sclerosis Awareness Week March 14 to March 20 (United States)
  - Pi Day
  - White Day (Asia)
- March 15
  - Hōnen Matsuri (Japan)
  - International Day Against Police Brutality
  - J. J. Roberts' Birthday (Liberia)
  - National Day (Hungary)
  - World Consumer Rights Day
  - World Contact Day
  - World Day of Muslim Culture, Peace, Dialogue and Film
  - World Speech Day
  - Youth Day (Palau)
- March 16
  - Day of the Book Smugglers (Lithuania)
  - Remembrance day of the Latvian legionnaires (Latvia)
  - Halabja Day (Iraqi Kurdistan)
  - Saint Urho's Day (Finnish Americans and Finnish Canadians)
- March 17
  - Children's Day (Bangladesh)
  - Evacuation Day (Massachusetts) (Suffolk County, Massachusetts)
  - Saint Patrick's Day (Ireland, Irish diaspora)
- March 18
  - Anniversary of the Oil Expropriation (Mexico)
  - Flag Day (Aruba)
  - Gallipoli Memorial Day (Turkey)
  - Men's and Soldiers' Day (Mongolia)
  - Teacher's Day (Syria)
- March 19
  - Kashubian Unity Day (Poland)
  - Minna Canth Day (Finland)
- March 20
  - Feast of the Supreme Ritual (Thelema)
  - Great American Meatout (United States)
  - International Day of Happiness (United Nations)
  - Independence Day (Tunisia)
  - International Francophonie Day (Organisation internationale de la Francophonie), and its related observance:
    - UN French Language Day (United Nations)
  - Liberation of Kirkuk City (Iraqi Kurdistan)
  - National Native HIV/AIDS Awareness Day (United States)
  - World Sparrow Day
- March 21
  - Arbor Day (Portugal)
  - Birth of Benito Juárez, a Fiestas Patrias (Mexico)
  - Harmony Day (Australia)
  - Human Rights Day (South Africa)
  - Independence Day (Namibia)
  - International Colour Day (International observance)
  - International Day for the Elimination of Racial Discrimination (International observance)
  - International Day of Forests (International observance)
  - Mother's Day (most of the Arab world)
  - National Tree Planting Day (Lesotho)
  - Truant's Day (Poland, Faroe Islands)
  - World Down Syndrome Day (International observance)
  - World Poetry Day (International observance)
  - World Puppetry Day (International observance)
  - Youth Day (Tunisia)
- March 22
  - Emancipation Day (Puerto Rico)
  - World Water Day
- March 23
  - Day of the Sea (Bolivia)
  - Ministry of Environment and Natural Resources Day (Azerbaijan)
  - National Chips and Dip Day (United States)
  - Pakistan Day (Pakistan)
  - Promised Messiah Day (Ahmadiyya)
  - World Meteorological Day
- March 24
  - Commonwealth Covenant Day (Northern Mariana Islands, United States)
  - Day of Remembrance for Truth and Justice (Argentina)
  - Day of National Revolution (Kyrgyzstan)
  - International Day for the Right to the Truth Concerning Gross Human Rights Violations and for the Dignity of Victims (United Nations)
  - National Tree Planting Day (Uganda)
  - Student Day (Scientology)
  - World Tuberculosis Day
- March 25
  - Anniversary of the Arengo and the Feast of the Militants (San Marino)
  - Cultural Workers Day (Russia)
  - Empress Menen's Birthday (Rastafari)
  - EU Talent Day (European Union)
  - Feast of the Annunciation (Christianity), and its related observances:
    - Lady Day (United Kingdom) (see Quarter Days)
    - International Day of the Unborn Child (international)
    - Mother's Day (Slovenia)
    - Waffle Day (Sweden)
  - Freedom Day (Belarus)
  - International Day of Remembrance of the Victims of Slavery and the Transatlantic Slave Trade
  - International Day of Solidarity with Detained and Missing Staff Members (United Nations General Assembly)
  - Maryland Day (Maryland, United States)
  - Revolution Day (Greece)
  - Struggle for Human Rights Day (Slovakia)
  - Tolkien Reading Day (Tolkien fandom)
- March 26
  - Independence Day (Bangladesh)
  - Khordad Sal (Zoroastrianism)
  - Martyr's Day or Day of Democracy (Mali)
  - Prince Kūhiō Day (Hawaii, United States)
  - Purple Day (Canada and United States)
- March 27
  - Armed Forces Day (Myanmar)
  - International whisk(e)y day
  - World Theatre Day (International)
- March 28
  - Commemoration of Sen no Rikyū (Schools of Japanese tea ceremony)
  - Serfs Emancipation Day (Tibet)
  - Teachers' Day (Czech Republic and Slovakia)
- March 29
  - Boganda Day (Central African Republic)
  - Commemoration of the 1947 Rebellion (Madagascar)
  - Day of the Young Combatant (Chile)
  - Youth Day (Taiwan)
- March 30
  - Land Day (Palestine)
  - National Doctors' Day (United States)
  - Spiritual Baptist/Shouter Liberation Day (Trinidad and Tobago)
  - World Idli Day
- March 31
  - César Chávez Day (United States)
  - Culture Day (Public holidays in the Federated States of Micronesia)
  - Day of Genocide of Azerbaijanis (Azerbaijan)
  - Freedom Day (Malta)
  - International Transgender Day of Visibility
  - King Nangklao Memorial Day (Thailand)
  - National Backup Day (United States)
  - National Clams on the Half Shell Day (United States)
  - Thomas Mundy Peterson Day (New Jersey, United States)
  - Transfer Day (US Virgin Islands)
