= March 25 =

March 25 this year in various calendars
- Wednesday, 25 March 2026
Akan	Nwonawukuo
Armenian	8 Ahekani 1475
Aztec	Huei Tecuilhuitl 14, 10 Ehēcatl
Babylonian	5 Adaru, 2336 SE
Balinese pawukon	Menga, Beteng, Laba, Umanis, Aryang, Buda of Dukut, Brahma, Tulus, Suka
Bengali	11 Chaitro, BS 1432
Chinese	Yang Earth Dog・Three Stars Mansion; Fire Horse Year, Month 2, Day 7 (Chunfen, 11 days until Qingming)
Common Era	25 March 2026 CE
Coptic	16 Paremhat, AM 1742
Egyptian	13 Mesori, 2774 NE
Ethiopian	16 Magābit, 2018 Amätä Məhrät
French Republican	Décade I, Quintidi de Germinal de l'Année 234 de la République
Gregorian	25 March, AD 2026
Hebrew	7 Nisan, AM 5786
Hindu	Mṛgaśiras・Ayuṣmān; Solar: 12 Caitra, 1947 SE; Lunisolar: Saptamī, Śukla pakṣa of Caitra, 2083 VE; Rāudra・5126 KY・1,872,659
Icelandic	Miðvikudagur, 2 Einmánuður 2025
Islamic	6 Shawwal, AH 1447 (using tabular method)
ISO week date	2026-W13-3
Japanese	7 Kisaragi, Reiwa 8 (Shunbun, 11 days until Seimei)
Julian	12 March, AD 2026 (AM 7534)
Julian day	2461125
Korean	7 Tokkidal, 4359 DE
Maya	13.0.13.8.2; 0 Uayeb, 10 Ik
Roman	ante diem IV Idus Martias, MMDCCLXXIX AUC
Solar Hijri	5 Farvardin, SH 1405
Tibetan	7 dbo, me pho rta 2153 or 1772 or 1000

<<	March					>>
Su	Mo	Tu	We	Th	Fr	Sa
1	2	3	4	5	6	7
8	9	10	11	12	13	14
15	16	17	18	19	20	21
22	23	24	25	26	27	28
29	30	31
2026

March 25 in recent years
2026 (Wednesday)
2025 (Tuesday)
2024 (Monday)
2023 (Saturday)
2022 (Friday)
2021 (Thursday)
2020 (Wednesday)
2019 (Monday)
2018 (Sunday)
2017 (Saturday)

March 25 is the 84th day of the year (85th in leap years) in the Gregorian calendar; 281 days remain until the end of the year.

In Annunciation Style dating, the year begins on March 25. Until 1752, March 25 was the official date of the beginning of the year in England and its dominions.

== Events ==
=== Pre-1600 ===
- 410 – The Southern Yan capital of Guanggu falls to the Jin dynasty general Liu Yu, ending the Southern Yan dynasty.
- 421 – Italian city Venice is founded with the dedication of the first church, that of San Giacomo di Rialto on the islet of Rialto.
- 708 – Election of Pope Constantine following the death of Pope Sisinnius. He would be the last pope to visit Constantinople until 1967.
- 717 – Theodosius III resigns the throne to the Byzantine Empire to enter a monastery, allowing Leo III to take the throne and begin the Isaurian dynasty.
- 919 – Romanos Lekapenos seizes the Boukoleon Palace in Constantinople and becomes regent of the Byzantine emperor Constantine VII.
- 1000 – Fatimid caliph al-Hakim bi-Amr Allah assassinates the eunuch chief minister Barjawan and assumes control of the government.
- 1065 – The Great German Pilgrimage is attacked on Good Friday by Beduin bandits, suffering heavy losses.
- 1221 – Coronation of Robert of Courtenay as Emperor of the Latin Empire.
- 1306 – Robert the Bruce becomes King of Scots (Scotland).
- 1409 – The Council of Pisa convenes, in an attempt to heal the Western Schism.
- 1410 – The Yongle Emperor of Ming China launches the first of his military campaigns against the Mongols, resulting in the fall of the Mongol khan Bunyashiri.
- 1519 – Hernán Cortés, entering province of Tabasco, defeats Tabascan Indians.
- 1576 – Jerome Savage takes out a sub-lease to start the Newington Butts Theatre outside London.
- 1584 – Sir Walter Raleigh is granted a patent to colonize Virginia.

=== 1601–1900 ===
- 1655 – Saturn's largest moon, Titan, is discovered by Christiaan Huygens.
- 1708 – A French fleet anchors nears Fife Ness as part of the planned French invasion of Britain.
- 1725 – Bach's chorale cantata "Wie schön leuchtet der Morgenstern, BWV 1", is first performed on the Feast of the Annunciation, coinciding with Palm Sunday.
- 1770 – Daskalogiannis leads the people of Sfakia in the first Greek uprising against the Ottoman rule
- 1776 – American Revolutionary War: American Patriots conduct a Raid on Tybee Island, primarily seeking to capture runaway slaves who sought refuge with British forces stationed there.
- 1802 – The Treaty of Amiens is signed as a "Definitive Treaty of Peace" between France and the United Kingdom.
- 1807 – The Swansea and Mumbles Railway, then known as the Oystermouth Railway, becomes the first passenger-carrying railway in the world.
- 1811 – Percy Bysshe Shelley is expelled from the University of Oxford for publishing the pamphlet The Necessity of Atheism.
- 1821 – Greek War of Independence: Traditional date of the start of the Greek War of Independence. The war had actually begun on 23 February 1821 (Julian calendar).
- 1845 – New Zealand Legislative Council pass the first Militia Act constituting the New Zealand Army.
- 1865 – American Civil War: In Virginia during the Siege of Petersburg, Confederate forces temporarily capture Fort Stedman from the Union before being repulsed.
- 1878 – Last issue of the Bulletin de la Fédération jurassienne, the first or one of the first anarchist newspapers.
- 1894 – Coxey's Army, the first significant American protest march, departs Massillon, Ohio for Washington, D.C.

=== 1901–present ===
- 1905 – The Greek football club P.A.E. G.S. Diagoras is founded in the city of Rhodes.
- 1911 – In New York City, the Triangle Shirtwaist Factory fire kills 146 garment workers.
- 1911 – Andrey Yushchinsky is murdered in Kiev, leading to the Beilis affair.
- 1914 – The Greek multi-sport club Aris Thessaloniki is founded in Thessaloniki.
- 1917 – The Georgian Orthodox Church restores its autocephaly abolished by Imperial Russia in 1811.
- 1918 – The Belarusian People's Republic is established.
- 1919 – The Tetiev pogrom occurs in Ukraine, becoming the prototype of mass murder during the Holocaust.
- 1924 – On the anniversary of Greek Independence, Alexandros Papanastasiou proclaims the Second Hellenic Republic.
- 1931 – The Scottsboro Boys are arrested in Alabama and charged with rape.
- 1932 – The Tomb of the Unknown Soldier is unveiled in Athens.
- 1941 – The Kingdom of Yugoslavia joins the Axis powers with the signing of the Tripartite Pact.
- 1947 – An explosion in a coal mine in Centralia, Illinois kills 111.
- 1948 – The first successful tornado forecast predicts that a tornado will strike Tinker Air Force Base, Oklahoma.
- 1949 – More than 92,000 kulaks are suddenly deported from the Baltic states to Siberia.
- 1957 – United States Customs seizes copies of Allen Ginsberg's poem "Howl" on obscenity grounds.
- 1957 – The European Economic Community is established with West Germany, France, Italy, Belgium, Netherlands and Luxembourg as the first members.
- 1959 – Chain Island is sold by the State of California to Russell Gallaway III, a Sacramento businessman who plans to use it as a "hunting and fishing retreat", for $5,258.20 ($58,072 in 2025).
- 1965 – Civil rights activists led by Martin Luther King Jr. successfully complete their four-day 50-mile (80 km) march from Selma to the capitol in Montgomery, Alabama.
- 1971 – The Army of the Republic of Vietnam abandon an attempt to cut off the Ho Chi Minh trail in Laos.
- 1975 – Faisal of Saudi Arabia is shot and killed by his nephew.
- 1979 – The first fully functional Space Shuttle orbiter, Columbia, is delivered to the John F. Kennedy Space Center to be prepared for its first launch.
- 1988 – The Candle demonstration in Bratislava is the first mass demonstration of the 1980s against the communist regime in Czechoslovakia.
- 1995 – WikiWikiWeb, the world's first wiki, and part of the Portland Pattern Repository, is made public by Ward Cunningham.
- 1996 – The European Union's Veterinarian Committee bans the export of British beef and its by-products as a result of mad cow disease (Bovine spongiform encephalopathy).
- 2006 – Capitol Hill massacre: A gunman kills six people before taking his own life at a party in Seattle's Capitol Hill neighborhood.
- 2006 – Protesters demanding a new election in Belarus, following the rigged 2006 Belarusian presidential election, clash with riot police. Opposition leader Aleksander Kozulin is among several protesters arrested.
- 2018 – Syrian civil war: Following the completion of the Afrin offensive, the Syrian Democratic Forces (SDF) initiate an insurgency against the Turkish occupation of the Afrin District.

== Births ==
=== Pre-1600 ===
- 1252 – Conradin, Duke of Swabia (died 1268)
- 1259 – Andronikos II Palaiologos, Byzantine emperor (died 1332)
- 1297 – Andronikos III Palaiologos, Byzantine emperor (died 1341)
- 1297 – Arnošt of Pardubice, the first Bohemian archbishop (died 1364)
- 1345 – Blanche of Lancaster (died 1369)
- 1347 – Catherine of Siena, Italian philosopher, theologian, and saint (died 1380)
- 1404 – John Beaufort, 1st Duke of Somerset, English military leader (died 1444)
- 1414 – Thomas Clifford, 8th Baron de Clifford, English noble (died 1455)
- 1434 – Eustochia Smeralda Calafato, Italian saint (died 1485)
- 1479 – Vasili III of Russia (died 1533)
- 1491 – Marie d'Albret, Countess of Rethel (died 1549)
- 1510 – Guillaume Postel, French linguist (died 1581)
- 1538 – Christopher Clavius, German mathematician and astronomer (died 1612)
- 1541 – Francesco I de' Medici, Grand Duke of Tuscany (died 1587)
- 1545 – John II, Duke of Schleswig-Holstein-Sonderburg (died 1622)
- 1546 – Giacomo Castelvetro, Italian writer (died 1616)
- 1593 – Jean de Brébeuf, French missionary and saint (died 1649)

=== 1601–1900 ===
- 1611 – Evliya Çelebi, Ottoman Turk traveller and writer (died 1682)
- 1636 – Henric Piccardt, Dutch lawyer (died 1712)
- 1643 – Louis Moréri, French priest and scholar (died 1680)
- 1661 – Paul de Rapin, French soldier and historian (died 1725)
- 1699 – Johann Adolph Hasse, German singer and composer (died 1783)
- 1741 – Jean-Antoine Houdon, French sculptor and educator (died 1828)
- 1745 – John Barry, Irish-American naval officer and father of the American navy (died 1803)
- 1767 – Joachim Murat, French general (died 1815)
- 1782 – Caroline Bonaparte, French daughter of Carlo Buonaparte (died 1839)
- 1800 – Ernst Heinrich Karl von Dechen, German geologist and academic (died 1889)
- 1808 – José de Espronceda, Spanish poet and author (died 1842)
- 1824 – Clinton L. Merriam, American banker and politician (died 1900)
- 1828 – George Montgomery White, American politician (died 1860)
- 1840 – Myles Keogh, Irish-American colonel (died 1876)
- 1859 – Hendrik Wortman, Dutch civil engineer (died 1939)
- 1863 – Simon Flexner, American physician and academic (died 1946)
- 1867 – Gutzon Borglum, American sculptor, designed Mount Rushmore (died 1941)
- 1867 – Arturo Toscanini, Italian-American cellist and conductor (died 1957)
- 1868 – Bill Lockwood, English cricketer (died 1932)
- 1871 – Louis Perrée, French fencer (died 1924)
- 1872 – Horatio Nelson Jackson, American race car driver and physician (died 1955)
- 1873 – Rudolf Rocker, German-American author and activist (died 1958)
- 1874 – Selim Sırrı Tarcan, Turkish educator and politician (died 1957)
- 1876 – Irving Baxter, American high jumper and pole vaulter (died 1957)
- 1877 – Walter Little, Canadian politician (died 1961)
- 1878 – František Janda-Suk, Czech discus thrower and shot putter (died 1955)
- 1879 – Amedee Reyburn, American swimmer and water polo player (died 1920)
- 1881 – Béla Bartók, Hungarian pianist and composer (died 1945)
- 1881 – Patrick Henry Bruce, American painter and educator (died 1936)
- 1881 – Mary Webb, English author and poet (died 1927)
- 1893 – Johannes Villemson, Estonian runner (died 1971)
- 1895 – Siegfried Handloser, German general and physician (died 1954)
- 1885 – Jimmy Seed, English international footballer and manager (died 1966)
- 1897 – Leslie Averill, New Zealand doctor and soldier (died 1981)
- 1899 – François Rozet, French-Canadian actor (died 1994)
- 1900 – George Carstairs, Australian rugby league player (died 1966)

=== 1901–present ===
- 1901 – Ed Begley, American actor (died 1970)
- 1903 – Binnie Barnes, English-American actress (died 1998)
- 1903 – Frankie Carle, American pianist and bandleader (died 2001)
- 1903 – Nahum Norbert Glatzer, Ukrainian-American theologian and scholar (died 1990)
- 1904 – Pete Johnson, American boogie-woogie and jazz pianist (died 1967)
- 1905 – Albrecht Mertz von Quirnheim, German colonel (died 1944)
- 1906 – Jean Sablon, French singer and actor (died 1994)
- 1906 – A. J. P. Taylor, English historian and academic (died 1990)
- 1908 – David Lean, English director, producer, and screenwriter (died 1991)
- 1910 – Magda Olivero, Italian soprano (died 2014)
- 1910 – Benzion Netanyahu, Polish-Israeli historian and academic (died 2012)
- 1912 – Melita Norwood, English civil servant and spy (died 2005)
- 1912 – Jean Vilar, French actor and director (died 1971)
- 1913 – Reo Stakis, Cypriot-Scottish businessman, founded Stakis Hotels (died 2001)
- 1914 – Norman Borlaug, American agronomist and humanitarian, Nobel Prize laureate (died 2009)
- 1914 – Tassos, Greek engraver, etcher and sculptor (died 1985)
- 1915 – Dorothy Squires, Welsh singer (died 1998)
- 1916 – S. M. Pandit, Indian painter and educator (died 1993)
- 1918 – Howard Cosell, American soldier, journalist, and author (died 1995)
- 1920 – Paul Scott, English author, poet, and playwright (died 1978)
- 1920 – Patrick Troughton, English actor (died 1987)
- 1920 – Usha Mehta, Gandhian and freedom fighter of India (died 2000)
- 1921 – Nancy Kelly, American actress (died 1995)
- 1921 – Simone Signoret, French actress (died 1985)
- 1921 – Alexandra of Yugoslavia, the last Queen of Yugoslavia (died 1993)
- 1922 – Eileen Ford, American businesswoman, co-founded Ford Models (died 2014)
- 1923 – Bonnie Guitar, American singer-songwriter and guitarist (died 2019)
- 1923 – Wim van Est, Dutch cyclist (died 2003)
- 1924 – Roberts Blossom, American actor (died 2011)
- 1924 – Machiko Kyō, Japanese actress (died 2019)
- 1925 – Flannery O'Connor, American short story writer and novelist (died 1964)
- 1925 – Anthony Quinton, Baron Quinton, English physician and philosopher (died 2010)
- 1925 – Kishori Sinha, Indian politician, social activist and advocate (died 2016)
- 1926 – Riz Ortolani, Italian composer and conductor (died 2014)
- 1926 – László Papp, Hungarian boxer (died 2003)
- 1926 – Shirley Jean Rickert, American actress (died 2009)
- 1926 – Jaime Sabines, Mexican poet and politician (died 1999)
- 1926 – Gene Shalit, American journalist and critic (died 2026)
- 1927 – P. Shanmugam, Indian politician, 13th Chief Minister of Puducherry (died 2013)
- 1928 – Jim Lovell, American captain, pilot, and astronaut (died 2025)
- 1928 – Gunnar Nielsen, Danish runner and typographer (died 1985)
- 1928 – Peter O'Brien, Australian rugby league player (died 2016)
- 1928 – Hans Steinbrenner, German sculptor (died 2008)
- 1929 – Cecil Taylor, American pianist and composer (died 2018)
- 1930 – David Burge, American pianist, composer, and conductor (died 2013)
- 1930 – Carlo Mauri, Italian mountaineer and explorer (died 1982)
- 1930 – Rudy Minarcin, American baseball player and coach (died 2013)
- 1931 – Humphrey Burton, English radio and television host (died 2025)
- 1932 – Penelope Gilliatt, English novelist, short story writer, and critic (died 1993)
- 1932 – Wes Santee, American runner (died 2010)
- 1934 – Johnny Burnette, American singer-songwriter (died 1964)
- 1934 – Bernard King, Australian actor and chef (died 2002)
- 1934 – Karlheinz Schreiber, German-Canadian businessman
- 1934 – Gloria Steinem, American feminist activist, co-founded the Women's Media Center (died 2026)
- 1935 – Gabriel Elorde, Filipino boxer (died 1985)
- 1936 – Carl Kaufmann, American-German sprinter (died 2008)
- 1937 – Tom Monaghan, American businessman, founded Domino's Pizza
- 1938 – Hoyt Axton, American singer-songwriter and actor (died 1999)
- 1938 – Daniel Buren, French sculptor and painter
- 1938 – Fritz d'Orey, Brazilian racing driver (died 2020)
- 1939 – Toni Cade Bambara, American author, academic, and activist (died 1995)
- 1939 – D. C. Fontana, American screenwriter and producer (died 2019)
- 1941 – Gudmund Hernes, Norwegian sociologist and politician, Norwegian Minister of Education and Research
- 1942 – Robert J. Birgeneau, Canadian-American physicist
- 1942 – Aretha Franklin, American singer-songwriter and pianist (died 2018)
- 1942 – Richard O'Brien, English actor and screenwriter
- 1942 – Kim Woodburn, English television host (died 2025)
- 1943 – Paul Michael Glaser, American actor and director
- 1945 – Leila Diniz, Brazilian actress (died 1972)
- 1946 – Cliff Balsom, English footballer
- 1946 – Daniel Bensaïd, French philosopher and author (died 2010)
- 1946 – Stephen Hunter, American author and critic
- 1946 – Maurice Krafft, French volcanologist (died 1991)
- 1947 – Richard Cork, English historian and critic
- 1947 – Elton John, English singer-songwriter, pianist, producer, and actor
- 1948 – Bonnie Bedelia, American actress
- 1948 – Michael Stanley, American singer-songwriter and guitarist (died 2021)
- 1949 – Ronnie Flanagan, Northern Irish Chief Constable (Royal Irish Constabulary, Police Service of Northern Ireland)
- 1949 – Sue Klebold, American activist
- 1950 – Chuck Greenberg, American saxophonist, songwriter, and producer (died 1995)
- 1950 – Ronnie McDowell, American singer-songwriter
- 1950 – David Paquette, American-New Zealander pianist
- 1951 – Jumbo Tsuruta, Japanese wrestler (died 2000)
- 1952 – Stephen Dorrell, English soldier and politician, Secretary of State for Health
- 1952 – Antanas Mockus, Colombian mathematician, philosopher, and politician, Mayor of Bogotá
- 1953 – Christos Ardizoglou, Greek footballer
- 1953 – Robert Fox, English producer and manager
- 1953 – Vesna Pusić, Croatian sociologist and politician, Deputy Prime Minister of Croatia
- 1953 – Haroon Rasheed, Pakistani cricketer and coach
- 1954 – Thom Loverro, American journalist and author
- 1955 – Daniel Boulud, French chef and author
- 1955 – Lee Mazzilli, American baseball player, coach, and manager
- 1957 – Christina Boxer, English runner and journalist
- 1957 – Kanellos Kanellopoulos, Greek cyclist
- 1957 – Jonathan Michie, English economist and academic
- 1957 – Aleksandr Puchkov, Russian hurdler
- 1957 – Jim Uhls, American screenwriter and producer
- 1958 – Susie Bright, American journalist, author, and critic
- 1958 – Lorna Brown, Canadian artist, curator, and writer
- 1958 – Sisy Chen, Taiwanese journalist and politician
- 1958 – María Caridad Colón, Cuban javelin thrower and shot putter
- 1958 – John Ensign, American physician and politician
- 1958 – Ray Tanner, American baseball player and coach
- 1958 – Åsa Torstensson, Swedish politician, 3rd Swedish Minister for Infrastructure
- 1960 – Mike Aulby, American bowler
- 1960 – Steve Norman, English saxophonist, songwriter, and producer
- 1960 – Peter O'Brien, Australian actor
- 1960 – Brenda Strong, American actress
- 1961 – Mark Brooks, American golfer
- 1962 – Marcia Cross, American actress
- 1962 – David Nuttall, English lawyer and politician
- 1963 – Karen Bruce, English dancer and choreographer
- 1963 – Velle Kadalipp, Estonian architect
- 1963 – Andrew O'Connor, British actor, comedian, magician, television presenter and executive producer
- 1964 – Norm Duke, American bowler
- 1964 – Buzz Osborne, American musician
- 1964 – René Meulensteen, Dutch footballer and coach
- 1964 – Ken Wregget, Canadian ice hockey player
- 1965 – Avery Johnson, American basketball player and coach
- 1965 – Stefka Kostadinova, Bulgarian high jumper
- 1965 – Sarah Jessica Parker, American actress, producer, and designer
- 1966 – Tom Glavine, American baseball player
- 1966 – Humberto Gonzalez, Mexican boxer
- 1966 – Jeff Healey, Canadian singer-songwriter and guitarist (died 2008)
- 1966 – Anton Rogan, Northern Irish footballer
- 1967 – Matthew Barney, American sculptor and photographer
- 1967 – Doug Stanhope, American comedian and actor
- 1967 – Debi Thomas, American figure skater and physician
- 1969 – George Chlitsios, Greek conductor and composer
- 1969 – Dale Davis, American basketball player
- 1969 – Cathy Dennis, English singer-songwriter, record producer and actress
- 1969 – Jeffrey Walker, English singer-songwriter and bass player
- 1970 – Magnus Larsson, Swedish tennis player
- 1971 – Stacy Dragila, American pole vaulter and coach
- 1971 – Cammi Granato, American ice hockey player and sportscaster
- 1971 – Sheryl Swoopes, American basketball player and coach
- 1972 – Naftali Bennett, Israeli politician, 13th Prime Minister of Israel
- 1972 – Giniel de Villiers, South African racing driver
- 1972 – Phil O'Donnell, Scottish footballer (died 2007)
- 1973 – Michaela Dorfmeister, Austrian skier
- 1973 – Anders Fridén, Swedish singer-songwriter and producer
- 1973 – Bob Sura, American basketball player
- 1974 – Serge Betsen, Cameroonian-French rugby player
- 1974 – Lark Voorhies, American actress and singer
- 1975 – Ladislav Benýšek, Czech ice hockey player
- 1975 – Melanie Blatt, English singer-songwriter and actress
- 1975 – Erika Heynatz, Papua New Guinean-Australian model and actress
- 1976 – Francie Bellew, Irish footballer
- 1976 – Lars Figura, German sprinter
- 1976 – Wladimir Klitschko, Ukrainian boxer
- 1976 – Rima Wakarua, New Zealand-Italian rugby player
- 1977 – Natalie Clein, English cellist and educator
- 1977 – Andrew Lindsay, Scottish rower
- 1978 – Gennaro Delvecchio, Italian footballer
- 1978 – Teddy Lussi-Modeste, French film director, screenwriter and literature teacher
- 1979 – Nate Bargatze, American stand-up comedian and actor
- 1979 – Muriel Hurtis-Houairi, French sprinter
- 1980 – Kathrine Sørland, Norwegian fashion model and television presenter
- 1981 – Casey Neistat, American YouTube personality
- 1982 – Danica Patrick, American race car driver
- 1982 – Álvaro Saborío, Costa Rican footballer
- 1982 – Jenny Slate, American comedian, actress and author
- 1983 – Mickaël Hanany, French high jumper
- 1984 – Katharine McPhee, American singer-songwriter and actress
- 1984 – Liam Messam, New Zealand rugby player
- 1985 – Carmen Rasmusen, Canadian-American singer-songwriter and actress
- 1985 – Diana Rennik, Estonian figure skater
- 1986 – Marco Belinelli, Italian basketball player
- 1986 – Megan Gibson, American softball player
- 1986 – Kyle Lowry, American basketball player
- 1986 – Mickey Paea, Australian rugby league player
- 1987 – Jacob Bagersted, Danish handball player
- 1987 – Victor Obinna, Nigerian footballer
- 1987 – Nobunari Oda, Japanese figure skater
- 1987 – Hyun-jin Ryu, South Korean baseball player
- 1988 – Big Sean, American rapper, singer and songwriter
- 1988 – Ryan Lewis, American music producer
- 1988 – Mitchell Watt, Australian long jumper
- 1988 – Arthur Zeiler, German rugby player
- 1989 – Aly Michalka, American singer-songwriter and guitarist
- 1989 – Scott Sinclair, English footballer
- 1990 – Mehmet Ekici, Turkish footballer
- 1990 – Alexander Esswein, German footballer
- 1991 – Scott Malone, English footballer
- 1992 – Meg Lanning, Australian cricketer
- 1993 – Jacob Gagan, Australian rugby league player
- 1993 – Sam Johnstone, English footballer
- 1994 – Justine Dufour-Lapointe, Canadian skier
- 1994 – Clara Sorrenti, Canadian Twitch streamer and transgender activist
- 1999 – Mikey Madison, American actress
- 2000 – Ozan Kabak, Turkish footballer

== Deaths ==
=== Pre-1600 ===
- 908 – Li Kening, Chinese general
- 940 – Taira no Masakado, Japanese samurai
- 990 – Nicodemus of Mammola, Italian monk and saint
- 1005 – Kenneth III, king of Scotland
- 1051 – Hugh IV, French nobleman
- 1189 – Frederick, duke of Bohemia
- 1223 – Alfonso II, king of Portugal (born 1185)
- 1351 – Kō no Moronao, Japanese samurai
- 1351 – Kō no Moroyasu, Japanese samurai
- 1392 – Hosokawa Yoriyuki, Japanese samurai
- 1458 – Íñigo López de Mendoza, 1st Marquis of Santillana, Spanish poet and politician (born 1398)
- 1558 – Marcos de Niza, French friar and explorer (born 1495)

=== 1601–1900 ===
- 1603 – Ikoma Chikamasa, Japanese daimyō (born 1526)
- 1609 – Olaus Martini, Swedish archbishop (born 1557)
- 1609 – Isabelle de Limeuil, French noble (born 1535)
- 1620 – Johannes Nucius, German composer and theorist (born 1556)
- 1625 – Giambattista Marino, Italian poet and author (born 1569)
- 1658 – Herman IV, Landgrave of Hesse-Rotenburg, German nobleman (born 1607)
- 1677 – Wenceslaus Hollar, Czech-English painter and etcher (born 1607)
- 1701 – Jean Regnault de Segrais, French poet and novelist (born 1624)
- 1712 – Nehemiah Grew, English anatomist and physiologist (born 1641)
- 1732 – Lucy Filippini, Italian teacher and saint (born 1672)
- 1736 – Nicholas Hawksmoor, English architect, designed Easton Neston and Christ Church (born 1661)
- 1738 – Turlough O'Carolan, Irish harp player and composer (born 1670)
- 1801 – Novalis, German poet and author (born 1772)
- 1818 – Caspar Wessel, Norwegian-Danish mathematician and cartographer (born 1745)
- 1848 – Nicolai Wergeland, Norwegian priest, writer and politician (born 1780)
- 1857 – William Colgate, English-American businessman and philanthropist, founded Colgate-Palmolive (born 1783)
- 1860 – James Braid, Scottish surgeon (born 1795)
- 1869 – Edward Bates, American politician and lawyer (born 1793)
- 1873 – Wilhelm Marstrand, Danish painter and illustrator (born 1810)

=== 1901–present ===
- 1907 – Ernst von Bergmann, Latvian-German surgeon and academic (born 1836)
- 1908 – Durham Stevens, American diplomat (born 1851)
- 1914 – Frédéric Mistral, French lexicographer and poet, 1904 Nobel Prize laureate (born 1830)
- 1917 – Elizabeth Storrs Mead, American academic (born 1832)
- 1918 – Claude Debussy, French composer (born 1862)
- 1918 – Peter Martin, Australian footballer and soldier (born 1875)
- 1927 – Marie-Alphonsine Danil Ghattas, Palestinian Roman Catholic nun; later canonized (born 1843)
- 1931 – Ganesh Shankar Vidyarthi, Indian journalist and politician (born 1890)
- 1931 – Ida B. Wells, American journalist and activist (born 1862)
- 1932 – Harriet Backer, Norwegian painter (born 1845)
- 1942 – William Carr, American rower (born 1876)
- 1951 – Eddie Collins, American baseball player and manager (born 1887)
- 1956 – Lou Moore, American race car driver (born 1904)
- 1956 – Robert Newton, English actor (born 1905)
- 1958 – Tom Brown, American trombonist (born 1888)
- 1964 – Charles Benjamin Howard, Canadian businessman and politician (born 1885)
- 1965 – Viola Liuzzo, American civil rights activist (born 1925)
- 1969 – Billy Cotton, English singer, drummer, and bandleader (born 1899)
- 1969 – Max Eastman, American poet and activist (born 1883)
- 1973 – Jakob Sildnik, Estonian photographer and director (born 1883)
- 1973 – Edward Steichen, Luxembourgian-American photographer, painter, and curator (born 1879)
- 1975 – Juan Gaudino, Argentinian race car driver (born 1893)
- 1975 – Faisal of Saudi Arabia, Saudi Arabian king (born 1906)
- 1975 – Deiva Zivarattinam, Indian lawyer and politician (born 1894)
- 1976 – Josef Albers, German-American painter and educator (born 1888)
- 1976 – Benjamin Miessner, American radio engineer and inventor (born 1890)
- 1979 – Robert Madgwick, Australian colonel and academic (born 1905)
- 1979 – Akinoumi Setsuo, Japanese sumo wrestler, the 37th Yokozuna (born 1914)
- 1980 – Milton H. Erickson, American psychiatrist and psychologist (born 1901)
- 1980 – Walter Susskind, Czech-English conductor and educator (born 1913)
- 1982 – Goodman Ace, American comedian and writer (born 1899)
- 1983 – Bob Waterfield, American football player and coach (born 1920)
- 1986 – Gloria Blondell, American actress (born 1910)
- 1987 – A. W. Mailvaganam, Sri Lankan physicist and academic (born 1906)
- 1988 – Robert Joffrey, American dancer, choreographer, and director, co-founded the Joffrey Ballet (born 1930)
- 1991 – Marcel Lefebvre, French-Swiss archbishop (born 1905)
- 1992 – Nancy Walker, American actress, singer, and director (born 1922)
- 1994 – Angelines Fernández, Spanish-Mexican actress (born 1922)
- 1994 – Bernard Kangro, Estonian poet and journalist (born 1910)
- 1994 – Max Petitpierre, Swiss jurist and politician (born 1899)
- 1995 – James Samuel Coleman, American sociologist and academic (born 1926)
- 1995 – John Hugenholtz, Dutch engineer (born 1914)
- 1998 – Max Green, Australian lawyer (born 1952)
- 1998 – Steven Schiff, American lawyer and politician (born 1947)
- 1999 – Cal Ripken, Sr., American baseball player, coach, and manager (born 1936)
- 2000 – Helen Martin, American actress (born 1909)
- 2001 – Brian Trubshaw, English cricketer and pilot (born 1924)
- 2002 – Kenneth Wolstenholme, English journalist and sportscaster (born 1920)
- 2005 – Paul Henning, American screenwriter and producer (born 1911)
- 2006 – Bob Carlos Clarke, Irish photographer (born 1950)
- 2006 – Rocío Dúrcal, Spanish singer and actress (born 1944)
- 2006 – Richard Fleischer, American film director (born 1916)
- 2006 – Buck Owens, American singer-songwriter and guitarist (born 1929)
- 2007 – Andranik Margaryan, Armenian engineer and politician, 10th Prime Minister of Armenia (born 1951)
- 2008 – Ben Carnevale, American basketball player and coach (born 1915)
- 2008 – Thierry Gilardi, French journalist and sportscaster (born 1958)
- 2008 – Abby Mann, American screenwriter and producer (born 1927)
- 2008 – Herb Peterson, American businessman, created the McMuffin (born 1919)
- 2009 – Johnny Blanchard, American baseball player (born 1933)
- 2009 – Kosuke Koyama, Japanese-American theologian and academic (born 1929)
- 2009 – Dan Seals, American musician (born 1948)
- 2009 – Muhsin Yazıcıoğlu, Turkish politician and member of the Parliament of Turkey (born 1954)
- 2012 – Priscilla Buckley, American journalist and author (born 1921)
- 2012 – Hal E. Chester, American actor, director, and producer (born 1921)
- 2012 – John Crosfield, English businessman, founded Crosfield Electronics (born 1915)
- 2012 – Edd Gould, English animator and voice actor, founded Eddsworld (born 1988)
- 2012 – Antonio Tabucchi, Italian author and academic (born 1943)
- 2013 – Léonce Bernard, Canadian politician, 26th Lieutenant Governor of Prince Edward Island (born 1943)
- 2013 – Ben Goldfaden, American basketball player and educator (born 1913)
- 2013 – Anthony Lewis, American journalist and academic (born 1927)
- 2013 – Jean Pickering, English runner and long jumper (born 1929)
- 2013 – Jean-Marc Roberts, French author and screenwriter (born 1954)
- 2013 – John F. Wiley, American lieutenant, football player, and coach (born 1920)
- 2014 – Lorna Arnold, English historian and author (born 1915)
- 2014 – Hank Lauricella, American football player and politician (born 1930)
- 2014 – Jon Lord, Canadian businessman and politician (born 1956)
- 2014 – Sonny Ruberto, American baseball player, coach, and manager (born 1946)
- 2014 – Jonathan Schell, American journalist and author (born 1943)
- 2014 – Ralph Wilson, American businessman, founded the Buffalo Bills (born 1918)
- 2015 – George Fischbeck, American journalist and educator (born 1922)
- 2016 – Shannon Bolin, American actress and singer (born 1917)
- 2017 – Cuthbert Sebastian, St. Kitts and Nevis politician (born 1921)
- 2019 – Barrie Hole, Welsh footballer (born 1942)
- 2020 – Floyd Cardoz, Indian-born American chef (born 1960)
- 2021 – Beverly Cleary, American author (born 1916)
- 2022 – Taylor Hawkins, American drummer and singer (born 1972)
- 2025 – Tapani Kansa, Finnish singer (born 1949)
- 2025 – Terry Manning, American musician and recording engineer (born 1947)
- 2026 – Dash Crofts, American musician (born 1938)
- 2026 – Alexander Kluge, German author, film director and public intellectual (born 1932)

== Holidays and observances ==
- Anniversary of the Arengo and the Feast of the Militants (San Marino)
- Christian feast days:
  - Feast of the Annunciation
  - March 25 (Eastern Orthodox liturgics)
- Christian Saints' days
  - Ælfwold II of Sherborne
  - Blessed Marie-Alphonsine Danil Ghattas
  - Omelyan Kovch (Ukrainian Greek Catholic Church)
  - Dismas, the "Good Thief"
  - Hilary Paweł Januszewski
  - Humbert of Maroilles
  - Josaphata Hordashevska
  - Margaret Clitherow
  - Procopius of Sázava
  - Quirinus of Tegernsee
- Commemoration Day for the Victims of Communist Genocide (Latvia)
- Cultural Workers Day (Russia)
- Empress Menen's Birthday (Rastafari)
- EU Talent Day (European Union)
- Freedom Day (Belarus)
- Independence Day, celebrates the start of Greek War of Independence from the Ottoman Empire, in 1821. (Greece)
- International Day of Remembrance of the Victims of Slavery and the Transatlantic Slave Trade (international)
- International Day of Solidarity with Detained and Missing Staff Members (United Nations General Assembly)
- International Day of the Unborn Child (international)
- Maryland Day (Maryland, United States)
- Medal of Honor Day (United States)
- Mother's Day (Slovenia)
- New Year's Day (Lady Day) in England, Wales, Ireland, and some of the future United States and Canada from 1155 through 1751, until the Calendar (New Style) Act 1750 moved it to 1 January and adopted the Gregorian calendar. (The year 1751 began on 25 March; the year 1752 began on 1 January.)
  - It was also New Years Day in Scotland until (and including) 25 March 1599; 1600 in Scotland began in 1 January – see Calendar (New Style) Act 1750#Scotland.
  - Some other European countries also celebrated 25 March as New Years Day until the late Medieval period – see New Year#Historical European new year dates.
- NZ Army Day
- Quarter day (first of four) in Ireland and England.
- Struggle for Human Rights Day (Slovakia)
- Tolkien Reading Day
- Vårfrudagen or Våffeldagen, "Waffle Day" (Sweden, Norway & Denmark)
