= WSD =

WSD may refer to:

== Education ==
- Wanganui School of Design
- Windham School District (Texas), US
- Wisconsin School for the Deaf, US
- Westminster School District, Orange County, California, US
- Wissahickon School District
- Woodbridge School District
- Winnipeg School Division

== Computing ==
Web Services for Devices, an API that allows to discover and access remote devices (i.e. printers) across a network

== Observances ==
- World Speech Day
- World Statistics Day
- World Storytelling Day
- World Stroke Day

== Other uses ==
- Water Supplies Department, of the government of Hong Kong
- Web Services for Devices, a Microsoft API
- Wideband Single-bit Data, a file format for Direct Stream Digital encoded audio recordings
- Word-sense disambiguation, in natural language processing
