= Junonalia =

Roman festival

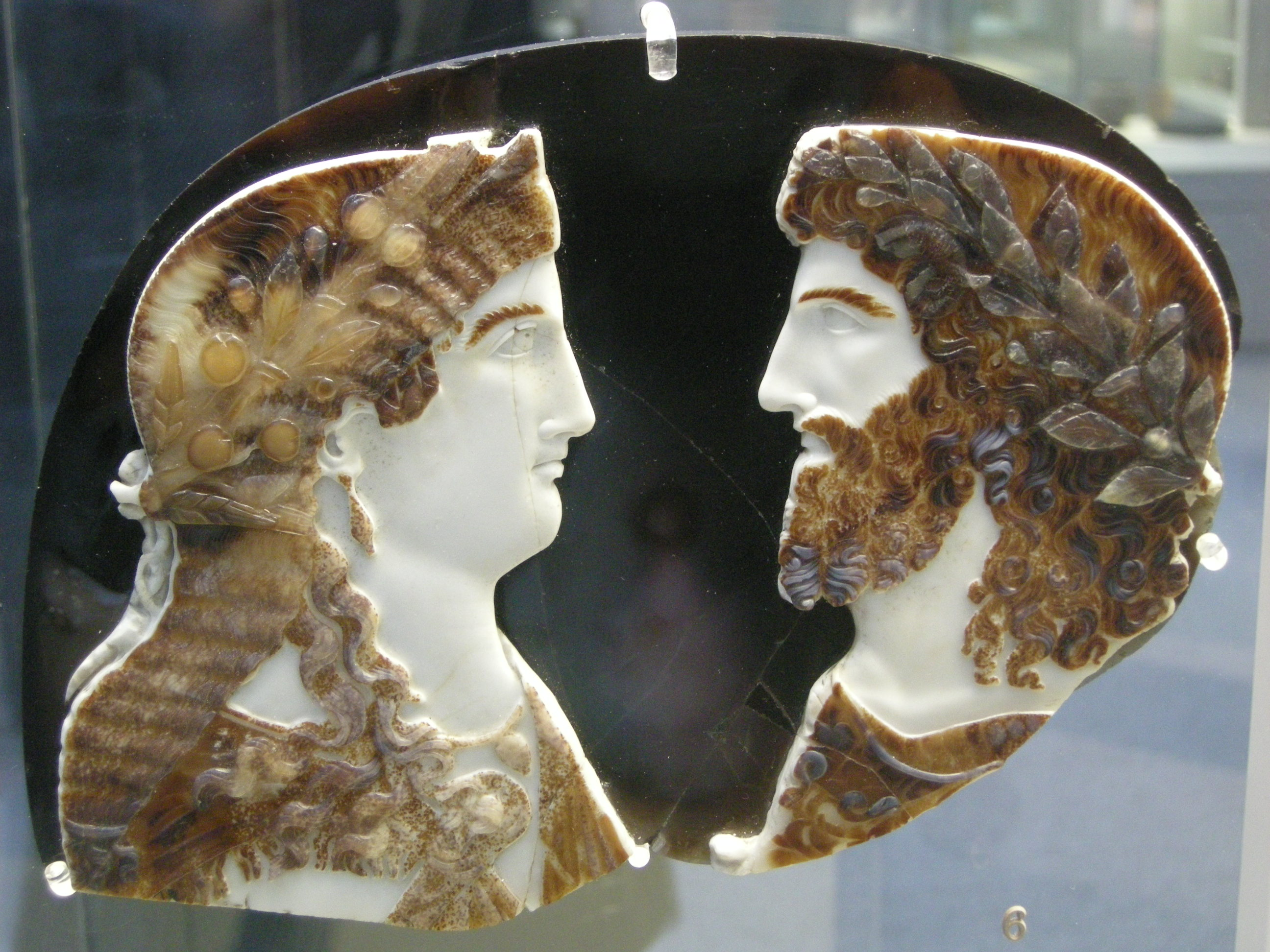
Sardonyx cameo (ca. 37–50) depicting two members of the imperial family as Jupiter Ammon and Juno-Isis

The Iunonalia or Junonalia was a Roman festival in honor of Juno, held on March 7 (the Nones). Among extant Roman calendars, it appears only in the Calendar of Filocalus (354 AD), and was added to the festival calendar after the mid-1st century AD.

The Junonalia is attested also in a fragmentary poem De Iunonalibus, attributed to Claudian. In it, Juno is addressed as mistress of the celestial pole, and the spouse and sister of the king of heaven. Her function as a goddess of marital bonds is also noted. Although the text is conjectural at this point, she may be asked to grant a return.

The Junonalia may have concluded a three-day festival begun March 5 with the Isidis Navigium, the "Sailing of Isis." In the Metamorphoses of Apuleius, Isis is addressed as Queen of Heaven, and by the 2nd century a number of goddesses, including Juno, shared the epithet Caelestis.
