= HIV.gov =

American governmental health website

HIV.gov, formerly known as AIDS.gov, is an internet portal for all United States federal domestic HIV and AIDS resources and information. On World AIDS Day, December 1, 2006, the U.S. Department of Health and Human Services launched AIDS.gov. The site contains content and links that guide users to their desired information.

HIV.gov is intended as a resource for the general public, federal staff/agencies, state staff, federal grantees, medical and research institutions, and other HIV and AIDS-related organizations. It is sponsored by the Department of Health and Human Services’ (HHS) Office of Public Health and Science and Office of the Assistant Secretary for Public Affairs and works across the government.

The content, design and development team includes representatives from HHS and other government agencies working on AIDS domestically. The site is maintained in Washington, D.C.

== Awards ==
On March 11, 2008, AIDS.gov received the American Association of Webmasters Gold Award. This is a peer-reviewed, criteria-based award for achievement in web design in which rigorous standards of HTML code, web design, technical achievement, and overall content are evaluated.

In August 2010, the AIDS.gov blog was selected as a top government blog on Juggle.com.

== History ==
In June 2017 AIDS.gov changed its name to HIV.gov and reorganized its web site so that it combined the previously separate website and blog.

== Media ==
In January, 2008, AIDS.gov started a blog on how to use new media tools in response to HIV/AIDS. The blog has since expanded to cover HIV policy and research, as well as new media. AIDS.gov is also engaged in other new media activities —from maintaining a presence on social media sites such as Twitter and YouTube to promoting a text messaging campaign with the Kaiser Family Foundation and the Centers for Disease Control and Prevention. Mobile phone users can text their ZIP code to KNOWIT (566948) and will receive the location of their nearest HIV testing center.

In recognition of the 20th World AIDS Day on December 1, 2008, AIDS.gov took part in several key new media activities: the Facing AIDS initiative, Bloggers Unite for World AIDS Day, and Second Life World AIDS Day events.

In recognition of World AIDS Day on December 1, 2009, AIDS.gov again hosted the Facing AIDS initiative, among other activities. Facing AIDS encouraged people around the country (and world) to take a photo of themselves saying why they were "Facing AIDS" for World AIDS Day and to upload the photo to the Facing AIDS group on Flickr. Over 850 photos were submitted to the Facing AIDS group, and Flickr featured the initiative on its blog.

For National HIV Testing Day (NHTD) 2009, June 27, AIDS.gov shared testing messages from President Obama, and HHS Secretary Sebelius and DC Mayor Fenty. As part of NHTD 2009, AIDS.gov produced the “I Know. I Took the Test” blog series that highlighted campaigns focused on sharing personal HIV testing stories from organizations such as The Positive Project, Southern AIDS Living Quilt, National Association of People with AIDS, and POZ. In addition, in collaboration with the CDC, AIDS.gov developed and promoted an accompanying widget with videos from the campaigns, and with the President's NHTD message.

For National HIV Testing Day (NHTD) on June 27, 2010, AIDS.gov worked with HUD's Housing Opportunities for Persons with AIDS Program, SAMHSA's Center for Mental Health Services, the Health Resources and Services Administration (HRSA), the CDC, and others to develop the HIV/AIDS Prevention & Service Provider Locator. By entering a location (ZIP code, city and state), an individual can locate nearby prevention, housing, mental health, substance abuse, testing, and treatment services.
