= Waffle Day =

Annual tradition in Sweden, Norway and Denmark

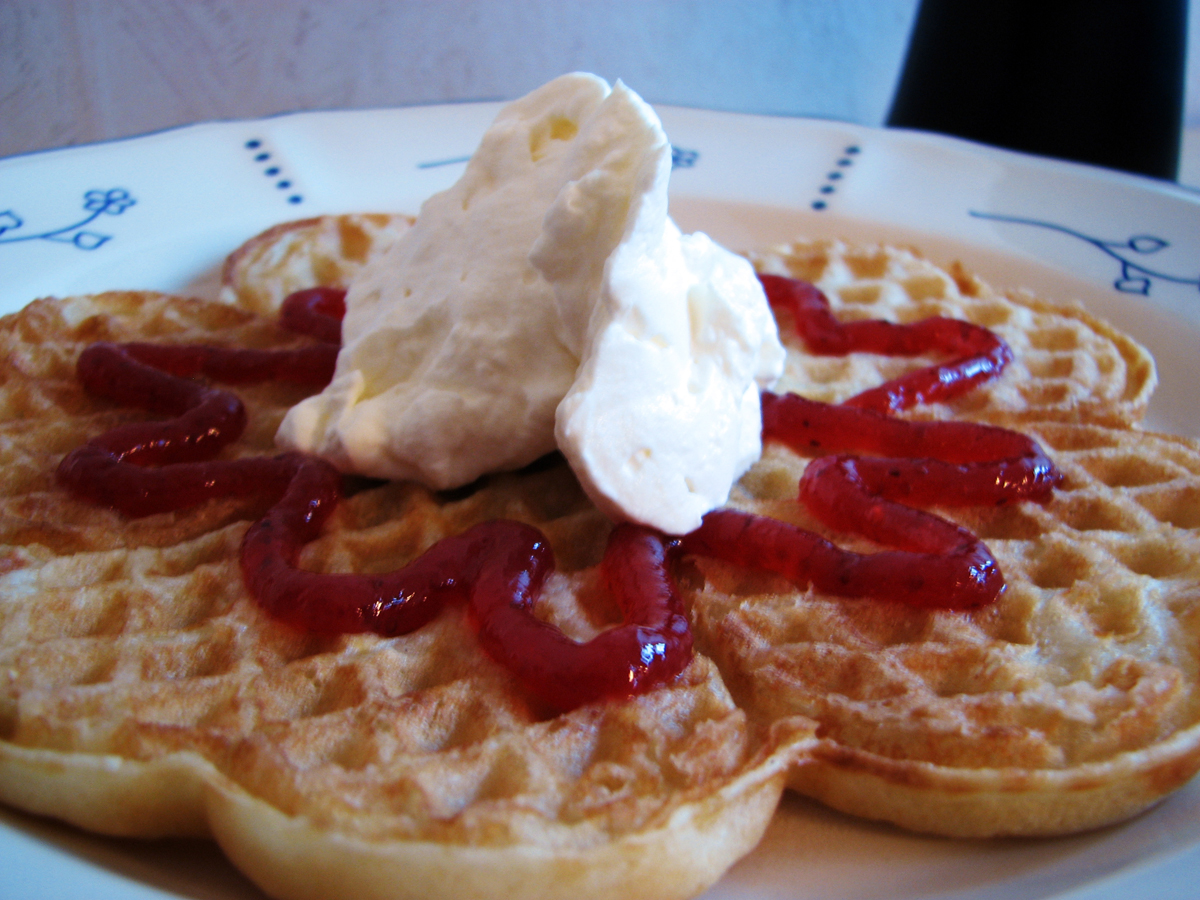
Traditional Swedish heart-shaped waffles with cream and jam.

Waffle Day (Swedish: våffeldagen [ˈvɔ̂fːɛlˌdɑːɡɛn], Norwegian: vaffeldagen, Danish: vaffeldag) is a tradition that is celebrated in Sweden, Norway and Denmark on 25 March, which is also the Feast of the Annunciation, upon which waffles are typically eaten. The shift from the religious celebration to Waffle Day occurred because the Swedish Vårfrudagen, meaning "Our Lady's Day" or "the Day of our Lady" (the Feast of the Annunciation), sounds similar to våffeldagen ("waffle day") in faster speech, and so over time Swedes began calling it Waffle Day and celebrating by eating waffles.

Waffle Day has recently begun to be celebrated in other countries as well, often ushered in by restaurants and cafés specialising in waffles, as in India, where the Belgian Waffle Co. in 2018 declared that they would celebrate National Waffle Day in July, or in Norway, where Waffle Day was all but unknown until producers of waffle irons, milk and flour started to promote waffle day in the mid-2010s. In the United States, National Waffle Day is celebrated in August to commemorate the date of a U.S. patent on a waffle iron; however the celebration is described as "at best a 'bizarre' or 'unique' holiday – the fluff stuff of radio DJ commentary", a frequent criticism of food celebration days. Some people love the occasion and think of it as a real festival whereas others don't really like or understand it.
