= International Astrology Day =

Annual celebration by astrologers

- Date: Northward equinox
- Frequency: annual

International Astrology Day (most often observed on either March 20 or March 21) was first asserted by the Association for Astrological Networking in 1993 and is an annual observance/holiday celebrated by astrologers and astrology enthusiasts. It is seen by astrologers as the beginning (first day) of the astrological year. It is the first full day of the astrological sign of Aries and thus marks the beginning of the tropical Zodiac.

International Astrology Day is celebrated/observed depending on the exact day that the Northward equinox actually occurs. This varies year to year between March 19–22, though it usually falls on March 20 or March 21.

The date of the holiday occurs at the same time of the Iranian new year (Norouz), which is celebrated in many places throughout the Middle East and Central Asia. It also corresponds with the beginning of the Baháʼí calendar, which is celebrated as Baháʼí Naw-Rúz. Other holidays occurring around this time include Ostara (amongst neopagans), Chunfen in China, and Vernal Equinox Day (a public holiday in Japan), among others.

== See also ==
- Astrology
- Astrology and astronomy
- History of astrology
- Spring festivals
- Northward equinox
