= Lady Day =

Feast of the Annunciation, usually 25 March

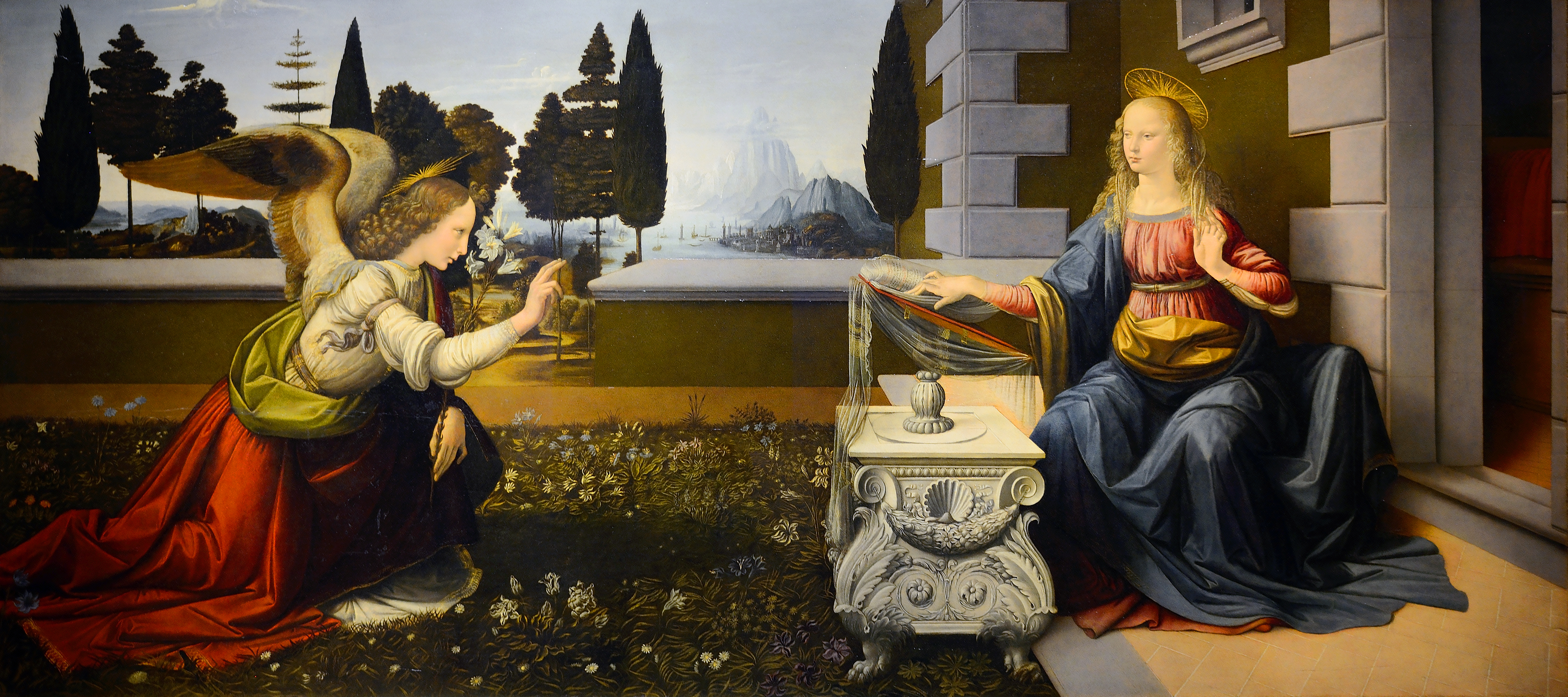
- The Annunciation c. 1472–1476 by Leonardo da Vinci
- Official name: Feast of the Annunciation
- Observed by: Anglophone and Scandinavian Christians internationally
- Type: Religious, with later secular effects
- Date: 25 March
- Frequency: Annual
- Related to: Christmas, March equinox

In the Western liturgical year, Lady Day is the common name in some English-speaking countries of the Feast of the Annunciation, celebrated on 25 March to commemorate the annunciation of the archangel Gabriel to the Virgin Mary that she would bear Jesus Christ, the Son of God.

== Religious significance ==
The commemorated event is known in the 1549 prayer book of Edward VI and the 1662 Book of Common Prayer as "The Annunciation of the (Blessed) Virgin Mary" but more accurately (as in the modern Calendar of the Church of England) termed "The Annunciation of our Lord to the Blessed Virgin Mary". It is the first of the four traditional English quarter days. The "(Our) Lady" is the Virgin Mary. The term derives from Middle English, when some nouns lost their genitive inflections. "Lady" would later gain an -s genitive ending, and therefore the name means "(Our) Lady's day". The day commemorates the tradition of archangel Gabriel's announcement to Mary that she would give birth to the Christ.

It is celebrated on 25 March each year. In the Catholic Church's Latin liturgical rites, when 25 March falls during Holy Week or Easter week, it is transferred forward to the first suitable day during Eastertide. In Eastern Orthodoxy and Eastern Catholicism, it is never transferred, even if it falls on Pascha (Easter). The concurrence of these two feasts is called kyriopascha.

The Feast of the Annunciation is observed in several branches of Christianity, especially within Orthodoxy, Anglicanism, Catholicism, and Lutheranism. It is a major Marian feast, classified as a solemnity in the Catholic Church, a Festival in the Lutheran churches, and a Principal Feast in the Anglican Communion. In Orthodox Christianity, because it announces the incarnation of Christ, it is counted as one of the 8 great feasts of the Lord, and not among the four great Marian feasts, although some prominent aspects of its liturgical observance are Marian. Two examples in liturgical Christianity of the importance attached to the Annunciation are the Angelus prayer and, especially in Roman Catholicism, the event's position as the first Joyful Mystery of the Dominican Rosary.

== Secular significance ==
In England, Lady Day was New Year's Day (i.e., the new year began on 25 March) from 1155 until 1752, when the Gregorian calendar was adopted in Great Britain and its Empire and with it the first of January as the official start of the year in England, Wales and Ireland. (Scotland changed its new year's day to 1 January in 1600, but retained the Julian calendar until 1752.) A vestige of this remains in the United Kingdom's tax year, which ends on 5 April, or "Old Lady Day" (i.e., Lady Day adjusted for the eleven "lost days" of the calendar change in 1752). Until this change Lady Day had been used as the start of the legal year but also the end of the fiscal and tax year. This should be distinguished from the liturgical and historical year.

As a year-end and quarter-day that conveniently did not fall within or between the seasons for ploughing and harvesting, Lady Day was a traditional day on which year-long contracts between landowners and tenant farmers would begin and end in England and nearby lands (although there were regional variations). Farmers' time of "entry" into new farms and onto new fields was often this day. As a result, farming families who were changing farms would travel from the old farm to the new one on Lady Day. In 1752, the British empire finally followed most of western Europe in switching to the Gregorian calendar from the Julian calendar. The Julian lagged 11 days behind the Gregorian, and hence 25 March in the Old Style calendar became 5 April ("Old Lady Day"), which assumed the role of contractual year-beginning. (The date is significant in some of the works of Thomas Hardy, such as Tess of the d'Urbervilles and Far from the Madding Crowd, and is discussed in his 1884 essay "The Dorset Farm Labourer".)

== See also ==
- International Women's Day – Day to promote women's rights worldwide
- Mother's Day – Celebration honouring mothers
- Mothering Sunday – Christian celebration during Lent
- National Women's Day – Public holiday in South Africa
- Quarter days – Four dates in each year, one of which is (or was) Lady Day
