= EU Talent Day =

Event organised by the European Union

EU Talent Day is an observance of the European Union on Béla Bartók's birthday who was a well-known composer in and outside of Europe.

== History ==
The first European TalentDay was held on April 9, 2011. This coincided with the Hungarian EU Presidential Conference on Talent Support, held in Budapest on April 7–9, 2011. Conference delegates proposed March 25, birthday of Béla Bartók, as EU TalentDay. This event, written on the first EU TalentDay, includes the following points about the purpose of talent development in the European Union and of EU TalentDay:

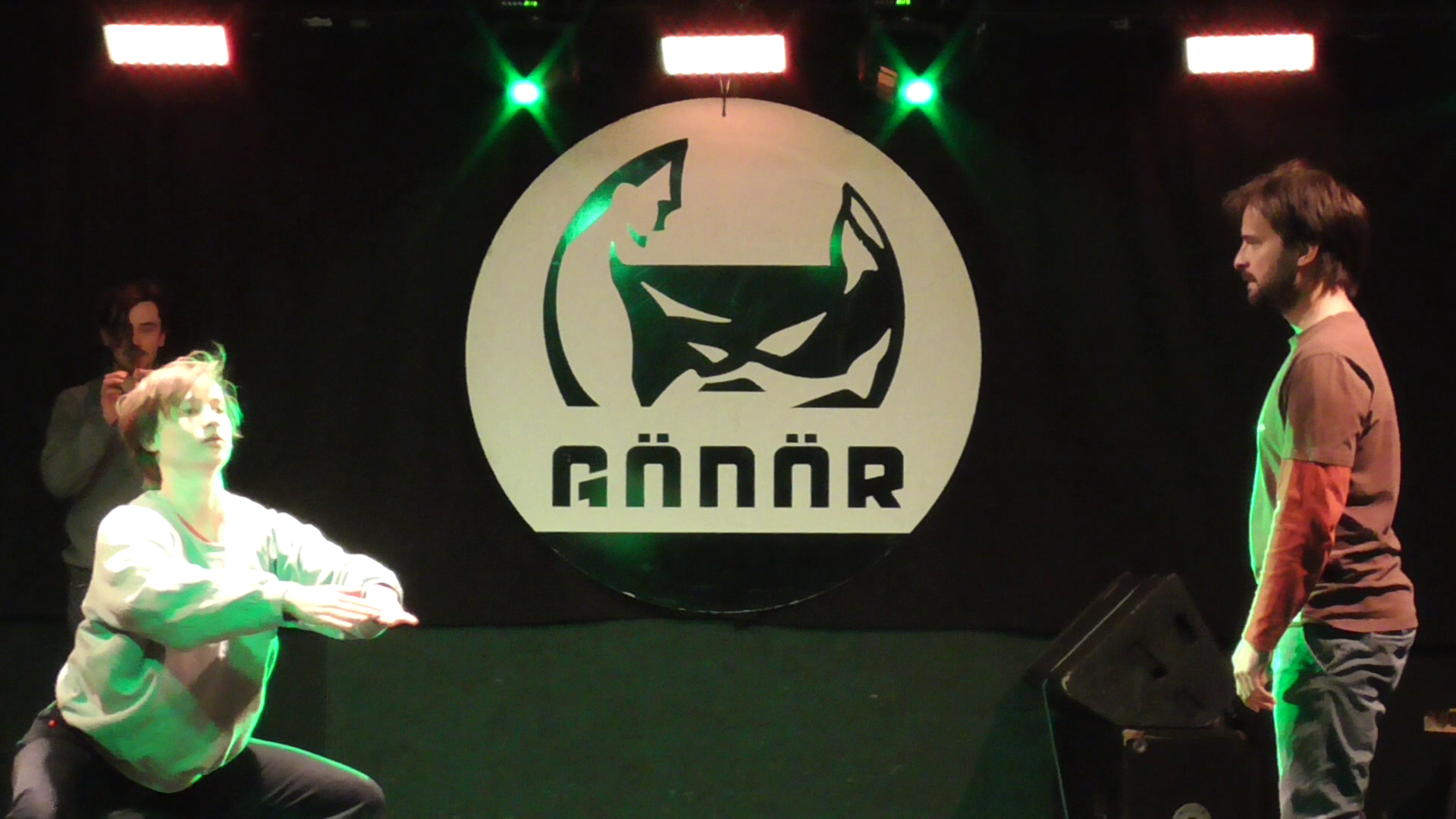
EU Talent Day 1st Libre art Festival, 25, March, 2018, Budapest/G3 Center - LEVEGRU Company - Grégory Chevalier, Viola Lévai, Ernő Rubik

- Talent development has beneficial effects on the economies of individual nations, and of the European Union as a whole.
- Talent support programmes may boost the self-esteem and social success of talented people.
- Talent support is becoming important in the social-economic progress of underprivileged people groups.
- Effective networking of groups facilitating talent development, as is now happening in Hungary, will be even more beneficial once extended across Europe.
- EU TalentDay can help to focus the attention of stakeholders and the European general public, and seeks recognition of talents support benefits and of best practices by the European Commission, the European Council and the European Parliament.

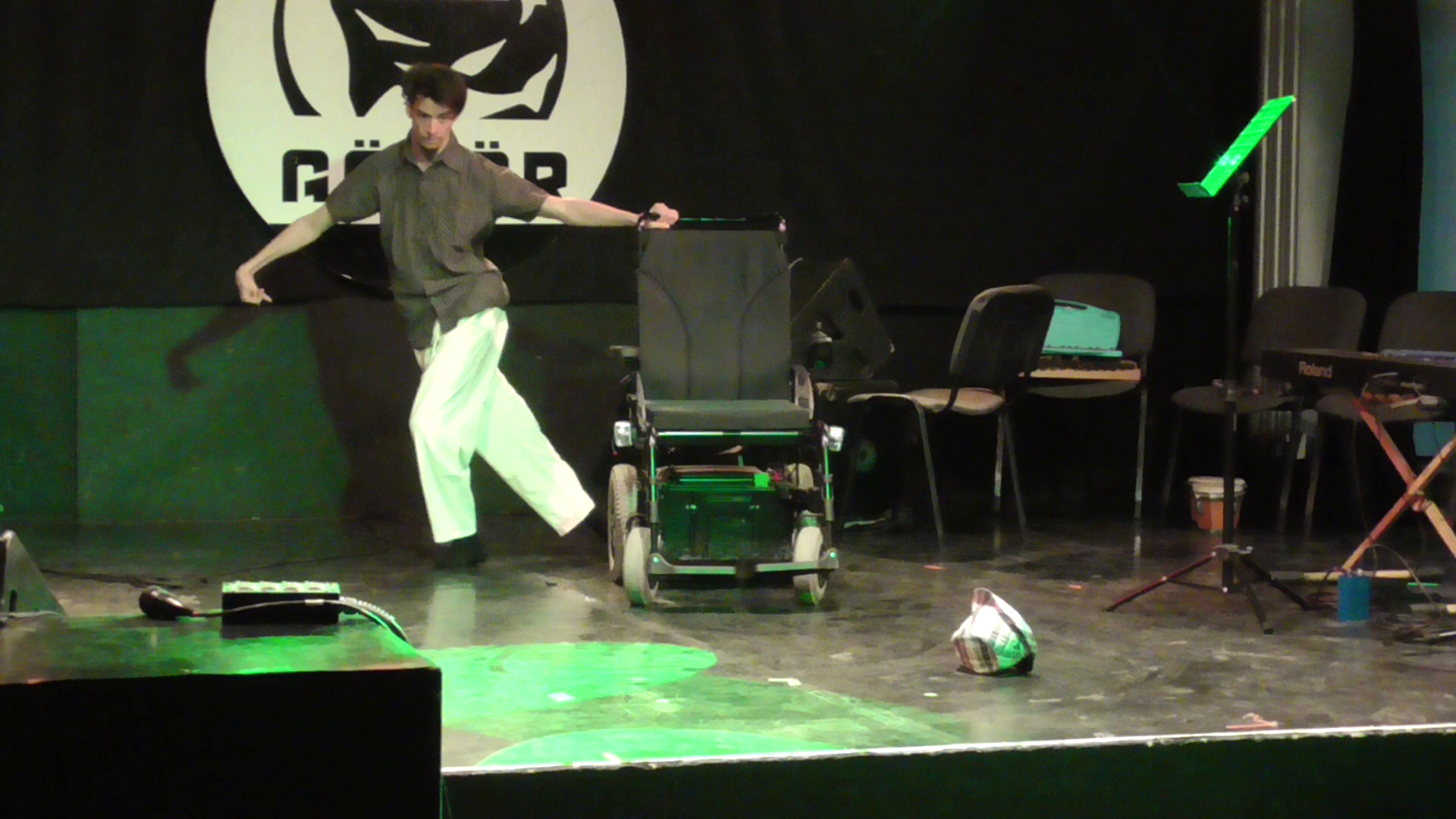
EU Talent Day 1st Libre art Festival, 25, March, 2018, Budapest/G3 Center - Károly Tóth - Way of Possibilities

It is observed on March 25.

== Libre art Festival ==
The first EU Talent Day Libre art Festival was held in March, 2018 in Budapest organized by Attila Szervác: libre art composer, LEVEGRU Company, 4'34" Camerata and other groups.

== Sources ==
- EU Talent Day 2011 - Peter Lydon
- European Talent Day - kuriose-feiertage.de
