= World Storytelling Day =

Annual holiday observed on March 20

- World Storytelling Day logo by Mats Rehnman
- Date: 20 March

World Storytelling Day is a global celebration of the art of oral storytelling. It is celebrated every year on the March equinox, on (or near) March 20. On World Storytelling Day, as many people as possible tell and listen to stories in as many languages and at as many places as possible, during the same day and night. Participants tell each other about their events in order to share stories and inspiration, to learn from each other and create international contacts.

The significance in the event lies in the fact that it is the first global celebration of storytelling of its kind, and has been important in forging links between storytellers often working far apart from each other. It has also been significant in drawing public and media attention to storytelling as an art form.

== Event history ==
World Storytelling Day has its roots in a national day for storytelling in Sweden, circa 1991–92. At that time, an event was organized for March 20 in Sweden called "Alla berättares dag" (All storytellers day). The Swedish national storytelling network passed out some time after, but the day stayed alive, celebrated around the country by different enthusiasts. In 1997, storytellers in Perth, Western Australia coordinated a five-week-long Celebration of Story, commemorating March 20 as the International Day of Oral Narrators. At the same time, in Mexico and other Latin American countries, March 20 was already celebrated as the National Day of Storytellers.

When the Scandinavian storytelling web-network, Ratatosk, started around 2001, Scandinavian storytellers started talking, and in 2002, the event spread from Sweden to Norway, Denmark, Finland and Estonia. In 2003, the idea spread to Canada and other countries, and the event has become known internationally as World Storytelling Day. Starting around 2004, France participated with the event Jour Mondial du Conte. World Storytelling Day 2005 had a grande finale on Sunday March 20. There were events from 25 countries on 5 continents, and 2006 saw the program grow further. 2007 was the first time a storytelling concert was held in Newfoundland, Canada. In 2008, The Netherlands took part in World Storytelling Day with a big event called 'Vertellers in de Aanval' on March 20; three thousand kids were surprised by the sudden appearance of storytellers in their classrooms.

In 2009, there were World Storytelling Day events in Europe, Asia, Africa, North America, South America and Australia.

== Themes ==
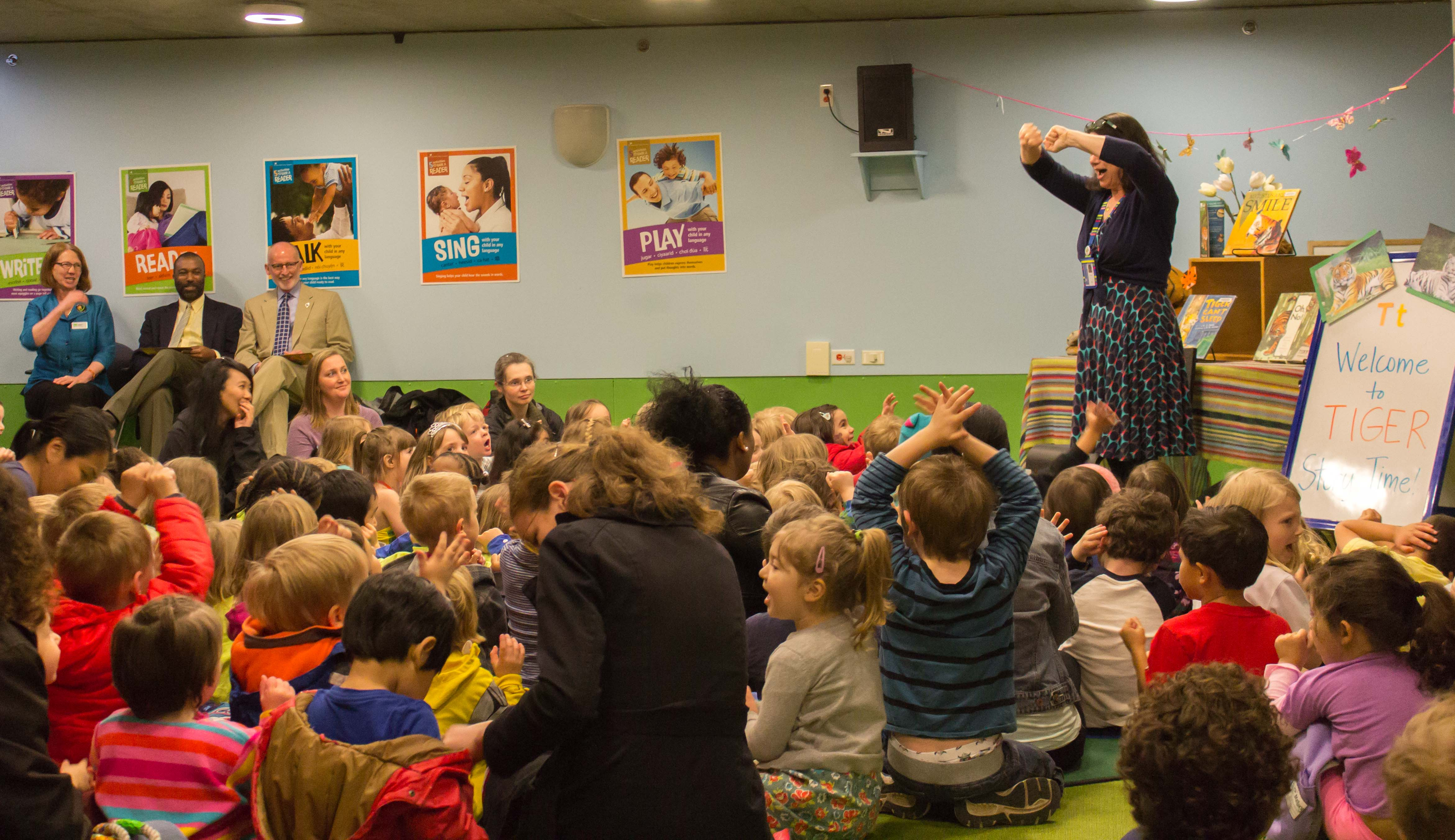

Each year, many of the individual storytelling events that take place around the globe are linked by a common theme. Each year, the theme is identified by and agreed upon by storytellers from around the world using the WSD listserve and Facebook group.

- 2004 - Birds
- 2005 - Bridges
- 2006 - The Moon
- 2007 - The Wanderer
- 2008 - Dreams
- 2009 - Neighbours
- 2010 - Light and Shadow
- 2011 - Water
- 2012 - Trees
- 2013 - Fortune and Fate
- 2014 - Monsters and Dragons
- 2015 - Wishes
- 2016 - Strong Women
- 2017 - Transformation
- 2018 - Wise Fools
- 2019 - Myths, Legends, and Epics
- 2020 - Voyages
- 2021 - New Beginnings
- 2022 - Lost and Found
- 2023 - Together We Can
- 2024 - Building Bridges
- 2025 - Deep Water
- 2026 - Light In The Dark

== See also ==
- Storytelling
- Storytelling festival
- World Book Day
- International Children's Book Day
- Kamishibai
