= International Day of Solidarity with Detained and Missing Staff Members =

The International Day of Solidarity with Detained and Missing Staff Members is observed annually on 25 March by the United Nations.

It commemorates the anniversary of the abduction of Alec Collett, a former journalist who was working for the United Nations Relief and Works Agency for Palestine Refugees (UNRWA) when he was kidnapped by gunmen in 1985. His body was finally found in the Bekaa Valley, Lebanon, in 2009.
