= March equinox =

When sun appears directly over equator

Illumination of Earth by the Sun on the day of an equinox

UT date and time of equinoxes and solstices on Earth
event	equinox		solstice		equinox		solstice	
month	March		June		September		December	
year	day	time	day	time	day	time	day	time
2016	20	04:31	20	22:35	22	14:21	21	10:45
2017	20	10:29	21	04:25	22	20:02	21	16:29
2018	20	16:15	21	10:07	23	01:54	21	22:22
2019	20	21:58	21	15:54	23	07:50	22	04:19
2020	20	03:50	20	21:43	22	13:31	21	10:03
2021	20	09:37	21	03:32	22	19:21	21	15:59
2022	20	15:33	21	09:14	23	01:04	21	21:48
2023	20	21:25	21	14:58	23	06:50	22	03:28
2024	20	03:07	20	20:51	22	12:44	21	09:20
2025	20	09:01	21	02:42	22	18:19	21	15:03
2026	20	14:46	21	08:25	23	00:06	21	20:50
2027	20	20:25	21	14:11	23	06:02	22	02:43
2028	20	02:17	20	20:02	22	11:45	21	08:20
2029	20	08:01	21	01:48	22	17:37	21	14:14
2030	20	13:51	21	07:31	22	23:27	21	20:09
2031	20	19:41	21	13:17	23	05:15	22	01:56
2032	20	01:23	20	19:09	22	11:11	21	07:57
2033	20	07:23	21	01:01	22	16:52	21	13:45
2034	20	13:18	21	06:45	22	22:41	21	19:35
2035	20	19:03	21	12:33	23	04:39	22	01:31
2036	20	01:02	20	18:31	22	10:23	21	07:12

The March equinox or northward equinox is the equinox on the Earth when the subsolar point appears to leave the Southern Hemisphere and cross the celestial equator, heading northward as seen from Earth. The March equinox is known as the vernal equinox (or spring equinox) in the Northern Hemisphere and as the autumnal equinox in the Southern Hemisphere.

On the Gregorian calendar at 0° longitude, the northward equinox usually occurs on March 20. However, it can occur as early as March 19 (which happened most recently in 1796, and will happen next in 2044), and it can occur as late as March 21 (which happened most recently in 2007, and will happen next in 2102). For a common year the computed time slippage is about 5 hours 49 minutes later than the previous year, and for a leap year about 18 hours 11 minutes earlier than the previous year. Balancing the increases of the common years against the losses of the leap years keeps the calendar date of the March equinox from drifting more than one day from March 20 each year.

The March equinox may be taken to mark the beginning of astronomical spring and the end of astronomical winter in the Northern Hemisphere but marks the beginning of astronomical autumn and the end of astronomical summer in the Southern Hemisphere.

In astronomy, the March equinox is the zero point of sidereal time and, consequently, the right ascension and ecliptic longitude. It also serves as a reference for calendars and celebrations in many cultures and religions.

== Constellation ==
The point where the Sun crosses the celestial equator northwards is called the First Point of Aries. However, due to the precession of the equinoxes, this point is no longer in the constellation Aries, but rather in Pisces. By the year 2600 it will be in Aquarius. The Earth's axis causes the First Point of Aries to travel westwards across the sky at a rate of roughly one degree every 72 years. Based on the modern constellation boundaries, the northward equinox passed from Taurus into Aries in the year −1865 (1866 BC), passed into Pisces in the year −67 (68 BC), will pass into Aquarius in the year 2597, and will pass into Capricornus in the year 4312. It passed by (but not into) a 'corner' of Cetus at 0°10′ distance in the year 1489.

== Apparent movement of the Sun ==
In its apparent motion on the day of an equinox, the Sun's disk crosses the Earth's horizon directly to the east at sunrise; and again, some 12 hours later, directly to the west at sunset. The March equinox, like all equinoxes, is characterized by having an almost exactly equal amount of daylight and night across most latitudes on Earth.

== Culture ==
=== Calendars ===
The ancient Babylonian calendar began around the spring equinox, in the month of Nissānu, at which time they recited their creation myth, the Enūma Eliš. Due to Babylonian influence, the beginning of the religious year in the Hebrew calendar shifted to the spring equinox, with Nisan being the first month.

The Persian calendar begins each year at the spring equinox, observationally determined at Tehran.

The Indian national calendar starts the year on the day after the spring equinox on March 22 (March 21 during leap years) with a 30-day month (31 days in leap years), then has 5 months of 31 days followed by 6 months of 30 days.

In the Julian calendar used in the ancient Roman world, the date of the spring equinox was 25 March, and Marcus Terentius Varro wrote in the 1st century BC that the Romans saw this as the middle of spring.

The Julian calendar had a flaw in that the solstices and equinoxes gradually fell on earlier dates. At the First Council of Nicaea (325), the Christian Church set the date of the spring equinox to 21 March on the Julian calendar, for the purpose of calculating Easter. However, the effect continued to accumulate, and by the 16th century, the spring equinox fell on March 10 or 11 in the Julian calendar. It was for this reason that the Gregorian calendar reform was introduced in 1582, to reinstate the date to about 21 March and to minimise any further drifting.

=== Commemorations ===
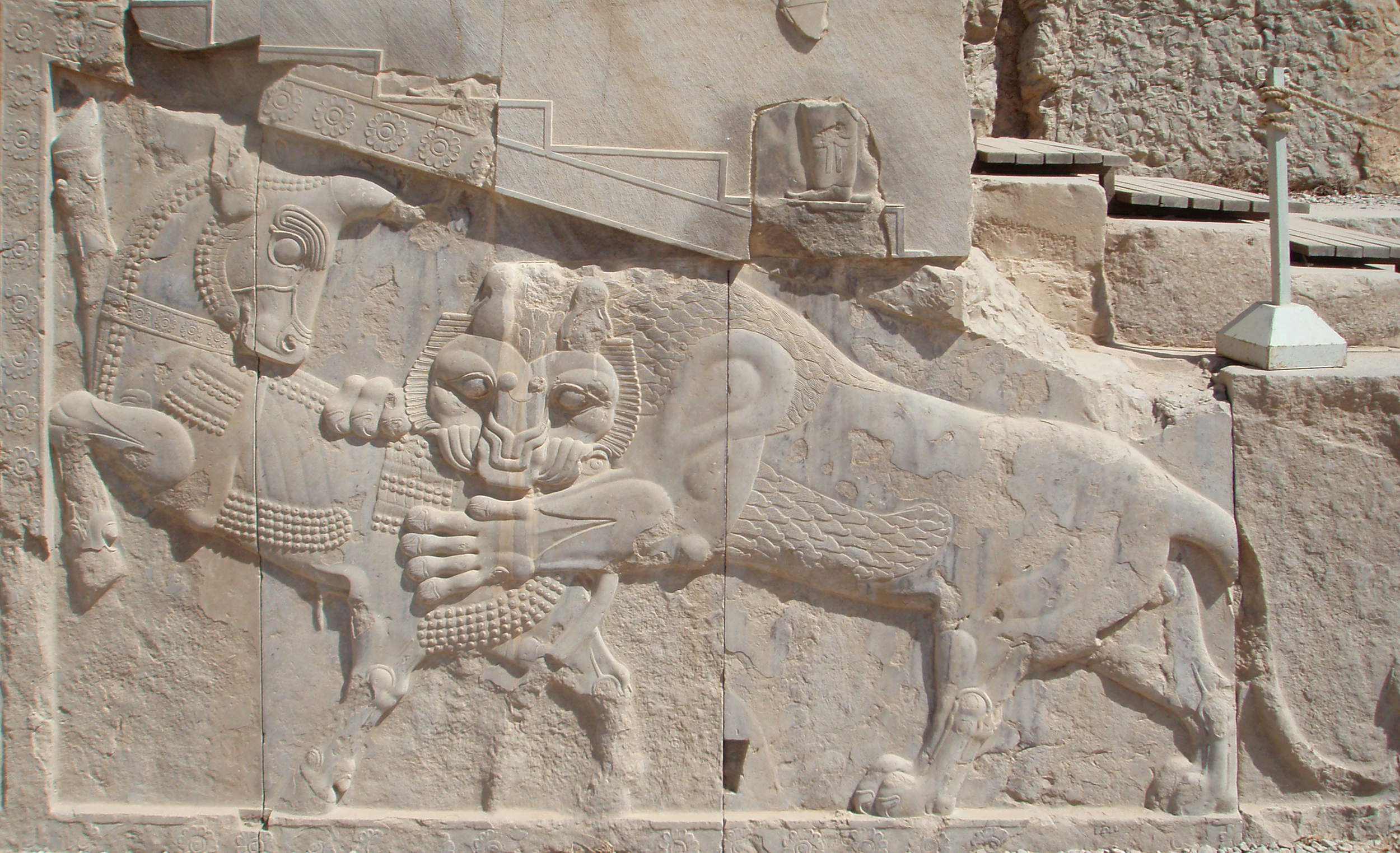
Bas-relief in Persepolis, a symbol of Iranian Nowruz: a bull (symbolizing the Earth) and lion (the Sun) in eternal combat are equal in power on the equinox.

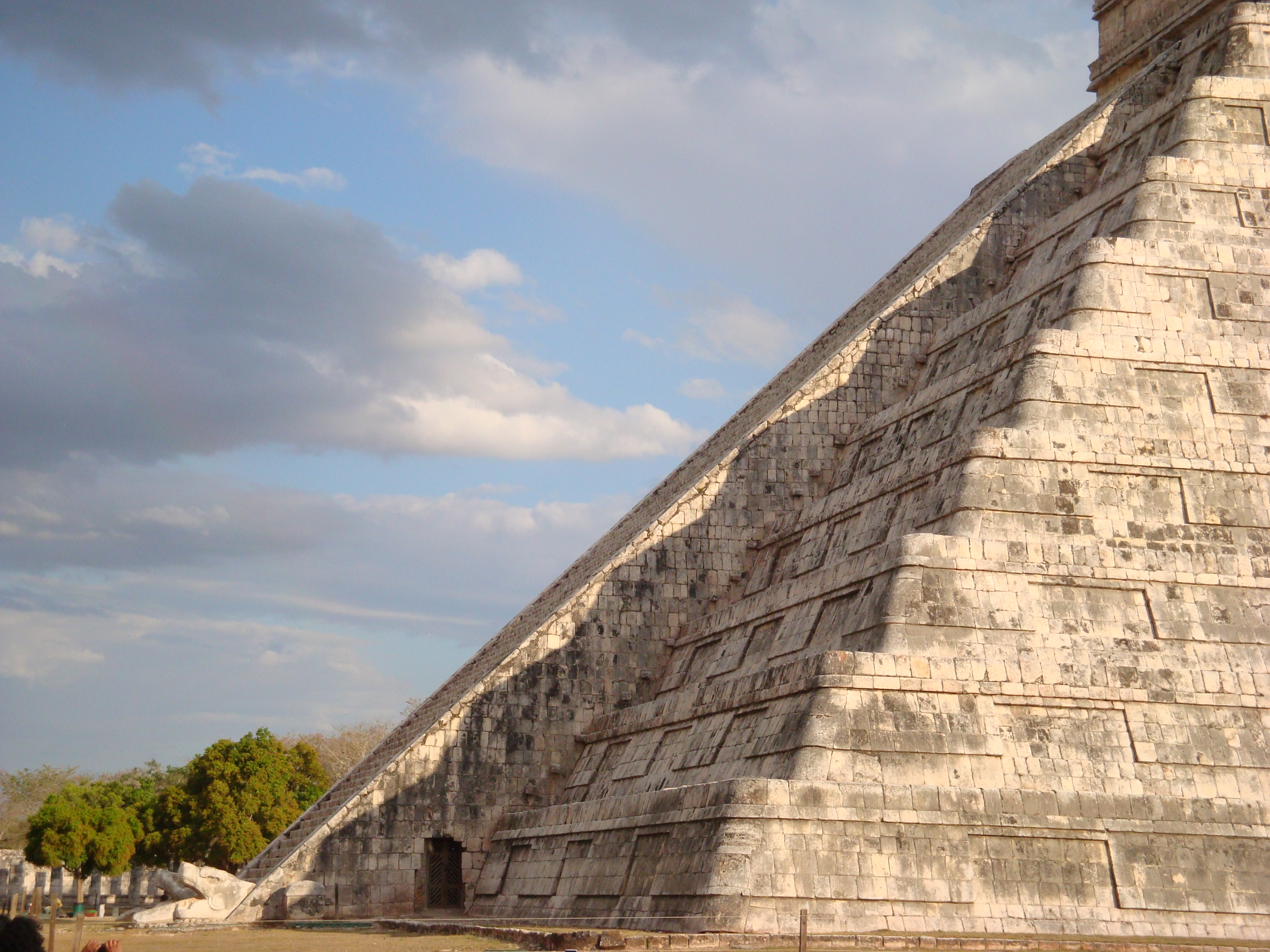
Chichen Itza during the spring equinox—Kukulkan, the famous descent of the snake

==== Abrahamic tradition ====
- The Jewish Passover usually falls on the first full moon after the Northern Hemisphere vernal equinox, although occasionally (due to accumulated error strictly following the Meton approximation, currently three times every 19 years) it will occur on the second full moon.
- The Christian Churches calculate Easter as the first Sunday after the first full moon on or after the March equinox. The official church definition for the equinox is March 21. The Eastern Orthodox Churches use the older Julian calendar, while the western churches use the Gregorian calendar, and the western full moons currently fall four, five or 34 days before the eastern ones. The result is that the two Easters generally fall on different days but they sometimes coincide. The earliest possible western Easter date in any year is March 22 on each calendar. The latest possible western Easter date in any year is April 25.
- In AD 221, Sextus Julius Africanus suggested the spring equinox, 25 March in the Roman calendar, as the first day of creation and of Jesus's conception. The Church later came to celebrate this as the Feast of the Annunciation. As day and night are equal on the equinox, this was linked to the separation of light and dark in the Genesis creation story.

==== Iranian tradition ====
- The northward equinox marks the first day of various calendars including the Iranian calendar. The ancient Iranian peoples' new year's festival of Nowruz can be celebrated March 20 or March 21. According to the ancient Persian mythology Jamshid, the mythological king of Persia, ascended to the throne on this day and each year this is commemorated with festivities for two weeks. Along with Iranian peoples, it is also a holiday celebrated by Turkic people, the North Caucasus and in Albania. It is also a holiday for Zoroastrians, adherents of the Baháʼí Faith and Nizari Ismaili Muslims irrespective of ethnicity.

==== West Asia and North Africa ====
- In many Arab countries, Mother's Day is celebrated on the northward equinox.
- Sham el-Nessim is a modern celebration which is claimed by some to have been celebrated in ancient Egypt but with little evidence. It is one of the public holidays in Egypt. It is assumed by some that sometime during Egypt's Christian period (c. 200–639) the date moved to Easter Monday, but before then it coincided with the vernal equinox.

==== South and Southeast Asia ====
According to the sidereal solar calendar, celebrations which originally coincided with the March equinox now take place throughout South Asia and parts of Southeast Asia on the day when the Sun enters the sidereal Aries, generally around April 14.

- In Cambodia, the Angkor Wat Equinox is a solar phenomenon which dates back to the reign of Suryavarman II.

==== East Asia ====
- The traditional East Asian calendars divide a year into 24 solar terms (节气, literally "climatic segments"), and the vernal equinox (Chūnfēn, Chinese and Japanese: 春分; Korean: 춘분; Vietnamese: Xuân phân) marks the middle of the spring. In this context, the Chinese character 分 means "(equal) division" (within a season).
- In Japan, Vernal Equinox Day (春分の日 Shunbun no hi) is an official national holiday, and is spent visiting family graves and holding family reunions. Higan (お彼岸) is a Buddhist holiday exclusively celebrated by Japanese sects during both the Spring and Autumnal Equinox.

==== Europe ====
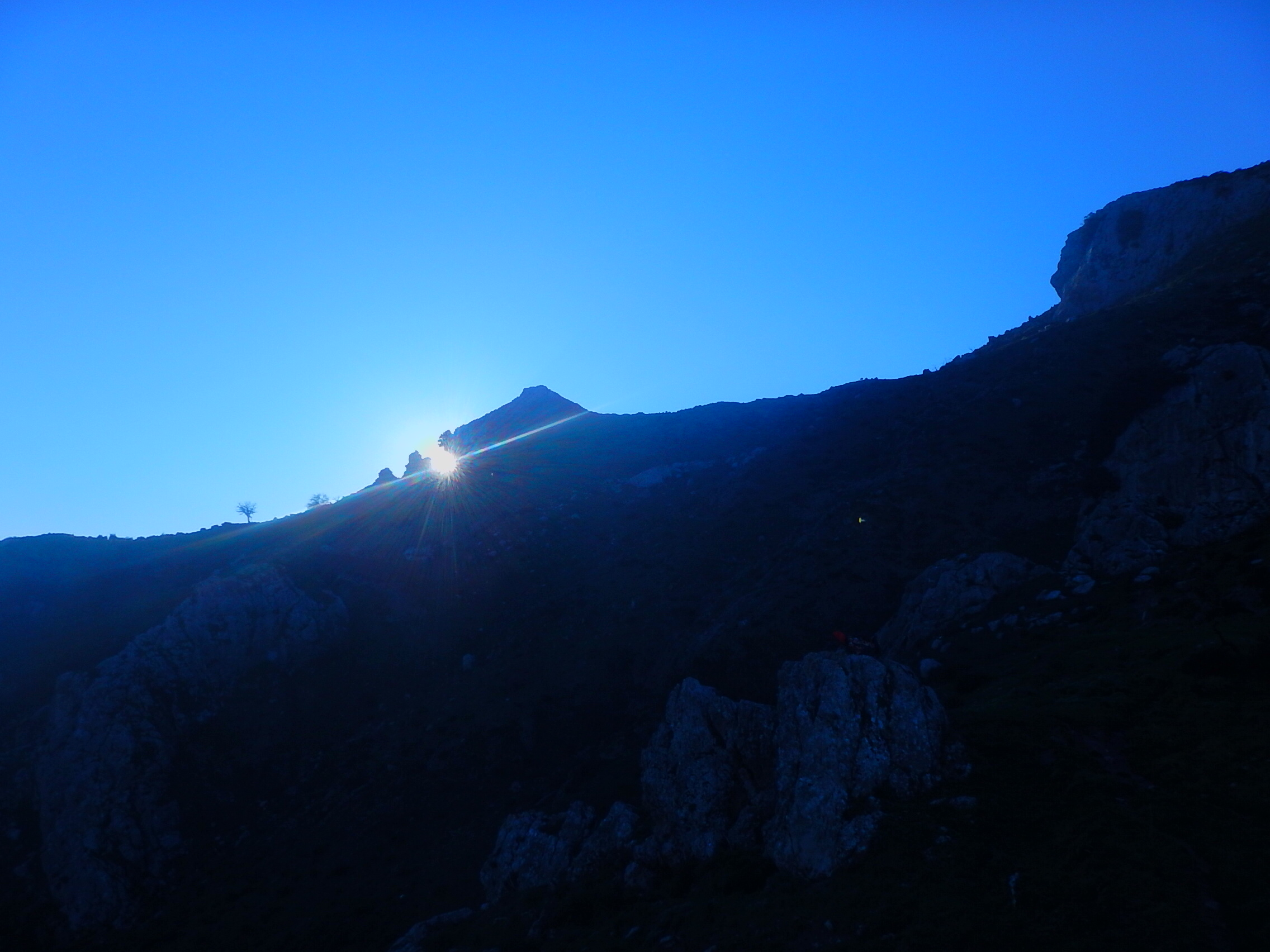
Equinox at the site of Pizzo Vento, Fondachelli Fantina, Sicily

- Dita e Verës or Verëza is the Albanian pagan feast that celebrates the spring equinox: the beginning of the spring-summer period. It is traditionally celebrated throughout Albanian inhabited territories, also officially in Albania.
- Hilaria was an ancient Roman festival commemorating the death and resurrection of Attis.
- Lieldienas
- in Norse paganism, a Dísablót was celebrated on the vernal equinox.
- Drowning of Marzanna

==== The Americas ====
- Spring equinox in Teotihuacán
- The reconstructed Cahokia Woodhenge, a large timber circle located at the Mississippian culture Cahokia archaeological site near Collinsville, Illinois, is the site of annual equinox and solstice sunrise observances. Out of respect for Native American beliefs these events do not feature ceremonies or rituals of any kind.

==== Modern culture ====
- World Storytelling Day is a global celebration of the art of oral storytelling, celebrated every year on the day of the northward equinox.
- World Citizen Day occurs on the northward equinox.
- The Baháʼí calendar year starts at the sunset preceding the March equinox calculated for Tehran.
- In Annapolis, Maryland, United States, boatyard employees and sailboat owners celebrate the spring equinox with the "Burning of the Socks" festival. Traditionally, the boating community wears socks only during the winter. These are burned at the approach of warmer weather, which brings more customers and work to the area. Officially, nobody then wears socks until the next equinox.
- Neopagans observe the March equinox (referred to as Ostara) as a cardinal point on the Wheel of the Year. In the northern hemisphere some varieties of paganism adapt vernal equinox celebrations, while in the southern hemisphere pagans adapt autumnal traditions.
- International Astrology Day
- On March 20, 2014 and March 20, 2018 the March equinox was commemorated by an animated Google Doodle.

== Gallery ==
Satellite image of the Earth during March equinox as seen from Meteosat -12 in 2025 during the March equinox

== See also ==
- June solstice
- September equinox
- December solstice
