= International Day of the Unborn Child =

Annual commemoration of unborn fetuses

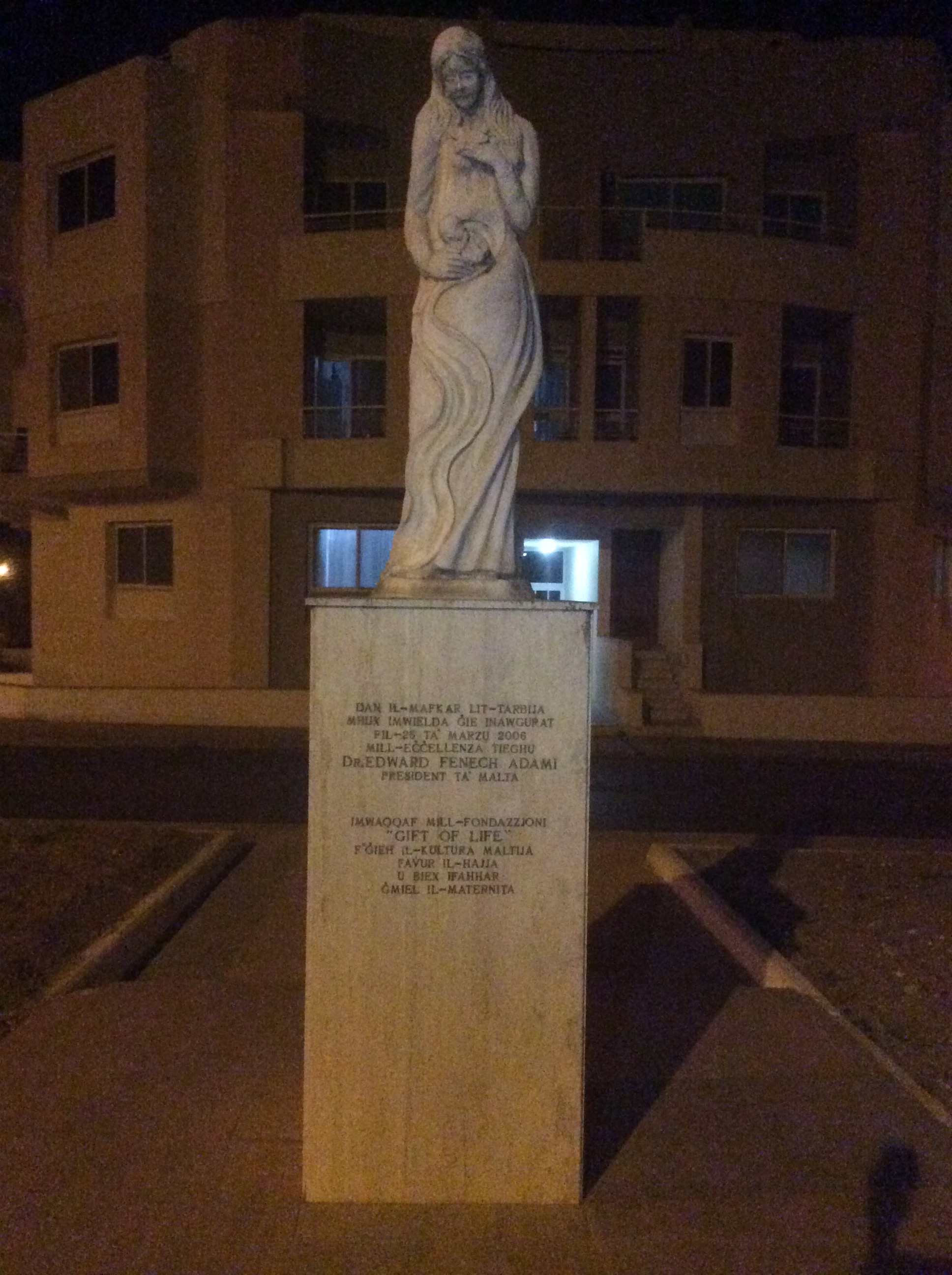

The International Day of the Unborn Child or the Day for Life is an annual commemoration of unborn children, observed as a day of opposition to abortion, on March 25. It was established by Pope John Paul II to coincide with the Feast of the Annunciation. John Paul II viewed the day as "a positive option in favour of life and the spread of a culture for life to guarantee respect for human dignity in every situation".

== History ==
In 1993, El Salvador became the first nation to officially celebrate what was called a Day of the Right to Be Born.

John Paul II in his encyclical Evangelium vitae (published on 25 March 1995) wrote:

In view of this and following the suggestion made by the Cardinals in the Consistory of 1991, I propose that a Day for Life be celebrated each year in every country, as already established by some Episcopal Conferences. The celebration of this Day should be planned and carried out with the active participation of all sectors of the local Church. Its primary purpose should be to foster in individual consciences, in families, in the Church and in civil society a recognition of the meaning and value of human life at every stage and in every condition. Particular attention should be drawn to the seriousness of abortion and euthanasia, without neglecting other aspects of life which from time to time deserve to be given careful consideration, as occasion and circumstances demand.

Subsequently other countries initiated official celebrations for the unborn, for example in 1998 the Day of the Unborn in Argentina and the Life Sanctity Day in Poland, in 1999 the Day of the Conceived and Unborn in Chile, the National Day of the Unborn in Guatemala, and the National Day of Life Before Birth in Costa Rica. Nicaragua began observing the Day of the Unborn Child in 2000, the Dominican Republic in 2001, Peru in 2002, Paraguay in 2003, the Philippines in 2004, Honduras in 2005, Ecuador in 2006, and Puerto Rico in 2018. In Chile the Chamber of Deputies officially approved the Day of the Unborn Child and Adoption in 2013.
