= World Speech Day =

World Speech Day takes place annually on 15 March, celebrating "speeches and speech making through live speaking events across the world". World Speech Day was launched at the Athens Democracy Forum in 2015; the first World Speech Day took place on 15 March 2016, with memorable events in Athens, Singapore, Tawau and Moscow.

At World Speech Day 2017, there were in events in some 80 nations. These ranged from the Parliament Hall in Ulaan Baatar to a school classroom in Palestine, from the Ismaili Centre in Bangladesh to the Oxford Union at Oxford University, from lecture theatres in Ibadan and Lagos to high schools and colleges across the USA.

Many events are broadcast on livestream TV, via WSD TV.

Anyone can make a speech on World Speech Day and anyone can host an event, by joining as a WSD member on its site.

The theme for World Speech Day is “Thoughts for a Better World”: speeches can change the world. Those changes can be in the life of an individual; or local, in the life of a village or community or school or social group; or they can be more ambitious, touching the life of a nation.
