= Feast of the Annunciation =

Celebration commemorating the visit of the archangel Gabriel to the Virgin Mary

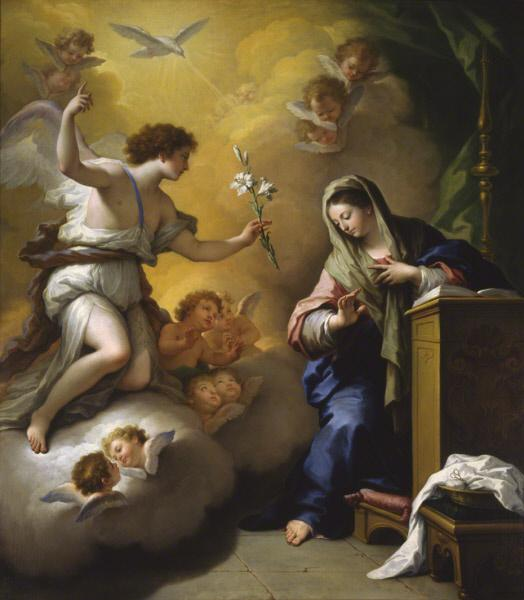
- The Annunciation by Paolo de Matteis
- Also called: Annunciation Day, Lady Day, Our Lady's Day in Lent, Feast of the Incarnation, Conceptio Christi
- Observed by: Christianity
- Type: Christian
- Significance: celebrates the annunciation of Jesus's conception and incarnation
- Date: 25 March
- Frequency: annual
- Related to: Expectation of the Blessed Virgin Mary, Feast of the Visitation, Christmas, March equinox

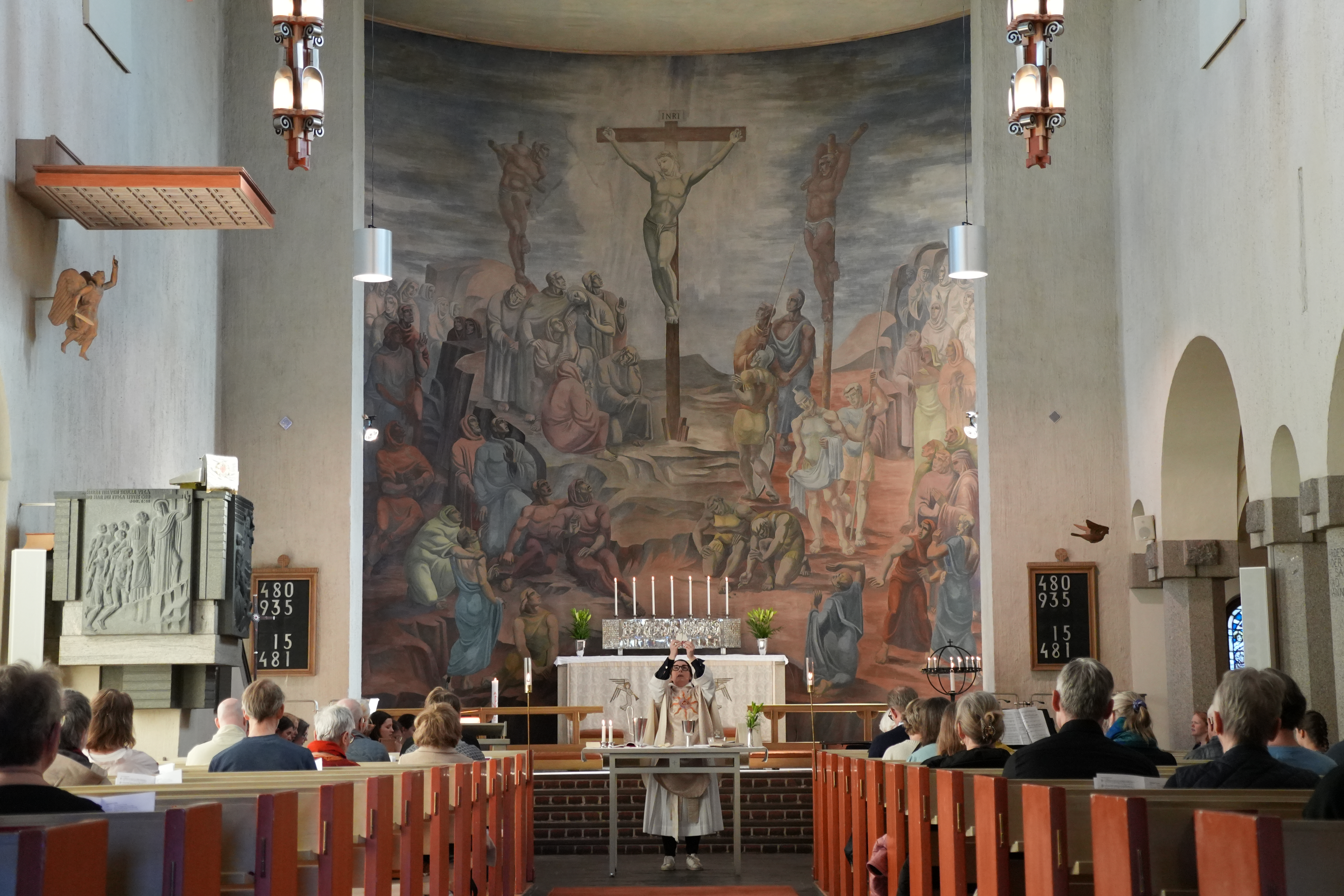
Lutheran priest elevating the host during High Mass at Västerled Church (Bromma, Sweden) on the Feast of the Annunciation, 2026

The Feast of the Annunciation or Solemnity of the Annunciation commemorates the announcement of the archangel Gabriel to Mary, that she would miraculously conceive and give birth to a son, becoming the mother of Jesus Christ, the Son of God, marking his incarnation. It is celebrated on 25 March, which is nine months before Christmas in Western Christianity and the traditional date of the spring equinox. However, if 25 March falls either in Holy Week or in Easter Week, the feast is postponed to the Monday after the Second Sunday of Easter. Other names for the feast include Annunciation Day, Lady Day, the Feast of the Incarnation, and Conceptio Christi (Christ's Conception).

The Feast of the Annunciation is observed almost universally throughout Christianity, especially within the Catholic Church, the Eastern Orthodox Church, Lutheranism, and Anglicanism. It is a major Marian feast, classified as a solemnity in the Catholic Church, a Festival in Lutheranism, and a Principal Feast in the Anglican Communion. In the Eastern Orthodox Church, because it announces the incarnation of Christ, it is counted as one of the eight great feasts of the Lord. The importance attached to the Annunciation, especially in the Catholic Church, are the Angelus and the Hail Mary prayers, the event's position as the first Joyful Mystery of the Dominican Rosary, the Novena for the Feast of the Annunciation, and the numerous depictions of the Annunciation in Christian art.

== Biblical narrative ==
The "angelic salutation" of Gabriel to Mary is recorded in the Gospel of Luke: "Hail, full of grace, the LORD is with thee" (1:28; Latin Vulgate: ave gratia plena Dominus tecum), and Mary's response to God's will; "be it done to me according to thy word" (Luke 1:38; Vulgate: fiat mihi secundum verbum tuum).

The "angelic salutation" is the origin of the Hail Mary prayer and the Angelus; the second part of the prayer comes from the salutation of Saint Elizabeth to Mary at the Visitation.

== History ==
In the words of historian Robert Bartlett, "the natural consequence of adopting a day for Jesus's birth was the ability to calculate a day for his conception nine months earlier, and so, as 25 December became generally accepted as the date of Christmas, 25 March rose into prominence too, and, just as Christmas had the added significance of being the old winter solstice, so 25 March was the old vernal equinox".

The date of 25 March was chosen due to it being nine months before 25 December, and its association with the spring equinox and the anniversary of creation. The ancient Babylonian calendar began around the spring equinox, in the month of Nissānu, at which time they celebrated the Zagmuk festival and recited their creation myth, the Enūma Eliš. Due to Babylonian influence, the beginning of the religious year in the Hebrew calendar shifted to the spring equinox and the Passover festival, with Nisan being the first month.

From the 3rd century, various Christian writers dated the anniversary of the world's creation to the spring equinox. Creation was seen as a time of perfect equilibrium, and since day and night are equal on the equinox, this was linked to the separation of light and dark in the Genesis creation story. They also dated Jesus's death or resurrection to the spring equinox, partly because it was linked to the date of Passover and partly because the spring equinox was linked with new life and increasing light.

In the Roman Julian calendar, 25 March was the date of the spring equinox. In AD 221, Sextus Julius Africanus suggested that the spring equinox on 25 March was the date of Jesus's conception, and linked it to the anniversary of the world's creation. The pseudo-Cyprianic work De Pascha Computus, c. 243, dates the first day of creation to the spring equinox on 25 March and dates Jesus's birth to 28 March, the anniversary of the sun's creation on the fourth day.

At first, the Feast of the Annunciation or Incarnation seems to have been celebrated on the Sunday before Christmas. The earliest evidence for a Feast of the Annunciation on 25 March is from the sixth century. According to a letter of the emperor Justinian I, the feast on that date originated with the church in Constantinople around AD 555. The Church in Spain "acknowledged that the Feast of the Annunciation would constantly become entangled either with Lent or with Easter", so at the Tenth Council of Toledo in 656 it ordered the feast be moved to 18 December, which became the Feast of the Expectation of Mary. The Quinisext Council, held in Constantinople in 692, allowed the Annunciation to be an exception to the rule that no feasts be held during Lent.

A Synod of Worcester, England in 1240 forbade all servile work on the feast. As this feast celebrates the Incarnation of the Second Person of the Trinity, many Church Fathers, including St. Athanasius, St. Gregory of Nyssa, and St. Augustine, have expounded on it.

In the tradition of the Western Churches (Catholic Church, Anglican, Lutheran, and Western Rite Orthodoxy), the feast is moved if necessary to prevent it from falling during Holy Week or Easter Week or on a Sunday on the liturgical calendars. To avoid a Sunday before Holy Week, the next day (26 March) would be observed instead. In years such as 2016, 2018, and 2024 when 25 March fell within Holy Week or Easter Week, the Annunciation is moved to the Monday after the Octave of Easter, i.e., the Monday after the Second Sunday of Easter.

In the tradition of the Eastern churches (Eastern Orthodox, Oriental, and Eastern Catholic), the feast of the Annunciation is never moved under any circumstance. They have special combined liturgies for those years when the Annunciation coincides with another feast. In these churches, even on Good Friday a Divine Liturgy is celebrated when it coincides with the Annunciation.

== Related celebrations ==
Medieval martyrologies assign to 25 March the creation of Adam and the crucifixion of Jesus; also, the fall of Lucifer, the passing of the Israelites through the Red Sea and the immolation of Isaac. The Medieval Golden Legend identifies 25 March as not only the date of Creation and Annunciation, but also a large number of other significant events in salvation history, including Good Friday of Christ's crucifixion and death.

Greek Independence Day is celebrated on the feast of the Annunciation.

Lebanon observes 25 March as a national holiday. In 2010, the Council of Ministers of Lebanon agreed to a proposal by Prime Minister Saad Hariri to proclaim the day in the interest of interfaith dialogue, as the Annunciation is described in both Christian and the Islamic texts. President Michel Suleiman described the holiday as a "Common Religious National Day" in a speech before the United Nations General Assembly.

The date is close to the vernal equinox, as Christmas is to the winter solstice; because of this the Annunciation and Christmas were two of the four "quarter days" in medieval and early modern England, which marked the divisions of the fiscal year (the other two were Midsummer Day, or the Nativity of St. John the Baptist, on 24 June, and Michaelmas, the feast day of St. Michael, on 29 September). The calculation hypothesis relies on the date for the Feast of the Annunciation on 25 March to date the Feast of the Nativity of Jesus (Christmas) on 25 December, as Mary carried Jesus in the womb for nine months.

When the calendar system of Anno Domini was first introduced by Dionysius Exiguus in AD 525, he assigned the beginning of the new year to 25 March, because according to Christian doctrine, the age of grace began with the Incarnation of Christ at the Annunciation, on which date Jesus Christ is believed to have been conceived in the Virgin Mary by the Holy Spirit.

Pope John Paul II established 25 March as the International Day of the Unborn Child, for its commemoration of the conception of Jesus.
